= List of psychiatric medications =

This is an alphabetical list of psychiatric medications used by psychiatrists and other physicians to treat mental illness or distress.

- The list is not exhaustive.
- All mentioned drugs here are generic names.
- Not all drugs listed are used regularly in all countries.

== A ==
Acamprosate, Alprazolam, Agomelatine Alpidem, Amisulpride, Amitriptyline, Amoxapine, Amphetamine, Adderall, Auvelity, Aripiprazole, Atomoxetine, Azacyclonol, Aztarys

== B ==
Benperidol, Biperiden, Bromazepam, Bupropion, Buprenorphine/naloxone, Buspirone

== C ==
Calcium carbimide, Carbamazepine, Centanafadine, Chloral hydrate, Chlordiazepoxide, Clomethiazole, Clobazam Clorgiline, Chlorpromazine, Citalopram, Clomipramine, Clonazepam, Clonidine, Clorazepate, Clozapine

== D ==
Daridorexant, Desvenlafaxine, Dextroamphetamine, Dexmethylphenidate, Dexmedetomidine

Diazepam, Disulfiram, Divaplon, Doxepin, Duloxetine

== E ==
Escitalopram, Eszopiclone, Ethyl loflazepate, Esketamine, Estazolam

== F ==
Fasiplon, Fluoxetine, Fluphenazine, Flurazepam, Fluvoxamine

== G ==
Gabapentin, Guanfacine

== H ==
Haloperidol

== K ==
Ketamine, Ketazolam

== I ==
Imipramine, Indalpine, Indiplon, Isocarboxazid, Itopride

== L ==
Lamotrigine, Lemborexant, Levoamphetamine, Levomepromazine, Lisdexamfetamine, Lithium, Loprazolam, Lorazepam, Lorediplon, Lormetazepam, Loxapine, Lumateperone, Lurasidone

== M ==
Maprotiline, Melperone, Meprobamate, Mesoridazine, Methamphetamine, Methaqualone, Methylphenidate, Mianserin, Midazolam ,Milnacipran, Mirtazapine, Mixed Amphetamine Salts, Moclobemide, Modafinil

== N ==
Nalmefene, Naltrexone, Necopidem, Nefazodone, Nitrazepam, Nortriptyline

== O ==
Ocinaplon, Olanzapine, Opipramol, Oxazepam, Oxcarbazepine

== P ==
Pagoclone, Paliperidone, Panadiplon, Pargyline, Paroxetine, Pazinaclone, Penfluridol Perphenazine, Phenelzine, Phenytoin, Pipamperone, Pimavanserin, Pimozide, Pipotiazine, Pramipexole, Pregabalin, Primidone, Prochlorperazine, Procyclidine, Promethazine, Propranolol, Prothipendyl, Protriptyline

== Q ==
Quetiapine, Quazepam

== R ==
Ramelteon, Reboxetine, Risperidone, Ropinirole, Rozerem, Rubidium chloride

== S ==
Saripidem, Scopolamine, Secobarbital, Selegiline, Serdexmethylphenidate Sertraline, Sodium thiopental, Sulfonmethane, Sulpiride, Suriclone, Suvorexant

== T ==
Taniplon,Tianeptine Temazepam, Thioridazine, Thiothixene, Topiramate, Tranylcypromine, Trazodone, Triazolam, Trifluoperazine, Trihexyphenidyl, Trimipramine

== V ==
Valbenazine, Valproate, Venlafaxine, Vilazodone, Viloxazine, Vortioxetine, Varenicline

== X ==
Xanomeline/trospium chloride

== Z ==
Zaleplon, Zimelidine, Ziprasidone, Zolpidem, Zopiclone, Zotepine, Zuclopenthixol

== See also ==
- List of psychiatric drugs by type
- List of psychiatric drugs by condition treated
- List of psychotropic medications
