= SL651498 =

Chemical compound

Identifiers
- IUPAC name: 6-fluoro-9-methyl-2-phenyl-4-(pyrrolidin-1-yl-carbonyl)-2,9-dihydro-1H-pyrido[3,4-b]indol-1-one
- CAS Number: 205881-86-3
- ChemSpider: 8084030
- UNII: 082VH54RF1
- CompTox Dashboard (EPA): DTXSID401045803

Chemical and physical data
- Formula: C_{23}H_{20}FN_{3}O_{2}
- Molar mass: 389.430 g·mol^{−1}
- 3D model (JSmol): Interactive image
- SMILES: O=C1N(C2=CC=CC=C2)C=C(C(N3CCCC3)=O)C4=C1N(C)C5=C4C=C(F)C=C5
- InChI: InChI=1S/C23H20FN3O2/c1-25-19-10-9-15(24)13-17(19)20-18(22(28)26-11-5-6-12-26)14-27(23(29)21(20)25)16-7-3-2-4-8-16/h2-4,7-10,13-14H,5-6,11-12H2,1H3; Key:QQWHWWDIFGNCLV-UHFFFAOYSA-N

SL651498 is an anxiolytic and anticonvulsant drug used in scientific research, with a chemical structure most closely related to β-carboline derivatives such as abecarnil and gedocarnil. It has similar effects to benzodiazepine drugs, but is structurally distinct and so is classed as a nonbenzodiazepine anxiolytic.

SL651498 is a subtype-selective GABA_{A} agonist, which acts as a full agonist at α_{2} and α_{3} subtypes, and as a partial agonist at α_{1} and α_{5} (although its action at α_{5} subtypes is much weaker than at the others). In animal studies, it has primarily anxiolytic effects, although some sedation, ataxia and muscle relaxant effects are observed at higher doses. It substitutes fully for the anxiolytic benzodiazepine chlordiazepoxide, but only partially substituted for the imidazopyridine hypnotic drug zolpidem and the benzodiazepine hypnotic triazolam. When given repeatedly it failed to produce tolerance or dependence, probably due to its low affinity and efficacy at the α_{5} subtype.

SL651498 has been suggested for development as a novel non-sedating anxiolytic drug for humans, although it is still only at an early stage of research. Preliminary human trials suggest similar efficacy to lorazepam as an anxiolytic, but with little or no sedation or impairment of memory, motor skills or cognitive function.

There are other possibly anxioselective compounds in development, such as L-838,417, NGD 91-3.

== See also ==
- Substituted β-carboline
- Fenharmane
