= TP-003 =

Chemical compound

Identifiers
- IUPAC name: 5-fluoro-2-[4-fluoro-3-[8-fluoro-7-(2-hydroxypropan-2-yl)imidazo[1,2-a]pyridin-3-yl]phenyl]benzonitrile
- CAS Number: 628690-75-5
- PubChem CID: 9978724
- ChemSpider: 8154316
- CompTox Dashboard (EPA): DTXSID101108234

Chemical and physical data
- Formula: C_{23}H_{16}F_{3}N_{3}O
- Molar mass: 407.396 g·mol^{−1}
- 3D model (JSmol): Interactive image
- SMILES: N#Cc4cc(F)ccc4-c1cc(ccc1F)-c2cnc3n2ccc(C(C)(O)C)c3F
- InChI: InChI=1S/C23H16F3N3O/c1-23(2,30)18-7-8-29-20(12-28-22(29)21(18)26)17-10-13(3-6-19(17)25)16-5-4-15(24)9-14(16)11-27/h3-10,12,30H,1-2H3; Key:VLFITPUZJCLTFQ-UHFFFAOYSA-N

TP-003 is an anxiolytic drug with a novel chemical structure, which is used in scientific research. It has similar effects to benzodiazepine drugs, but is structurally distinct and so is classed as a nonbenzodiazepine anxiolytic.

TP-003 is a positive allosteric modulator at the benzodiazepine binding site of GABA_{A} receptors. It possesses relative selectivity for benzodiazepine sites on α3-containing GABA_{A} receptors, which are thought to contribute to the anxiolytic effects of benzodiazepines (in tandem with those containing α2 subunits). It has modest anticonvulsant activity although less than that of diazepam.

== See also ==
- Imidazopyridine
- L-838,417
- Alpidem
