= TCS-1205 =

Names
- IUPAC name 2-(5-Nitro-1H-indol-3-yl)-2-oxo-N-[(1R)-1-phenylethyl]acetamide

Identifiers
CAS Number	355022-97-8
3D model (JSmol)	Interactive image
ChEMBL	ChEMBL75456
ChemSpider	8490466
PubChem CID	10315001
- InChI: Key: VCKKJKQZHHPPDR-LLVKDONJSA-N; InChI=1S/C18H15N3O4/c1-11(12-5-3-2-4-6-12)20-18(23)17(22)15-10-19-16-8-7-13(21(24)25)9-14(15)16/h2-11,19H,1H3,(H,20,23)/t11-/m1/s1
- SMILES: CC(C1=CC=CC=C1)NC(=O)C(=O)C2=CNC3=C2C=C(C=C3)[N+](=O)[O-]

Properties
Chemical formula	C_{18}H_{15}N_{3}O_{4}
Molar mass	337.335 g·mol^{−1}
- Except where otherwise noted, data are given for materials in their standard state (at 25 °C [77 °F], 100 kPa). Infobox references

TCS 1205 is a GABA_{A} receptor positive allosteric modulator of the tryptamine family. It is a benzodiazepine site agonist selective for certain subunits.

== Pharmacology ==
TCS 1205 acts at the benzodiazepine binding site, it is selective for the α1 and α2 subunits of the GABA_{A} receptor. In vivo, it has anxiolytic effects but no sedative effects.

== Chemistry ==
Despite acting at the benzodiazepine receptor, it does not contain the benzodiazepine structure, it could therefore be classed as a nonbenzodiazepine. The drug is a substituted tryptamine derivative.
