= C18H19N3O2 =

The molecular formula C_{18}H_{19}N_{3}O_{2} (molar mass: 309.36 g/mol, exact mass: 309.1477 u) may refer to:

- CGS-20625
- Irampanel
- Nerisopam
