= KRM-II-81 =

Novel anticonvulsant and anxiolytic

Names
- IUPAC name 5-(8-Ethynyl-6-pyridin-2-yl-4H-imidazo[1,5-a][1,4]benzodiazepin-3-yl)-1,3-oxazole

Identifiers
3D model (JSmol)	Interactive image
ChEMBL	ChEMBL4062225
ChemSpider	76742771
PubChem CID	122582003
- InChI: InChI=1S/C21H13N5O/c1-2-14-6-7-17-15(9-14)20(16-5-3-4-8-23-16)24-10-18-21(25-12-26(17)18)19-11-22-13-27-19/h1,3-9,11-13H,10H2 Key: KNCUEWYWBUIFTQ-UHFFFAOYSA-N
- SMILES: C#CC1=CC2=C(C=C1)N3C=NC(=C3CN=C2C4=CC=CC=N4)C5=CN=CO5

Properties
Chemical formula	C_{21}H_{13}N_{5}O
Molar mass	351.369 g·mol^{−1}
- Except where otherwise noted, data are given for materials in their standard state (at 25 °C [77 °F], 100 kPa). Infobox references

KRM-II-81 is a positive allosteric modulator of the GABA_{A} receptor. It is selective for the alpha2 and alpha3 subunits. KRM-II-81 displays anxiolytic, antidepressant and anticonvulsant effects. However, it has less adverse effects than some other GABA_{A} PAMs: it has low to no sedation and no tolerance development.

A study has also shown KRM-II-81 to be better at treating seizures than diazepam.
