= C17H17N3O2 =

The molecular formula C_{17}H_{17}N_{3}O_{2} (molar mass: 295.336 g/mol, exact mass: 295.1321 u) may refer to:

- Divaplon (RU-32698)
- GYKI-52895
