= C10H12N2O3S =

The molecular formula C_{10}H_{12}N_{2}O_{3}S (molar mass: 240.28 g/mol) may refer to:

- Bentazon
- HIE-124
