= C14H16ClN3O =

The molecular formula C_{14}H_{16}ClN_{3}O may refer to:

- ELB-139, an anxiolytic drug with a novel chemical structure, which is used in scientific research
- JNJ-7777120, a drug being developed by Johnson & Johnson Pharmaceutical Research & Development
