= C21H19F2N3O3 =

The molecular formula C_{21}H_{19}F_{2}N_{3}O_{3} (molar mass: 399.39 g/mol) may refer to:

- Difloxacin
- RWJ-51204
