= JM-1232 =

Chemical compound

Identifiers
- IUPAC name: (3R)-3-[2-(4-methylpiperazin-1-yl)-2-oxoethyl]-2-phenyl-3,5,6,7-tetrahydrocyclopenta[f]isoindol-1-one
- CAS Number: 1013427-48-9
- PubChem CID: 17755150
- ChemSpider: 26231036
- UNII: MD92F5Z441
- CompTox Dashboard (EPA): DTXSID201029752

Chemical and physical data
- Formula: C_{24}H_{27}N_{3}O_{2}
- Molar mass: 389.499 g·mol^{−1}
- 3D model (JSmol): Interactive image
- SMILES: O=C1C2=CC3=C(C=C2[C@H](N1C4=CC=CC=C4)CC(N5CCN(CC5)C)=O)CCC3
- InChI: InChI=1S/C24H27N3O2/c1-25-10-12-26(13-11-25)23(28)16-22-20-14-17-6-5-7-18(17)15-21(20)24(29)27(22)19-8-3-2-4-9-19/h2-4,8-9,14-15,22H,5-7,10-13,16H2,1H3/t22-/m1/s1; Key:MBGOHVUPIPFVMM-JOCHJYFZSA-N

JM-1232 (MR04A3) is a sedative and hypnotic drug being researched as a potential anesthetic. It has similar effects to sedative-hypnotic benzodiazepine drugs, but is structurally distinct and so is classed as a nonbenzodiazepine hypnotic. It was developed by a team at Maruishi Pharmaceutica.

A human study explored the sedation caused by infusions at a range of doses, finding a fair hemodynamic safety profile.
