= Alpidem =

Anxiolytic medication

Clinical data
- Trade names: Ananxyl
- Other names: SL 80.0342; SL800342; SL-800342
- Routes of administration: Oral administration
- Drug class: Nonbenzodiazepine; GABA_{A} receptor positive allosteric modulator; Anxiolytic
- ATC code: None

Legal status
- Legal status: In general: ℞ (Prescription only)

Pharmacokinetic data
- Bioavailability: 32–35% (estimated)
- Protein binding: 99.4%
- Metabolism: Extensive (hydroxylation, dealkylation, conjugation)
- Metabolites: Many (some active)
- Onset of action: 1.0–2.5 hours (C_{max})
- Elimination half-life: Young adults: 19 hours (7–44 hours); Elderly: 22.6 ± 2.3 hours Children: 11.4 ± 1.9 hours
- Excretion: Mainly feces

Identifiers
- IUPAC name: 2-[6-chloro-2-(4-chlorophenyl)imidazo[1,2-a]pyridin-3-yl]-N,N-dipropylacetamide
- CAS Number: 82626-01-5
- PubChem CID: 54897
- ChemSpider: 49570
- UNII: I93SC245QZ
- KEGG: D02833
- ChEBI: CHEBI:135649
- ChEMBL: ChEMBL54349
- CompTox Dashboard (EPA): DTXSID8049046
- ECHA InfoCard: 100.216.305

Chemical and physical data
- Formula: C_{21}H_{23}Cl_{2}N_{3}O
- Molar mass: 404.34 g·mol^{−1}
- 3D model (JSmol): Interactive image
- SMILES: CCCN(CCC)C(=O)CC1=C(N=C2N1C=C(C=C2)Cl)C3=CC=C(C=C3)Cl
- InChI: InChI=1S/C21H23Cl2N3O/c1-3-11-25(12-4-2)20(27)13-18-21(15-5-7-16(22)8-6-15)24-19-10-9-17(23)14-26(18)19/h5-10,14H,3-4,11-13H2,1-2H3; Key:JRTIDHTUMYMPRU-UHFFFAOYSA-N

Alpidem, sold under the brand name Ananxyl, is a nonbenzodiazepine anxiolytic medication which was briefly used to treat anxiety disorders but is no longer marketed. It was previously marketed in France, but was discontinued due to liver toxicity. Alpidem is taken by mouth.

Side effects of alpidem include sedation, fatigue, dizziness, and headache, among others. It has much less to no impact on cognition, memory, and psychomotor function relative to benzodiazepines. Similarly, no rebound anxiety or withdrawal symptoms have been observed with alpidem. Rarely, alpidem can cause serious liver toxicity, including liver failure and death. Alpidem is a nonbenzodiazepine of the imidazopyridine family, structurally related to the Z-drug zolpidem, and acts as a GABA_{A} receptor positive allosteric modulator of the benzodiazepine site of the receptor complex. In contrast to zolpidem however, alpidem has anxiolytic effects rather than sedative or hypnotic effects at normal therapeutic doses.

Alpidem was first described by 1982 and was introduced for medical use in France in 1991. It was also under development for use in other countries in the 1990s, but development was discontinued and the drug was never marketed in any other country. Alpidem was withdrawn from the market in France in 1993 due to liver toxicity.

== Medical uses ==
Alpidem was approved for the treatment of generalized anxiety disorder and possibly also other anxiety problems. By 1990, 17 clinical studies including more than 1,500 patients had been conducted in Europe studying alpidem for the treatment of anxiety. In clinical trials, alpidem demonstrated effectiveness in the treatment of chronic and situational anxiety, including stress-related anxiety, generalized anxiety, and adjustment disorder (situational depression) with anxiety. It also showed preliminary effectiveness in institutionalized individuals with chronic psychosis and high anxiety levels. The effectiveness of alpidem for panic disorder, on the other hand, is understudied and uncertain.

The anxiolytic effects of alpidem are described as rapid, robust, and maintained in the long-term. For situational anxiety, the anxiolytic effects of alpidem onset within 1.5 to 2 hours, whereas for chronic anxiety disorders the effects onset within 3 to 5 days in most cases. No indications of tolerance to its anxiolytic effects or need for dose increases have been observed. In people with anxiety taking alpidem, improvement in mood and sleep have also been found.

The anxiolytic effectiveness of alpidem, for example measured by reductions on the Hamilton Anxiety Rating Scale (HAM-A), was superior to placebo and comparable or equivalent to that of benzodiazepines including diazepam (10–15 mg/day), lorazepam (1–6 mg/day), and clorazepate (30 mg/day) in directly comparative randomized controlled trials. Alpidem has also been directly compared with buspirone (20–30 mg/day) for generalized anxiety disorder. Relative to buspirone, it was found to produce more rapid improvement, to have significantly greater effectiveness, and to have fewer side effects and a lower discontinuation rate.

The recommended dose of alpidem was 75 to 150 mg total per day, given in single doses of 25 to 75 mg two to three times per day.

=== Available forms ===
Alpidem was provided in the form of 50-mg oral tablets.

== Side effects ==
Alpidem is described as well-tolerated. Side effects include sedation (6–8%; dose-dependent), fatigue (3–4%), dizziness (3–4%), and headache (2–3%), among others. It is reported to have minimal sedative effects and to have virtually no negative effects on cognition, memory, and psychomotor function at therapeutic doses. However, some impairment of vigilance and psychomotor function has been reported at high doses (100–200 mg). In addition, driving ability has been studied with alpidem and has been found to be impaired. The central side effects of alpidem were found to be no worse in elderly people than in young adults.

Alpidem does not alter sleep architecture as measured by electroencephalography. In laboratory tests, 0.9% of patients treated with alpidem showed alterations. No adverse effects on cardiovascular or respiratory function were seen in clinical trials.

No rebound anxiety or withdrawal symptoms have been observed with alpidem after abrupt discontinuation following 4 weeks to 6–12 months of treatment. Conversely, substantial withdrawal symptoms, including rebound anxiety, were observed with lorazepam.

The side effects of alpidem are described as quite different from those of benzodiazepines. In directly comparative trials, alpidem produced similar anxiolytic effects with less fatigue, asthenia, depressive mood, and psychomotor impairment than benzodiazepines, while rates of somnolence and drowsiness were comparable to benzodiazepines but described as milder in severity. Whereas benzodiazepines commonly produce dizziness, muscle weakness, fatigue, and sleepiness as side effects, these are not prominent adverse effects with doses of alpidem that have similar anxiolytic effectiveness. The lack of withdrawal or rebound symptoms with alpidem upon discontinuation is also in contrast to benzodiazepines. In addition, alpidem significantly antagonized the amnestic effects of lorazepam and showed similar trends for other cognitive measures in a clinical study in which the two drugs were combined and assessed for interaction.

Following marketing authorization in France, several cases of severe liver toxicity were reported in people taking alpidem. This resulted in one death and several cases of liver transplantation. As a result, alpidem was soon withdrawn from the market. The liver toxicity of alpidem was subsequently characterized in preclinical research. It may be related to interactions of alpidem with the translocator protein (TSPO), which is present in high amounts in the liver and which may mediate toxic effects in this tissue.

== Overdose ==
Little information is available on overdose with alpidem. Doses of as high as 300 mg/day, which is 2 to 4 times the recommended total daily dose, were assessed in clinical trials.

== Interactions ==
Alpidem may interact with alcohol, but to a lesser extent than benzodiazepines.

== Pharmacology ==
=== Pharmacodynamics ===
Alpidem is a GABA_{A} receptor positive allosteric modulator (GABAkine), specifically acting as an agonist of the benzodiazepine site of the receptor complex (formerly known as the central benzodiazepine receptor (CBR)). In addition to its affinity for the benzodiazepine site of the GABA_{A} receptor (K_{i} = 1–28 nM), alpidem has similarly high affinity for the translocator protein (TSPO) (formerly the peripheral benzodiazepine receptor (PBR)) (K_{i} = 0.5–7 nM). Alpidem shows more than 500-fold selectivity for α_{1} subunit-containing GABA_{A} receptors over α_{5} subunit-containing GABA_{A} receptors and 80-fold selectivity for α_{1} subunit-containing GABA_{A} receptors over α_{3} subunit-containing GABA_{A} receptors. However, alpidem has also been described as potently modulating α_{1}, α_{2}, and α_{3} subunit-containing GABA_{A} receptors with no effect on α_{5} subunit-containing GABA_{A} receptors. Findings appear to be mixed on whether alpidem is a partial agonist or a full agonist of the benzodiazepine site of the GABA_{A} receptor. In animals, alpidem has anxiolytic-like effects in some but not all models, weak anticonvulsant effects, and weak or no sedative, amnesic, ataxic, or muscle relaxant effects. High doses of alpidem antagonize the sedative and muscle relaxant effects of diazepam in animals. Flumazenil has been shown to antagonize the anxiolytic and anticonvulsant effects of alpidem in animals. Besides acting directly via the GABA_{A} receptor, interactions with the TSPO might also contribute to the anxiolytic effects of alpidem. This protein mediates promotion of neurosteroidogenesis in the brain, for instance of allopregnanolone.

Alpidem is structurally related to zolpidem, and both alpidem and zolpidem are GABA_{A} receptor positive allosteric modulators of the benzodiazepine site with preference for α_{1} subunit-containing receptors. Both alpidem and zolpidem have very low affinity for α_{5} subunit-containing GABA_{A} receptors, in contrast to benzodiazepines. Similarly, both alpidem and zolpidem are selective for γ_{2} subunit-containing GABA_{A} receptors, with very low affinity for γ_{1} and γ_{3} subunit-containing GABA_{A} receptors, in contrast to other Z-drugs and to diazepam. Alpidem has very high affinity for the TSPO, while zolpidem has very low affinity for this protein. The affinity of alpidem for the TSPO (also previously known as the ω_{3} receptor) was once the highest of any drug known. Although benzodiazepines like diazepam are also known to bind to the TSPO, the affinity of alpidem for this protein is at least 3,000-fold higher in comparison. Whereas zolpidem shows hypnotic and sedative effects and is used to treat insomnia, alpidem shows mainly anxiolytic effects and is used to treat anxiety disorders. Alpidem was developed before the widespread use of recombinant GABA_{A} receptors. Hence, its pharmacological profile at the GABA_{A} receptors, including its profile at different subpopulations of these receptors, has never been fully characterized.

The pharmacodynamic mechanisms underlying the anxioselective (anxiolytic-selective) profile of alpidem as a GABA_{A} receptor positive allosteric modulator are unclear. In any case, subtype selectivity for different populations of GABA_{A} receptors, partial agonism of the benzodiazepine site of the GABA_{A} receptor, and/or interactions with the TSPO may potentially all be involved. Although anxioselective profiles have been observed for many GABA_{A} receptor positive allosteric modulators in preclinical research, alpidem is the only GABA_{A} receptor positive allosteric modulator for which anxioselective effects have been unambiguously demonstrated in human clinical trials. Ocinaplon has also shown preliminary signs of an anxioselective profile in clinical studies, but development of this agent was discontinued in late-stage trials due to findings of elevated liver enzymes in a small subset of patients. GABA_{A} receptor positive allosteric modulators with selectivity for α_{2} and α_{3} subunit-containing GABA_{A} receptors over α_{1} subunit-containing GABA_{A} receptors, for instance adipiplon, L-838,417, and darigabat—among others, have been and are under investigation as potential anxioselective agents. However, no such drugs have yet completed clinical development or been marketed for medical use. Despite many developmental failures, alpidem serves as a potential proof of concept that anxioselective GABA_{A} receptor positive allosteric modulators may be possible. However, if interactions with the TSPO are key to the anxiolytic effects of alpidem, then this may not actually be the case.

=== Pharmacokinetics ===
==== Absorption ====
Alpidem is taken via oral administration. The absorption of alpidem is rapid and it reaches peak levels after 1.0 to 2.5 hours. Its overall bioavailability is estimated to be approximately 32 to 35%, but no precise value for absolute bioavailability has been determined. Absorption of alpidem as indicated by peak and area-under-the-curve levels is linear across a dose range of 25 to 100 mg. Food increases the bioavailability of alpidem by 15 to 20%.

==== Distribution ====
Alpidem is a highly lipophilic compound and in animals is extensively distributed into lipid-rich tissues. Similarly, alpidem has been shown to cross the blood–brain barrier in animals, and showed a brain/plasma ratio of about 2.0 to 2.5 following systemic administration. This is related to significantly slower efflux of alpidem from the brain than entry. The active metabolites of alpidem are also brain-penetrant, although occur in the brain at levels lower than those of alpidem. Alpidem may be concentrated more in lipid-rich white matter brain structures than grey matter structures. In humans, the volume of distribution of alpidem is large at 8.7 L•kg^{−1}. The plasma protein binding of alpidem is 99.4%, with similar isolated fractions bound to albumin (97.0%) and α_{1}-acid glycoprotein (97.3%). The free fraction of alpidem is slightly higher in people with cirrhosis (0.86 ± 0.06%) and renal failure (0.72 ± 0.03%) relative to normal individuals (0.61 ± 0.05%).

==== Metabolism ====
Alpidem is extensively metabolized, including by hydroxylation, dealkylation, and conjugation. Many metabolites of alpidem have been identified, and some of these metabolites may contribute to its pharmacological activity.

==== Elimination ====
Alpidem is eliminated mainly in feces, with less than 0.1% excreted in urine. A majority of alpidem is eliminated within 48 to 72 hours following oral dosing. Only trace amounts of unchanged alpidem are found in feces and urine. The metabolites of alpidem are excreted mainly in via the bile in feces, with less than 5% eliminated via urine.

The elimination half-life of alpidem was mean 18.8 ± 0.8 hours (range 7 to 44 hours) following a single 50-mg oral dose given to young individuals. In elderly individuals, a trend toward a longer half-life was observed (22.6 ± 2.3 hours). Conversely, in children age 8 to 12 years, the half-life of alpidem was considerably reduced (11.4 ± 1.9 hours). The half-lives of alpidem and its metabolites are significantly prolonged in people with hepatic impairment. Conversely, the half-lives of alpidem and its metabolites were unchanged in people with different stages of renal impairment, though plasma concentrations were significantly increased. The clearance of alpidem was estimated to be 0.86 ± 0.04 L•h^{−1}•kg^{−1} in healthy individuals.

== Chemistry ==
Alpidem is a nonbenzodiazepine, and hence is not structurally related to benzodiazepines. It is a member of the imidazopyridine group of compounds. Alpidem is structurally related to the Z-drug zolpidem, which is also an imidazopyridine.

== History ==
Alpidem was developed by Synthélabo Recherche (subsequently Sanofi-Synthélabo and now Sanofi-Aventis). It was developed under the code name SL 80.0342 and was first described in the literature by 1982. Alpidem was introduced for medical use in France in 1991. It was also undergoing development in the 1990s for use in other countries such as the United States and other European countries like Germany, the Netherlands, and Spain. The drug reached phase 3 clinical trials in these countries. However, development in the United States was halted in 1992 due to "divergent results". All development in other countries was discontinued by 1999. Alpidem was withdrawn from the market in France in 1993 due to liver toxicity. It was never marketed in any other country.

== Society and culture ==
=== Names ===
Alpidem is the generic name of the drug and its INN, USAN, BAN, and DCF. The developmental code name of alpidem was SL 80.0342. Alpidem was previously marketed under the brand name Ananxyl.

=== Availability ===
Alpidem was previously marketed in France, but is no longer available in any country.

== See also ==
- Etifoxine
