= NS-2710 =

Chemical compound

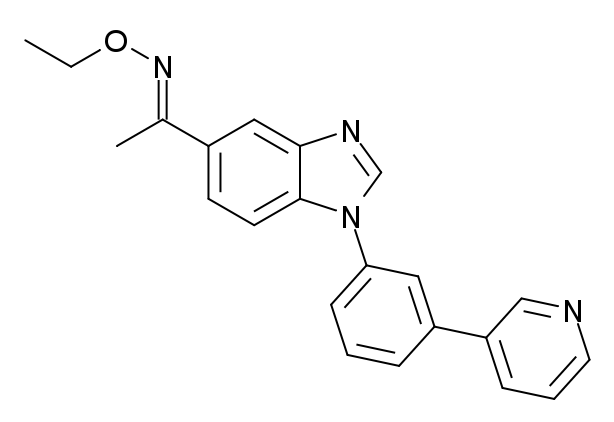

Identifiers
- IUPAC name: 1-[1-[3-(3-pyridyl)phenyl]benzimidazol-5-yl]ethanone O-ethyloxime
- CAS Number: 184220-36-8
- PubChem CID: 9863520
- ChemSpider: 8039216
- UNII: J0WHC91NJO
- ChEMBL: ChEMBL381625

Chemical and physical data
- Formula: C_{22}H_{20}N_{4}O
- Molar mass: 356.429 g·mol^{−1}
- 3D model (JSmol): Interactive image
- SMILES: c4ncccc4-c(c2)cccc2-n3c1ccc(cc1nc3)C(C)=NOCC
- InChI: InChI=1S/C22H20N4O/c1-3-27-25-16(2)17-9-10-22-21(13-17)24-15-26(22)20-8-4-6-18(12-20)19-7-5-11-23-14-19/h4-15H,3H2,1-2H3/b25-16+; Key:NHJFEXZXSCFYRX-PCLIKHOPSA-N

NS-2710 (LS-193,970) is an anxiolytic drug with a novel chemical structure, developed by the small pharmaceutical company NeuroSearch. It has similar effects to benzodiazepine drugs, but is structurally distinct and so is classed as a nonbenzodiazepine anxiolytic. NS-2710 is a potent but non-selective partial agonist at GABA_{A} receptors, although with little efficacy at the α1 subtype and more at α2 and α3. It has anxiolytic effects comparable to chlordiazepoxide, and while it is a less potent anticonvulsant than the related drug NS-2664, it has a much longer duration of action, and similarly to other α2/α3-preferring partial agonists produces little sedative effects or physical dependence.
