= U-90042 =

Chemical compound

Identifiers
- IUPAC name: 11-Chloro-5-(5-cyclopropyl-1,2,4-oxadiazol-3-yl)-2,3-dihydrodiimidazo[1,2-c:1',5'-a]quinazoline
- CAS Number: 134516-99-7
- PubChem CID: 9928470
- ChemSpider: 8104103
- CompTox Dashboard (EPA): DTXSID40158771

Chemical and physical data
- Formula: C_{17}H_{13}ClN_{6}O
- Molar mass: 352.78 g·mol^{−1}
- 3D model (JSmol): Interactive image
- SMILES: ClC1=CC2=C(C=C1)N3C=NC(C4=NOC(C5CC5)=N4)=C3N6C2=NCC6
- InChI: InChI=1S/C17H13ClN6O/c18-10-3-4-12-11(7-10)15-19-5-6-23(15)17-13(20-8-24(12)17)14-21-16(25-22-14)9-1-2-9/h3-4,7-9H,1-2,5-6H2; Key:CLPSAAPUJUVQPP-UHFFFAOYSA-N

U-90042 is a sedative and hypnotic drug used in scientific research. It has similar effects to sedative-hypnotic benzodiazepine drugs, but is structurally distinct and so is classed as a nonbenzodiazepine hypnotic.

U-90042 is a GABA_{A} agonist acting primarily at the α1, α3 and α6 subtypes, with a Ki of 7.8nM at α1, 9.5nM at α3 and 11.0nM at α6. It produces sedation and ataxia and prolongs sleeping time in mice, rats and monkeys, but does not produce amnesia and blocks the amnestic effect of diazepam, reflecting its different subtype affinity compared to benzodiazepine drugs. It was developed by a team at Novo in the 1980s.
