= TP-13 =

Chemical compound

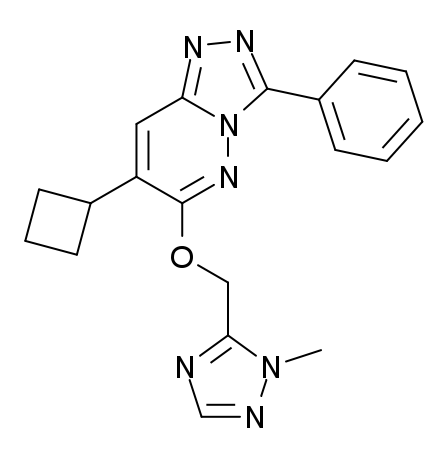

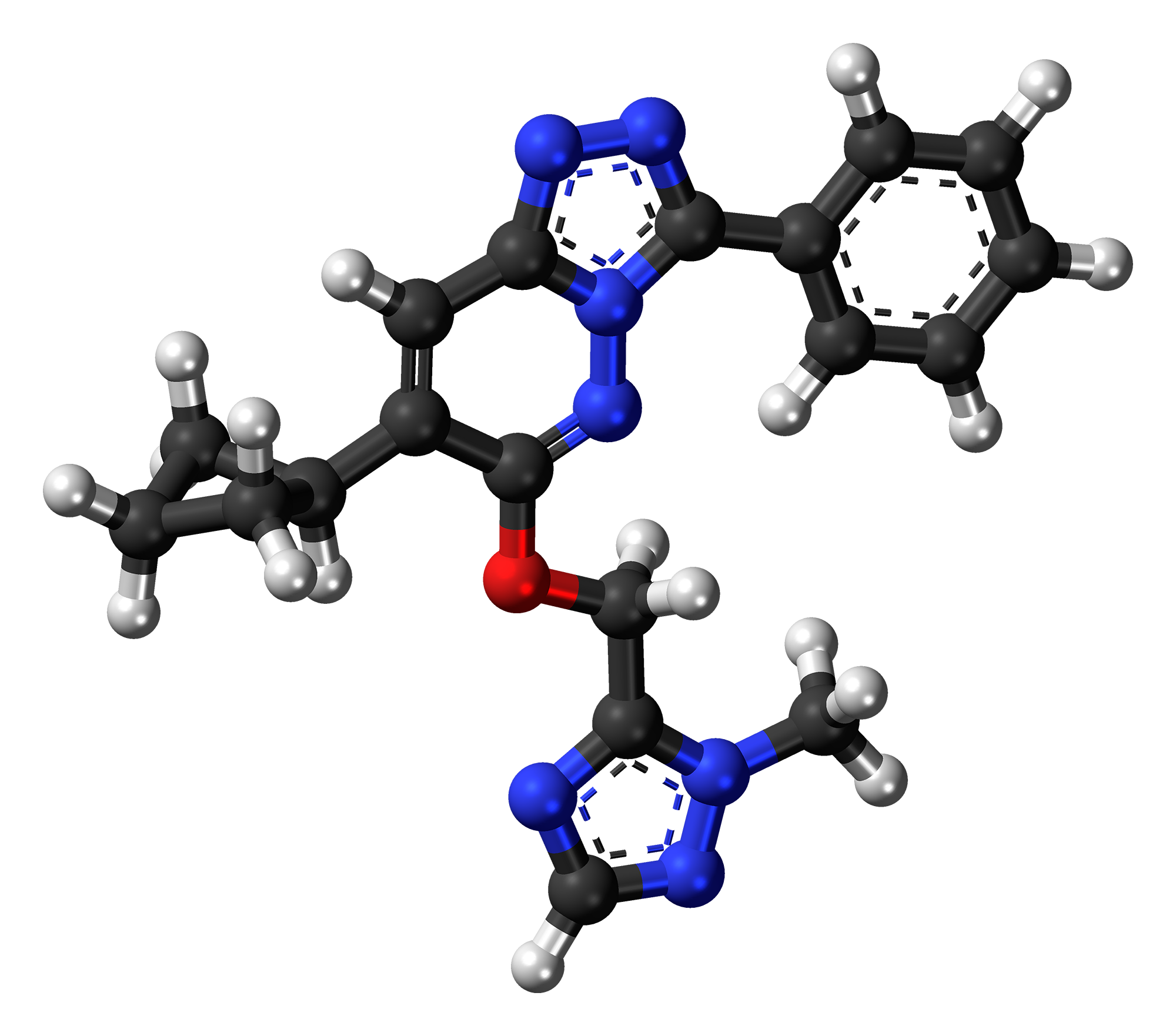

Identifiers
- IUPAC name: 7-Cyclobutyl-6-(2-ethyl-2H-1,2,4-triazol-3-ylmethoxy)-3-phenyl-1,2,4-triazolo[4,3-b] pyridazine
- CAS Number: 202930-12-9
- PubChem CID: 9799023
- ChemSpider: 7974788
- UNII: DKP4YGH6WN

Chemical and physical data
- Formula: C_{19}H_{19}N_{7}O
- Molar mass: 361.409 g·mol^{−1}
- 3D model (JSmol): Interactive image
- SMILES: C5CCC5c3cc2nnc(-c4ccccc4)n2nc3OCc1ncnn1C
- InChI: InChI=1S/C19H19N7O/c1-25-17(20-12-21-25)11-27-19-15(13-8-5-9-13)10-16-22-23-18(26(16)24-19)14-6-3-2-4-7-14/h2-4,6-7,10,12-13H,5,8-9,11H2,1H3; Key:VACJUKKURQMWHE-UHFFFAOYSA-N

TP-13 is an anxiolytic drug with a novel chemical structure, which is used in scientific research. It has similar effects to benzodiazepine drugs, but is structurally distinct and so is classed as a nonbenzodiazepine anxiolytic. It is a subtype-selective partial agonist at GABA_{A} receptors, binding selectively to GABA_{A} receptor complexes bearing α2 and α3 subunits. It has modest anticonvulsant activity although less than that of diazepam, and its main effect is likely to be selective anxiolytic action, as seen with other related α2/3-preferring agonists such as L-838,417.
