= C24H24N2O4 =

The molecular formula C_{24}H_{24}N_{2}O_{4} (molar mass: 404.45 g/mol, exact mass: 404.1736 u) may refer to:

- Abecarnil (ZK-112,119)
- Nicocodeine
