= Imidazopyridazine =

Identifiers
CAS Number	imidazo[4,5-c]pyridazine: 327-02-6; imidazo[4,5-d]pyridazine: 273-00-7; imidazo[1,2-b]pyridazine: 766-55-2
3D model (JSmol)	imidazo[4,5-c]pyridazine: Interactive image; imidazo[4,5-d]pyridazine: Interactive image; imidazo[1,2-b]pyridazine: Interactive image
ChEMBL	imidazo[4,5-d]pyridazine: ChEMBL3144350
ChemSpider	imidazo[4,5-c]pyridazine: 9204993; imidazo[4,5-d]pyridazine: 4521598; imidazo[1,2-b]pyridazine: 120366
EC Number	imidazo[1,2-b]pyridazine: 806-512-8
PubChem CID	imidazo[4,5-c]pyridazine: 11029819; imidazo[4,5-d]pyridazine: 5370875; imidazo[1,2-b]pyridazine: 136599
UNII	imidazo[1,2-b]pyridazine: HC9C5RH4HC
CompTox Dashboard (EPA)	imidazo[4,5-d]pyridazine: DTXSID40418680
- InChI: imidazo[4,5-c]pyridazine: InChI=1S/C5H4N4/c1-2-8-9-5-4(1)6-3-7-5/h1-3H,(H,6,7,9) Key: MJQSRSOTRPMVKB-UHFFFAOYSA-N; imidazo[4,5-d]pyridazine: InChI=1S/C5H4N4/c1-4-5(2-9-8-1)7-3-6-4/h1-3H,(H,6,7) Key: UWZYICUGNHLGSA-UHFFFAOYSA-N; imidazo[1,2-b]pyridazine: InChI=1S/C6H5N3/c1-2-6-7-4-5-9(6)8-3-1/h1-5H Key: VTVRXITWWZGKHV-UHFFFAOYSA-N
- SMILES: imidazo[4,5-c]pyridazine: C1=CN=NC2=C1NC=N2; imidazo[4,5-d]pyridazine: C1=C2C(=CN=N1)N=CN2; imidazo[1,2-b]pyridazine: C1=CC2=NC=CN2N=C1
- Except where otherwise noted, data are given for materials in their standard state (at 25 °C [77 °F], 100 kPa). Infobox references

Imidazopyridazine is a heterocyclic compound containing fused imidazole and pyridazine rings. The fusion of these two heterocyclic rings can yield three different isomers, namely imidazo[4,5-c]pyridazine and imidazo[4,5-d]pyridazine, both of which contain two nitrogen atoms in each ring. A third possible structure is imidazo[1,2-b]pyridazine, in which one nitrogen atom is shared between the imidazole and pyridazine rings (and hence contains one less nitrogen atom and therefore is non-isomeric).

Ponatinib, a medication used to treat chronic myeloid leukemia, contains an imidazo[1,2-b]pyridazine substructure. Examples of experimental drugs containing this ring system include darigabat (an imidazo[4,5-c]pyridazine), as well as GBLD-345 and SRI-42127 (both imidazo[1,2-b]pyridazines).
