= 2664 =

2664 may refer to:

- 2-6-6-4, a Whyte notation classification of steam locomotive
- 2664 Everhart, a minor planet
- NS-2664, an anxiolytic drug
- 2664 AD/CE in the 27th century
