= Y-23684 =

Chemical compound

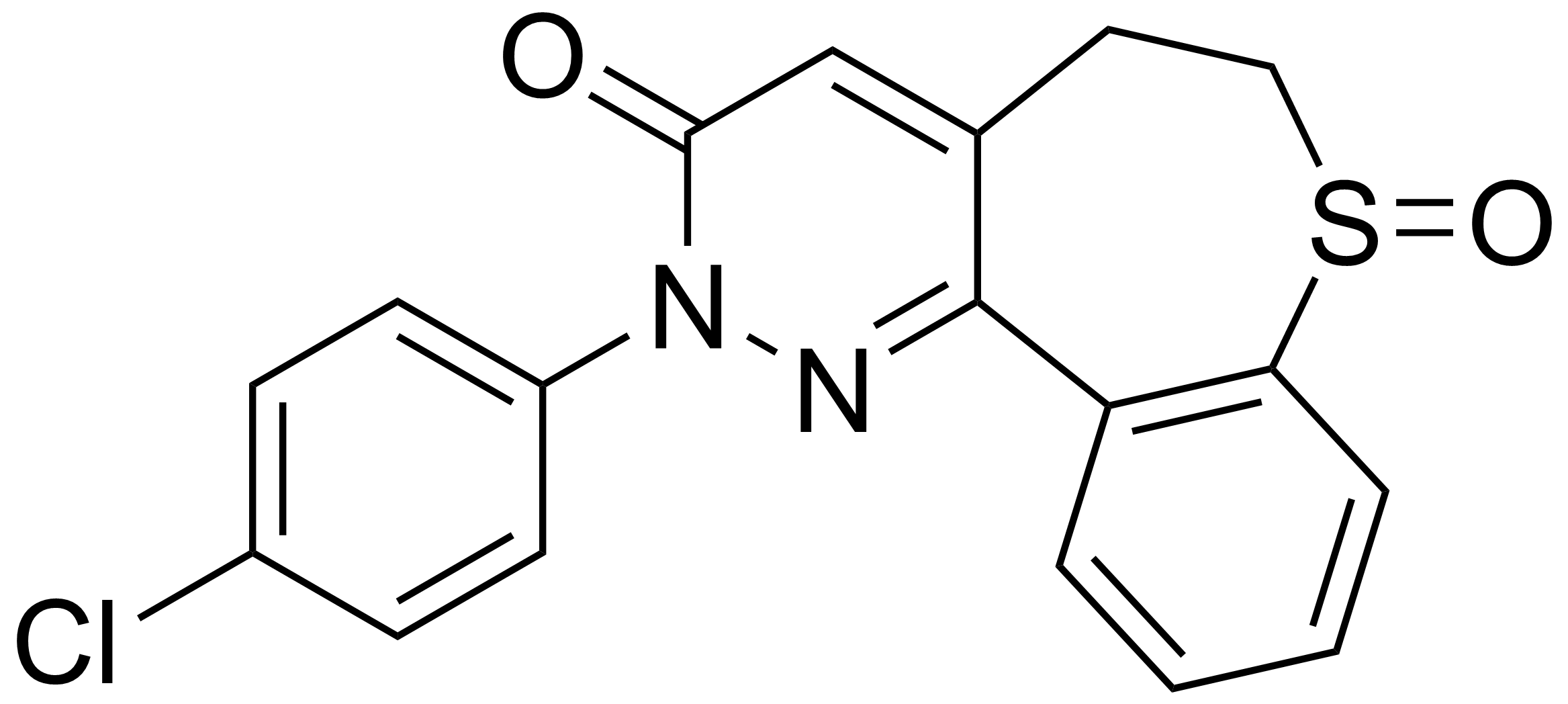

Identifiers
- IUPAC name: 2-(4-Chlorophenyl)-5,6-dihydro-[1]benzothepino[5,4-c]pyridazin-3(2H)-one-7-oxide
- CAS Number: 118288-67-8
- PubChem CID: 195253
- ChemSpider: 169332
- CompTox Dashboard (EPA): DTXSID00922652

Chemical and physical data
- Formula: C_{18}H_{13}ClN_{2}O_{2}S
- Molar mass: 356.82 g·mol^{−1}
- 3D model (JSmol): Interactive image
- SMILES: ClC1=CC=C(C=C1)N2N=C3C(CCS(C4=C3C=CC=C4)=O)=CC2=O
- InChI: InChI=1S/C18H13ClN2O2S/c19-13-5-7-14(8-6-13)21-17(22)11-12-9-10-24(23)16-4-2-1-3-15(16)18(12)20-21/h1-8,11H,9-10H2; Key:WHMCSFWQVGJBGM-UHFFFAOYSA-N

Y-23684 is an anxiolytic drug with a novel chemical structure, which is used in scientific research. It has similar effects to benzodiazepine drugs, but is structurally distinct and so is classed as a nonbenzodiazepine anxiolytic.

Y-23684 is a nonselective partial agonist at GABA_{A} receptors. It has primarily anxiolytic and anticonvulsant effects, with sedative and muscle relaxant effects only appearing at higher doses. It produces little ataxia or potentiation of other sedatives such as ethanol or barbiturates when compared to the benzodiazepines diazepam and clobazam in animal tests.

Y-23684 has a favourable pharmacological profile, producing strong anxiolytic and moderate anticonvulsant effects at low doses that cause little or no sedative side effects. It has been proposed for development for human medical use, but has not yet gone beyond animal tests.
