= SX-3228 =

Chemical compound

Clinical data
- Other names: 5,6,7,8-tetrahydro-3-(5-methoxy-1,3,4-oxadiazol-2-yl)-6-(phenylmethyl)-1,6-naphthyridin-2(1H)-one

Identifiers
- IUPAC name: (3E)-6-benzyl-3-(5-methoxy-1,3,4-oxadiazol-2(3H)-ylidene)-5,6,7,8-tetrahydro-1,6-naphthyridin-2(3H)-one
- CAS Number: 156364-04-4
- PubChem CID: 5487538
- ChemSpider: 14241619
- UNII: A5XC39S5SP

Chemical and physical data
- Formula: C_{18}H_{18}N_{4}O_{3}
- Molar mass: 338.367 g·mol^{−1}
- 3D model (JSmol): Interactive image
- SMILES: COc1nnc(o1)C/3=C/C=4CN(Cc2ccccc2)CCC=4NC\3=O
- InChI: InChI=1S/C18H18N4O3/c1-24-18-21-20-17(25-18)14-9-13-11-22(8-7-15(13)19-16(14)23)10-12-5-3-2-4-6-12/h2-6,9H,7-8,10-11H2,1H3,(H,19,23); Key:BZLLVTYOOJNQIF-UHFFFAOYSA-N

SX-3228 is a sedative and hypnotic drug used in scientific research. It has similar effects to sedative-hypnotic benzodiazepine drugs, but is structurally distinct and so is classed as a nonbenzodiazepine hypnotic.

SX-3228 is a subtype-selective GABA_{A} positive allosteric modulator acting primarily at the α1 subtype. It thus has similar effects to other α1-selective drugs such as zolpidem and zaleplon in animal studies. It only partly substitutes for ethanol, and is a strong sedative-hypnotic with only limited anxiolytic effects which appear only at doses that also produce significant sedation.
