= SB-205384 =

Chemical compound

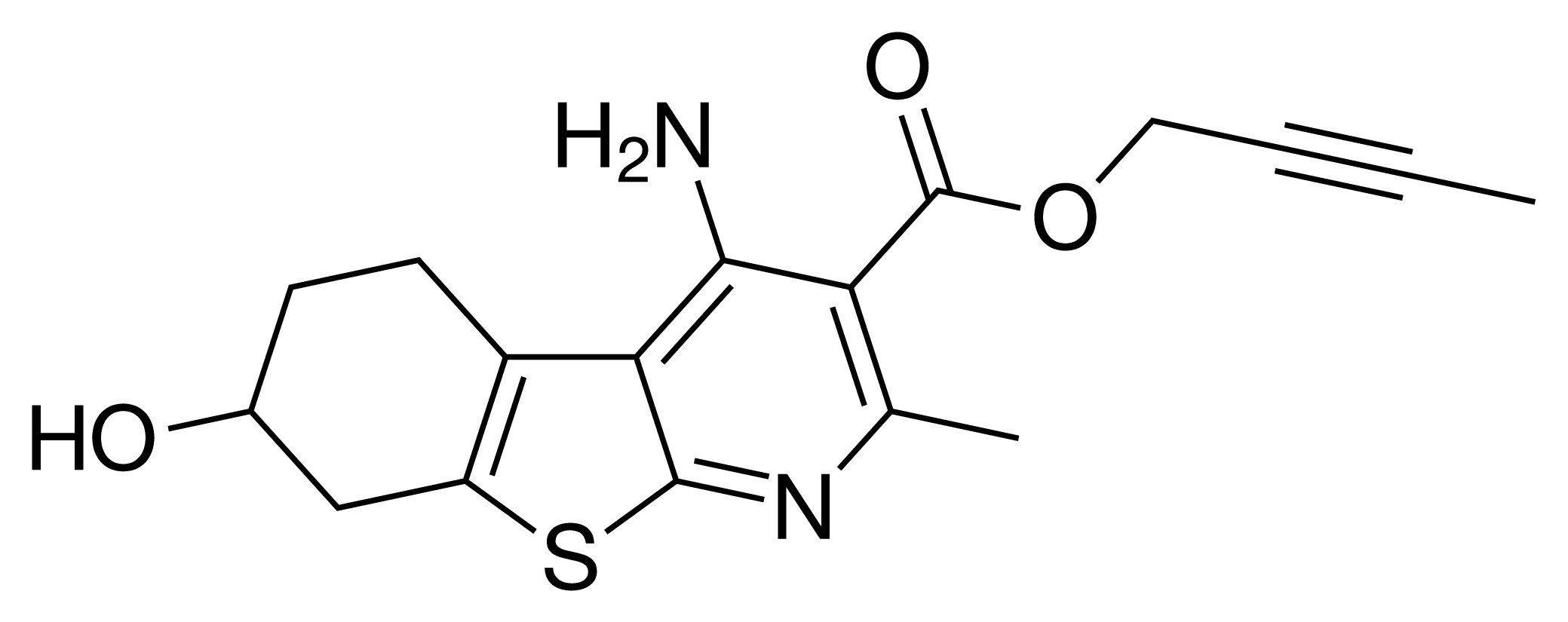

Legal status
- Legal status: US: Investigational New Drug

Identifiers
- IUPAC name: But-2-ynyl 4-amino-7-hydroxy-2-methyl-5,6,7,8-tetrahydro-[1]benzothiolo[3,2-e]pyridine-3-carboxylate
- CAS Number: 160296-13-9
- PubChem CID: 197690
- ChemSpider: 171116
- CompTox Dashboard (EPA): DTXSID00936259

Chemical and physical data
- Formula: C_{17}H_{18}N_{2}O_{3}S
- Molar mass: 330.40 g·mol^{−1}
- 3D model (JSmol): Interactive image
- SMILES: CC#CCOC(=O)c1c(C)nc2sc3CC(O)CCc3c2c1N
- InChI: InChI=1S/C17H18N2O3S/c1-3-4-7-22-17(21)13-9(2)19-16-14(15(13)18)11-6-5-10(20)8-12(11)23-16/h10,20H,5-8H2,1-2H3,(H2,18,19); Key:JDTZAGLGBRRCJT-UHFFFAOYSA-N

SB-205384 is an anxiolytic drug. It has similar effects to benzodiazepine drugs, but is structurally distinct and so is classed as a nonbenzodiazepine anxiolytic.

SB-205384 is a GABA_{A} positive allosteric modulator, which binds preferentially to α3, α5, and α6 subunit containing subtypes. It has a novel mechanism of action, prolonging the duration of GABA-mediated chloride flux but without increasing the intensity of the response, and this may give it an unusual pharmacological profile, with tests showing that it alters the firing of some populations of neurons while leaving others unaffected. Animal studies have shown it to produce both anxiolytic and anti-aggressive effects, but with little sedation or other behavioural changes.
