= Gedocarnil =

Chemical compound

Clinical data
- Other names: propan-2-yl 5-(4-chlorophenoxy)-4-(methoxymethyl)-9H-pyrido[5,4-b]indole-3-carboxylate
- ATC code: N05BX02 (WHO)

Identifiers
- IUPAC name: isopropyl 5-(4-chlorophenoxy)-4-(methoxymethyl)-9H-β-carboline-3-carboxylate
- CAS Number: 109623-97-4
- PubChem CID: 219095
- ChemSpider: 189915
- UNII: BWP53NPW3F
- KEGG: D07319
- ChEMBL: ChEMBL2105080
- CompTox Dashboard (EPA): DTXSID20148993

Chemical and physical data
- Formula: C_{23}H_{21}ClN_{2}O_{4}
- Molar mass: 424.88 g·mol^{−1}
- 3D model (JSmol): Interactive image
- SMILES: ClC1=CC=C(OC2=CC=CC3=C2C4=C(N3)C=NC(C(OC(C)C)=O)=C4COC)C=C1
- InChI: InChI=1S/C23H21ClN2O4/c1-13(2)29-23(27)22-16(12-28-3)20-18(11-25-22)26-17-5-4-6-19(21(17)20)30-15-9-7-14(24)8-10-15/h4-11,13,26H,12H2,1-3H3; Key:SLYDYLLJUXFULK-UHFFFAOYSA-N

Gedocarnil (INN) is an anxiolytic of the β-carboline family related to abecarnil. It is registered as an anxiolytic under the WHO's ATC classification system; however, there are no trade names associated with it and it does not appear to have ever been marketed.

== See also ==
- Substituted β-carboline
- Nonbenzodiazepine
