= CGS-9896 =

Anxiolytic drug used in scientific research

Clinical data
- ATC code: none

Identifiers
- IUPAC name: 2-(4-chlorophenyl)-1H-pyrazolo[4,5-c]quinolin-3-one
- CAS Number: 77779-36-3
- PubChem CID: 108030
- ChemSpider: 97139
- UNII: 86PWQ4PVN0
- ChEMBL: ChEMBL507327
- CompTox Dashboard (EPA): DTXSID20998970

Chemical and physical data
- Formula: C_{16}H_{10}ClN_{3}O
- Molar mass: 295.73 g·mol^{−1}
- 3D model (JSmol): Interactive image
- SMILES: C1=CC=C2C(=C1)C3=C(C=N2)C(=O)N(N3)C4=CC=C(C=C4)Cl
- InChI: InChI=1S/C16H10ClN3O/c17-10-5-7-11(8-6-10)20-16(21)13-9-18-14-4-2-1-3-12(14)15(13)19-20/h1-9,19H; Key:QCBUAKLOWCOUCR-UHFFFAOYSA-N

CGS-9896 is an anxiolytic drug used in scientific research. It has similar effects to benzodiazepine drugs but is structurally distinct and so is classed as a nonbenzodiazepine anxiolytic.

CGS-9896 is a benzodiazepine receptor partial agonist which produces long-lasting anxiolytic and anticonvulsant effects in animal studies but does not produce sedative effects. It also increases appetite, and reduces the development of gastrointestinal ulcers following chronic stress.
