= Panadiplon =

Chemical compound

Clinical data
- ATC code: none

Legal status
- Legal status: See Hepatotoxic

Identifiers
- IUPAC name: 3-(5-cyclopropyl-1,2,4-oxadiazol-3-yl)-5 -propan-2-ylimidazo[5,1-c]quinoxalin-4-one
- CAS Number: 124423-84-3
- PubChem CID: 3033821
- ChemSpider: 2298411
- UNII: V4PW0S7ZP7
- KEGG: D05346
- ChEMBL: ChEMBL279867
- CompTox Dashboard (EPA): DTXSID40869698

Chemical and physical data
- Formula: C_{18}H_{17}N_{5}O_{2}
- Molar mass: 335.367 g·mol^{−1}
- 3D model (JSmol): Interactive image
- SMILES: O=C4N(c5ccccc5n3cnc(c1nc(on1)C2CC2)c34)C(C)C
- InChI: InChI=1S/C18H17N5O2/c1-10(2)23-13-6-4-3-5-12(13)22-9-19-14(15(22)18(23)24)16-20-17(25-21-16)11-7-8-11/h3-6,9-11H,7-8H2,1-2H3; Key:ZGEGOFCLSWVVKG-UHFFFAOYSA-N

Panadiplon (U-78875) is an anxiolytic drug with a novel chemical structure that is not closely related to other drugs of this type. It has a similar pharmacological profile to the benzodiazepine family of drugs, but with mainly anxiolytic properties and relatively little sedative or amnestic effect, and so is classified as a nonbenzodiazepine anxiolytic.

Panadiplon acts as a high-affinity GABA_{A} receptor partial agonist, but despite showing a useful effects profile of a potent anxiolytic with little sedative effects, panadiplon was discontinued from clinical development for use in humans after showing evidence of liver damage in both animals and human trials. Panadiplon however continues to be used in animal research, mainly as a subtype-selective reference drug to compare other GABA_{A} agonists against.
