= Lorediplon =

Chemical compound

Clinical data
- ATC code: None

Legal status
- Legal status: In general: non-regulated

Identifiers
- IUPAC name: N-{2-fluoro-5-[3-(thiophen-2-ylcarbonyl)pyrazolo[1,5-a]pyrimidin-7-yl]phenyl}-N-methylacetamide
- CAS Number: 917393-39-6
- PubChem CID: 12004146
- ChemSpider: 10176613
- UNII: VKU6Z23NSY
- ChEMBL: ChEMBL4303403
- CompTox Dashboard (EPA): DTXSID00238684

Chemical and physical data
- Formula: C_{20}H_{15}FN_{4}O_{2}S
- Molar mass: 394.42 g·mol^{−1}
- 3D model (JSmol): Interactive image
- SMILES: O=C(c2cnn3c(c1ccc(F)c(N(C(=O)C)C)c1)ccnc23)c4sccc4
- InChI: InChI=1S/C20H15FN4O2S/c1-12(26)24(2)17-10-13(5-6-15(17)21)16-7-8-22-20-14(11-23-25(16)20)19(27)18-4-3-9-28-18/h3-11H,1-2H3; Key:NQPOCLFSADOXBR-UHFFFAOYSA-N

Lorediplon (INN) is a nonbenzodiazepine of the pyrazolopyrimidine family that is being pursued as a treatment for insomnia but has not completed development.

== See also ==
- List of investigational insomnia drugs
