= Fasiplon =

Chemical compound

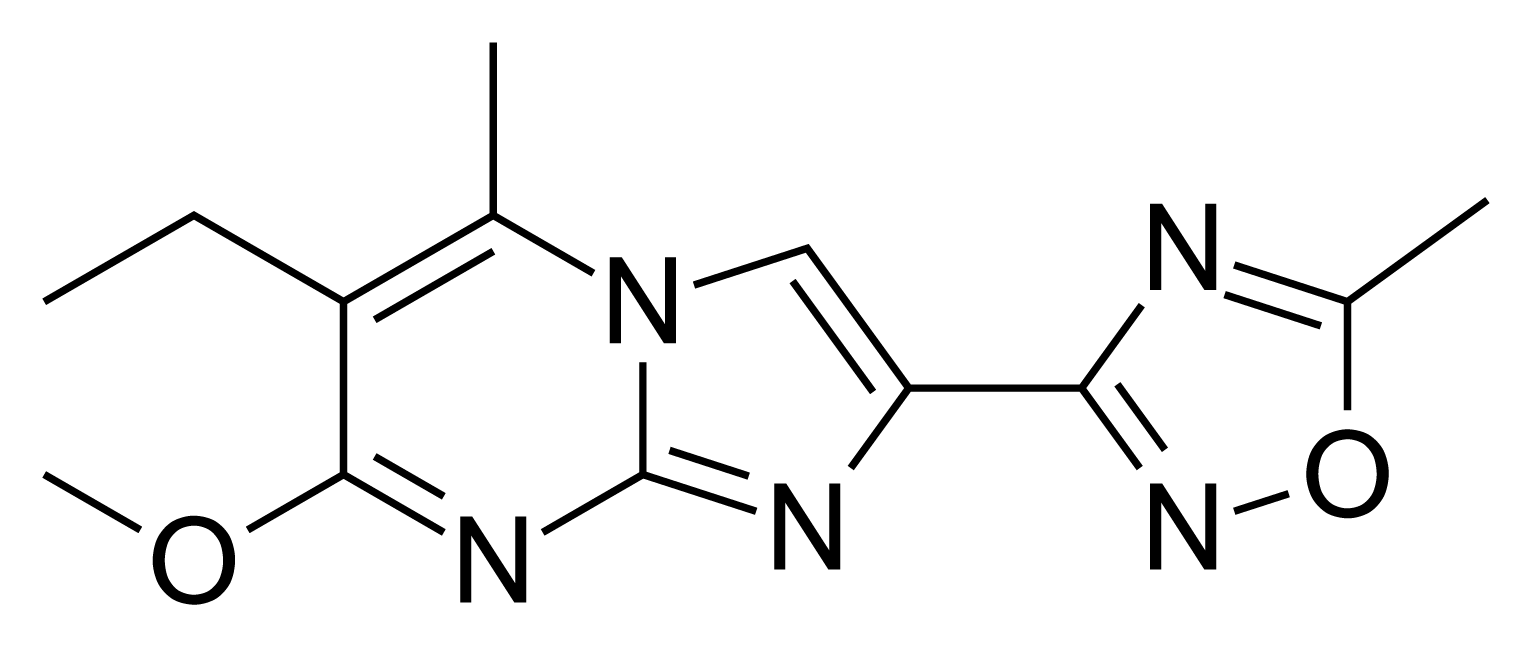

Clinical data
- ATC code: none

Identifiers
- IUPAC name: 6-Ethyl-7-methoxy-5-methyl-2-(5-methyl-[1,2,4]oxadiazol-3-yl)-imidazo[1,2-a]pyrimidine
- CAS Number: 106100-65-6
- PubChem CID: 208954
- ChemSpider: 181047
- UNII: XCA050IPGB
- ChEMBL: ChEMBL62735
- CompTox Dashboard (EPA): DTXSID70147512

Chemical and physical data
- Formula: C_{13}H_{15}N_{5}O_{2}
- Molar mass: 273.296 g·mol^{−1}
- 3D model (JSmol): Interactive image
- SMILES: CC1=NC(C2=CN3C(N=C(OC)C(CC)=C3C)=N2)=NO1
- InChI: InChI=1S/C13H15N5O2/c1-5-9-7(2)18-6-10(11-14-8(3)20-17-11)15-13(18)16-12(9)19-4/h6H,5H2,1-4H3; Key:MEBYKPLMXIRYRQ-UHFFFAOYSA-N

Fasiplon (RU 33203) is a nonbenzodiazepine anxiolytic drug from the imidazopyrimidine family of drugs.

Fasiplon binds strongly to benzodiazepine sites on the GABA_{A} receptor and has similar anxiolytic effects in animals, but with less sedative or muscle relaxant action. It was developed by a team at Roussel Uclaf in the 1990s
