= Nerisopam =

Chemical compound

Clinical data
- ATC code: none

Identifiers
- IUPAC name: 4-(7,8-dimethoxy-4-methyl-5H-2,3-benzodiazepin-1-yl)aniline
- CAS Number: 102771-12-0
- PubChem CID: 65875
- ChemSpider: 59284
- UNII: 18Q4O339AG
- ChEMBL: ChEMBL2104732
- CompTox Dashboard (EPA): DTXSID90145499

Chemical and physical data
- Formula: C_{18}H_{19}N_{3}O_{2}
- Molar mass: 309.369 g·mol^{−1}
- 3D model (JSmol): Interactive image
- SMILES: O(c1c(OC)cc/2c(c1)C/C(=N\N=C\2c3ccc(N)cc3)C)C
- InChI: InChI=1S/C18H19N3O2/c1-11-8-13-9-16(22-2)17(23-3)10-15(13)18(21-20-11)12-4-6-14(19)7-5-12/h4-7,9-10H,8,19H2,1-3H3; Key:WWQDEXGFYVSTCX-UHFFFAOYSA-N

Nerisopam (GYKI-52322, EGIS-6775) is a drug which is a 2,3-benzodiazepine derivative, related to tofisopam. It has potent anxiolytic and neuroleptic effects in animal studies.

== See also ==
- Benzodiazepine
