= HIE-124 =

Chemical compound

Identifiers
- IUPAC name: Ethyl 8-oxo-6,7-dihydro-5H-[1,3]thiazolo[3,2-a][1,3]diazepine-3-carboxylate
- CAS Number: 805326-00-5
- PubChem CID: 11447815
- ChemSpider: 9622668
- UNII: JS6A6EQZ44
- ChEMBL: ChEMBL450014

Chemical and physical data
- Formula: C_{10}H_{12}N_{2}O_{3}S
- Molar mass: 240.28 g·mol^{−1}
- 3D model (JSmol): Interactive image
- SMILES: O=C(C1=CSC(N1CCC2)=NC2=O)OCC
- InChI: InChI=1S/C10H12N2O3S/c1-2-15-9(14)7-6-16-10-11-8(13)4-3-5-12(7)10/h6H,2-5H2,1H3; Key:UXGPDPNGDCOQBY-UHFFFAOYSA-N

HIE-124 is an investigational nonbenzodiazepine drug being researched for its short acting hypnotic effects.
