= CGS-20625 =

Chemical compound

Clinical data
- Routes of administration: By mouth
- ATC code: none

Pharmacokinetic data
- Bioavailability: 41%

Identifiers
- IUPAC name: 5,6,7,8,9,10-hexahydro-2-(4-methoxyphenyl)-cyclohepta[b]pyrazolo[3,4-d]pyridin-3(2H)-one
- CAS Number: 111205-55-1
- PubChem CID: 163844
- ChemSpider: 143700
- UNII: K9Q4R9S81O
- CompTox Dashboard (EPA): DTXSID30912046

Chemical and physical data
- Formula: C_{18}H_{19}N_{3}O_{2}
- Molar mass: 309.369 g·mol^{−1}
- 3D model (JSmol): Interactive image
- SMILES: COC1=CC=C(C=C1)N2C(=O)C3=CN=C4CCCCCC4=C3N2
- InChI: InChI=1S/C18H19N3O2/c1-23-13-9-7-12(8-10-13)21-18(22)15-11-19-16-6-4-2-3-5-14(16)17(15)20-21/h7-11,20H,2-6H2,1H3; Key:UBLXQFIFWUEVGJ-UHFFFAOYSA-N

CGS-20625 is an anxiolytic drug used in scientific research. It has similar effects to benzodiazepine drugs, but is structurally distinct and so is classed as a nonbenzodiazepine anxiolytic. It produces anxiolytic and anticonvulsant effects, but with no sedative effects even at high doses, and no significant muscle relaxant effects. It is orally active in humans, but with relatively low bioavailability.

CGS-20625 is a positive allosteric modulator at several GABA_{A} receptors types. Due to its alicyclic moiety potency at γ1 subunit, containing receptor types is more pronounced for CGS-20625 compared to benzodiazepines. γ1 subunits are expressed at higher levels in the central amygdala.
