= GBLD-345 =

Chemical compound

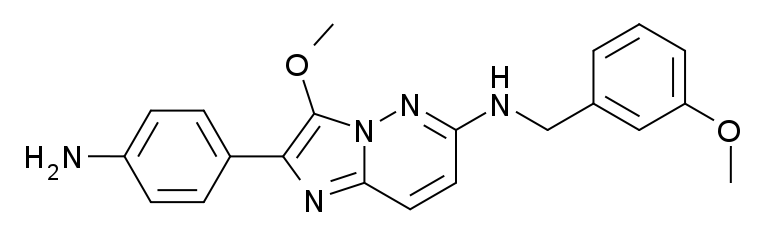

Identifiers
- IUPAC name: 2-(4-aminophenyl)-3-methoxy-N-[(3-methoxyphenyl)methyl] imidazo[2,1-f]pyridazin-6-amine
- CAS Number: 122479-08-7
- PubChem CID: 4602899
- ChemSpider: 3794457
- UNII: VW8QLT5H8X
- ChEMBL: ChEMBL1339029
- CompTox Dashboard (EPA): DTXSID301028519

Chemical and physical data
- Formula: C_{21}H_{21}N_{5}O_{2}
- Molar mass: 375.432 g·mol^{−1}
- 3D model (JSmol): Interactive image
- SMILES: COC1=CC=CC(CNC(C=C2)=NN3C2=NC(C4=CC=C(N)C=C4)=C3OC)=C1
- InChI: InChI=1S/C21H21N5O2/c1-27-17-5-3-4-14(12-17)13-23-18-10-11-19-24-20(21(28-2)26(19)25-18)15-6-8-16(22)9-7-15/h3-12H,13,22H2,1-2H3,(H,23,25); Key:HQRHGSRWOHGIRI-UHFFFAOYSA-N

GBLD-345 is an anxiolytic drug used in scientific research, which acts as a non-selective, full-efficacy positive allosteric modulator of the GABA_{A} receptor. It has similar effects to benzodiazepine drugs, but is structurally distinct and so is classed as a nonbenzodiazepine anxiolytic.
