= RWJ-51204 =

Chemical compound

Identifiers
- IUPAC name: 5-ethoxymethyl-7-fluoro-3-oxo-1,2,3,5-tetrahydrobenzo[4,5] imidazo[1,2a]pyridine-4-N-(2-fluorophenyl)carboxamide
- CAS Number: 205701-85-5
- PubChem CID: 9822240
- ChemSpider: 7997989
- UNII: NNJ1LL72JS
- ChEMBL: ChEMBL80436
- CompTox Dashboard (EPA): DTXSID90431349

Chemical and physical data
- Formula: C_{21}H_{19}F_{2}N_{3}O_{3}
- Molar mass: 399.398 g·mol^{−1}
- 3D model (JSmol): Interactive image
- SMILES: Fc1ccccc1NC(=O)C=3C(=O)CCN4c2c(cc(F)cc2)N(C=34)COCC
- InChI: InChI=1S/C21H19F2N3O3/c1-2-29-12-26-17-11-13(22)7-8-16(17)25-10-9-18(27)19(21(25)26)20(28)24-15-6-4-3-5-14(15)23/h3-8,11H,2,9-10,12H2,1H3,(H,24,28); Key:VQOQDABVGWLROX-UHFFFAOYSA-N

RWJ-51204 is an anxiolytic drug used in scientific research. It has similar effects to benzodiazepine drugs, but is structurally distinct and so is classed as a nonbenzodiazepine anxiolytic.

RWJ-51204 is a nonselective partial agonist at GABA_{A} receptors. It produces primarily anxiolytic effects at low doses, with sedative, ataxia and muscle relaxant effects only appearing at some 20x the effective anxiolytic dose. It was discovered by researchers at the pharmaceutical company Johnson & Johnson, but its development has been discontinued.
