= Taniplon =

Chemical compound

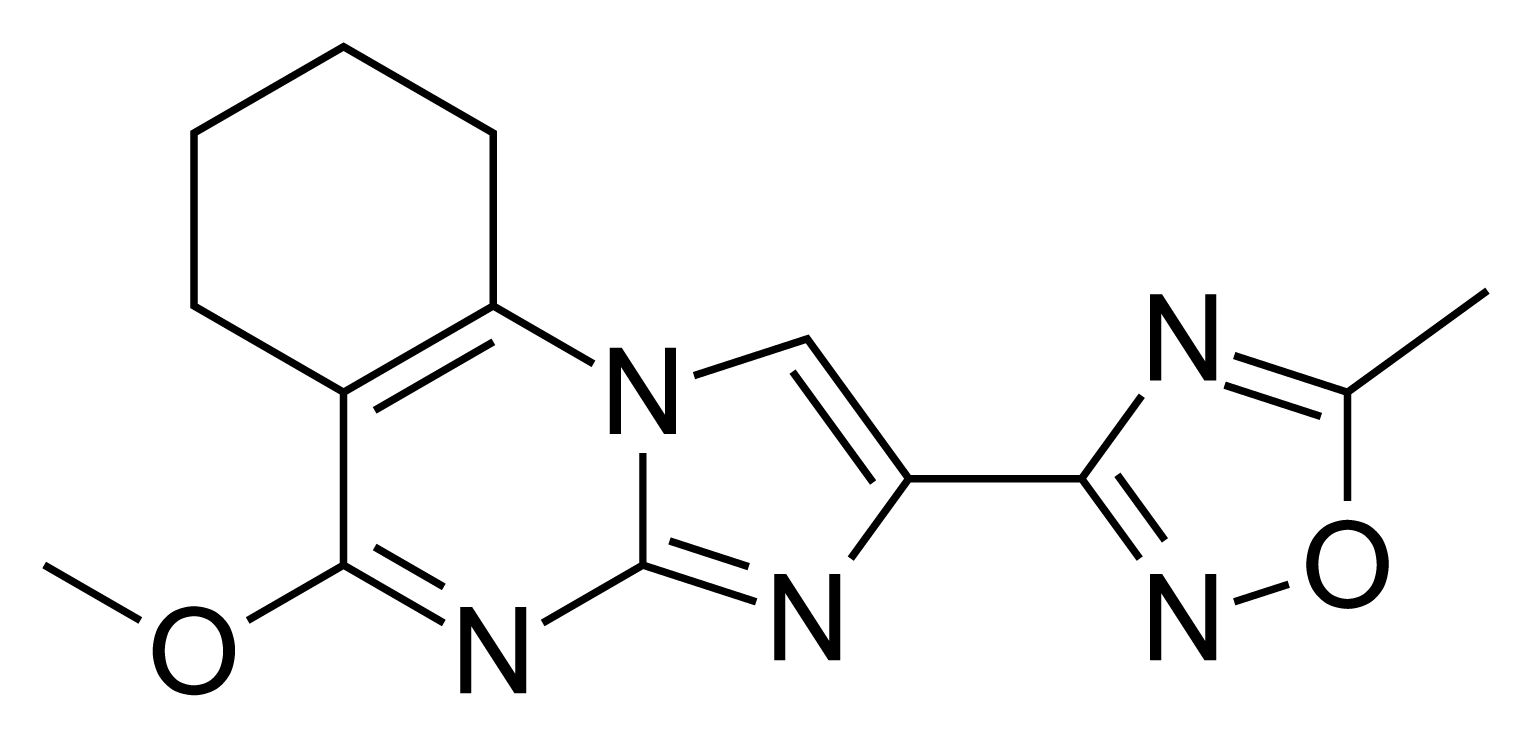

Clinical data
- ATC code: none

Identifiers
- IUPAC name: 3-(5-methoxy-6,7,8,9-tetrahydroimidazo[1,2-a]quinazolin-2-yl)-5-methyl-1,2,4-oxadiazole
- CAS Number: 106073-01-2
- PubChem CID: 3086516
- ChemSpider: 2343126
- UNII: OKS0I0BBLP
- CompTox Dashboard (EPA): DTXSID00147500

Chemical and physical data
- Formula: C_{14}H_{15}N_{5}O_{2}
- Molar mass: 285.307 g·mol^{−1}
- 3D model (JSmol): Interactive image
- SMILES: CC1=NC(C2=CN3C(N=C(OC)C4=C3CCCC4)=N2)=NO1
- InChI: InChI=1S/C14H15N5O2/c1-8-15-12(18-21-8)10-7-19-11-6-4-3-5-9(11)13(20-2)17-14(19)16-10/h7H,3-6H2,1-2H3; Key:OYKONKGGKFFMDV-UHFFFAOYSA-N

Taniplon is a nonbenzodiazepine anxiolytic drug from the imidazoquinazoline family of drugs.

Taniplon binds strongly to benzodiazepine sites on the GABA_{A} receptor and has similar anxiolytic effects in animals, but with less sedative or muscle relaxant action.
