= ELB-139 =

Chemical compound

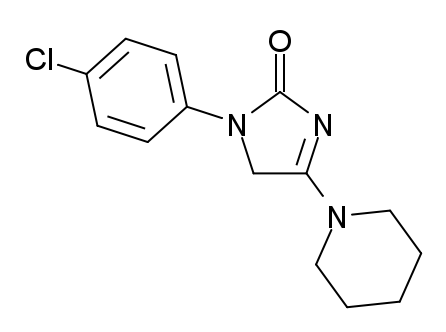

Identifiers
- IUPAC name: 1-(4-Chlorophenyl)-4-piperidin-1-yl-1,5-dihydro-imidazol-2-one
- CAS Number: 188116-08-7
- PubChem CID: 11277418
- ChemSpider: 9452418
- UNII: BKP2A5554F
- CompTox Dashboard (EPA): DTXSID40877536

Chemical and physical data
- Formula: C_{14}H_{16}ClN_{3}O
- Molar mass: 277.75 g·mol^{−1}
- 3D model (JSmol): Interactive image
- SMILES: Clc3ccc(cc3)N1CC(=NC1=O)N2CCCCC2
- InChI: InChI=1S/C14H16ClN3O/c15-11-4-6-12(7-5-11)18-10-13(16-14(18)19)17-8-2-1-3-9-17/h4-7H,1-3,8-10H2; Key:YGXIELIREXEJQN-UHFFFAOYSA-N

ELB-139 (LS-191,811) is an anxiolytic drug with a novel chemical structure, which is used in scientific research. It has similar effects to benzodiazepine drugs, but is structurally distinct and so is classed as a nonbenzodiazepine anxiolytic.

ELB-139 is a subtype-selective partial agonist at GABA_{A} receptors, with highest affinity for the α3 subtype, but highest efficacy at α1 and α2. It has primarily anxiolytic and anticonvulsant effects, but produces little sedative effects or ataxia, and has also been demonstrated in rats to increase serotonin levels in the striatum and prefrontal cortex, without affecting dopamine levels. It has been proposed as a possible candidate for a novel non-sedating anxiolytic or anticonvulsant drug for use in humans. The sponsor elbion AG registered a clinical trial in ClinicalTrials.gov for the treatment of anxiety associated with panic disorder but the results have not been reported. It was developed by Arzneimittelwerk Dresden in the 1990s.
