= NS-2664 =

Chemical compound

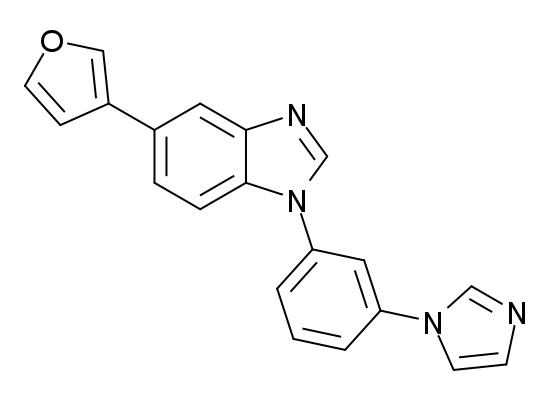

Identifiers
- IUPAC name: 5-furan-3-yl-1-(3-imidazol-1-yl-phenyl)-1H-benzoimidazole
- CAS Number: 184097-13-0
- PubChem CID: 9840300
- ChemSpider: 8016018
- UNII: Y8N5L9ASF9
- CompTox Dashboard (EPA): DTXSID501027579

Chemical and physical data
- Formula: C_{20}H_{14}N_{4}O
- Molar mass: 326.359 g·mol^{−1}
- 3D model (JSmol): Interactive image
- SMILES: c5occc5-c(cc1nc4)ccc1n4-c2cc(ccc2)-n3cncc3
- InChI: InChI=1S/C20H14N4O/c1-2-17(23-8-7-21-13-23)11-18(3-1)24-14-22-19-10-15(4-5-20(19)24)16-6-9-25-12-16/h1-14H; Key:QMKRPSVBKKEAKS-UHFFFAOYSA-N

NS-2664 (LS-193,048) is an anxiolytic drug with a novel chemical structure, developed by the small pharmaceutical company NeuroSearch. It has similar effects to benzodiazepine drugs, but is structurally distinct and so is classed as a nonbenzodiazepine anxiolytic. NS-2664 is a potent but non-selective partial agonist at GABA_{A} receptors, although with little efficacy at the α1 subtype and more at α2 and α3. It has potent anticonvulsant effects in animal studies, but a relatively short duration of action, and produces little sedative effects or physical dependence.
