= Divaplon =

Chemical compound

Clinical data
- ATC code: none

Identifiers
- IUPAC name: (6-ethyl-7-methoxy-5-methylimidazo[1,2-a]pyrimidin-2-yl)-phenylmethanone
- CAS Number: 90808-12-1
- PubChem CID: 65822
- ChemSpider: 59234
- UNII: 4AOV43246G
- ChEMBL: ChEMBL281164
- CompTox Dashboard (EPA): DTXSID40238269

Chemical and physical data
- Formula: C_{17}H_{17}N_{3}O_{2}
- Molar mass: 295.342 g·mol^{−1}
- 3D model (JSmol): Interactive image
- SMILES: CCC1=C(N2C=C(N=C2N=C1OC)C(=O)C3=CC=CC=C3)C
- InChI: InChI=1S/C17H17N3O2/c1-4-13-11(2)20-10-14(18-17(20)19-16(13)22-3)15(21)12-8-6-5-7-9-12/h5-10H,4H2,1-3H3; Key:NRJVHCSYLGLURI-UHFFFAOYSA-N

Divaplon (RU-32698) is a nonbenzodiazepine, anxiolytic and anticonvulsant drug from the imidazopyrimidine family of drugs. It acts as a partial agonist at the "benzodiazepine site" of the GABA_{A} receptor in the brain.
