= L-838,417 =

Chemical compound

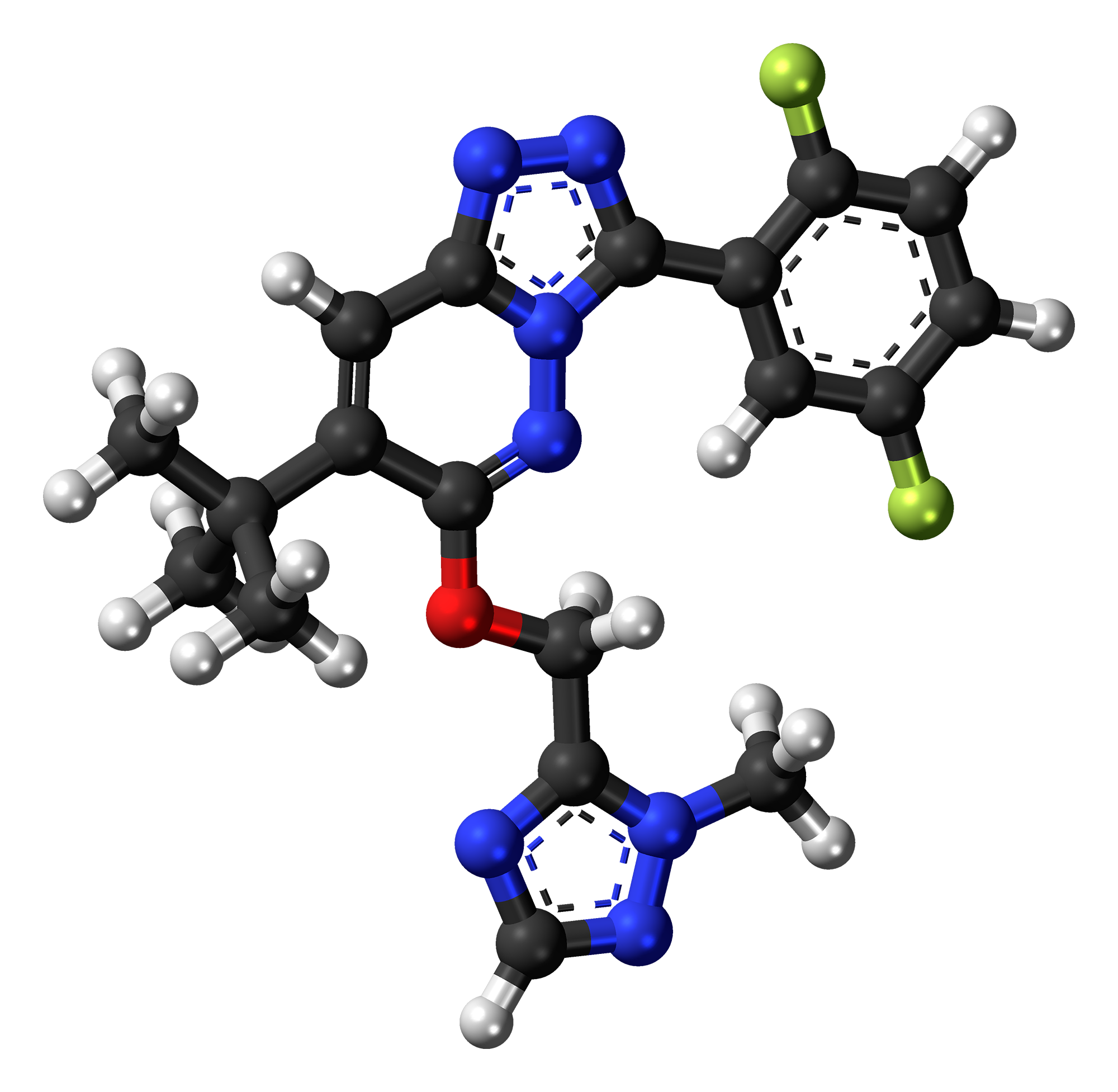

Identifiers
- IUPAC name: 3-(2,5-Difluorophenyl)-7-(1,1-dimethylethyl)-6-[(1-methyl-1H-1,2,4-triazol-5-yl)methoxy]-1,2,4-triazolo[4,3-b]pyridazine
- CAS Number: 286456-42-6
- PubChem CID: 9908880
- IUPHAR/BPS: 4241
- ChemSpider: 8084532
- UNII: 8CZO0970G3
- ChEMBL: ChEMBL373250
- CompTox Dashboard (EPA): DTXSID90432710

Chemical and physical data
- Formula: C_{19}H_{19}F_{2}N_{7}O
- Molar mass: 399.406 g·mol^{−1}
- 3D model (JSmol): Interactive image
- SMILES: CN1N=CN=C1COC4=NN2C(C=C4C(C)(C)C)=NN=C2C3=CC(F)=CC=C3F
- InChI: InChI=1S/C19H19F2N7O/c1-19(2,3)13-8-15-24-25-17(12-7-11(20)5-6-14(12)21)28(15)26-18(13)29-9-16-22-10-23-27(16)4/h5-8,10H,9H2,1-4H3; Key:BQDUNOMMYOKHEP-UHFFFAOYSA-N

L-838,417 is an anxiolytic drug used in scientific research. It has similar effects to benzodiazepine drugs, but is structurally distinct and so is classed as a nonbenzodiazepine anxiolytic. The compound was developed by Merck, Sharp and Dohme.

L-838,417 is a subtype-selective GABA_{A} positive allosteric modulator, acting as a partial agonist at α_{2}, α_{3} and α_{5} subtypes. However, it acts as a negative allosteric modulator at the α_{1} subtype, and has little affinity for the α_{4} or α_{6} subtypes. This gives it selective anxiolytic effects, which are mediated mainly by α_{2} and α_{3} subtypes, but with little sedative or amnestic effects as these effects are mediated by α_{1}. Some sedation might still be expected due to its activity at the α_{5} subtype, which can also cause sedation, however no sedative effects were seen in animal studies even at high doses, suggesting that L-838,417 is primarily acting at α_{2} and α_{3} subtypes with the α_{5} subtype of lesser importance.

As might be predicted from its binding profile, L-838,417 substitutes for the anxiolytic benzodiazepine chlordiazepoxide in animals, but not for the hypnotic imidazopyridine drug zolpidem. The synthesis of L-838,417 and similar compounds was described in 2005 in the Journal of Medicinal Chemistry.

In neuropathic pain animal models, it has been shown that stabilizing the Potassium Chloride Cotranspoter 2 (KCC2) at neuronal membranes could not only potentiate the L-838,417-induced analgesia in rats, but also rescue its analgesic potential at high doses, revealing a novel strategy for analgesia in pathological pain, by combined targeting of the appropriate GABA_{A} receptor subtypes (i.e. α_{2}, α_{3}) and restoring Cl^{−} homeostasis.

== See also ==
- α_{5}IA
- SL-651,498
- ENX-102 (TPA-023B)
