= Abecarnil =

Chemical compound

Clinical data
- Drug class: GABA_{A} receptor positive allosteric modulator; Anxiolytic
- ATC code: None

Pharmacokinetic data
- Elimination half-life: 3.4 hours (IV), 7 hours (oral)

Identifiers
- IUPAC name: propan-2-yl 4-(methoxymethyl)-6-(phenylmethoxy) -9H-pyrido[5,4-b]indole-3-carboxylate
- CAS Number: 111841-85-1
- PubChem CID: 65914
- ChemSpider: 59323
- UNII: IZM1PNJ3JL
- KEGG: D02594
- ChEMBL: ChEMBL454095
- CompTox Dashboard (EPA): DTXSID40149745

Chemical and physical data
- Formula: C_{24}H_{24}N_{2}O_{4}
- Molar mass: 404.466 g·mol^{−1}
- 3D model (JSmol): Interactive image
- SMILES: COCc3c(C(=O)OC(C)C)ncc4[nH]c2ccc(OCc1ccccc1)cc2c34
- InChI: InChI=1S/C24H24N2O4/c1-15(2)30-24(27)23-19(14-28-3)22-18-11-17(29-13-16-7-5-4-6-8-16)9-10-20(18)26-21(22)12-25-23/h4-12,15,26H,13-14H2,1-3H3; Key:RLFKILXOLJVUNF-UHFFFAOYSA-N

Abecarnil (developmental code name ZK-112,119) is an anxiolytic drug from the β-carboline family. It is one of a relatively recently developed class of medicines known as the nonbenzodiazepines, which have similar effects to the older benzodiazepine group, but with quite different chemical structures. It is a partial agonist acting selectively at the benzodiazepine site of the GABA_{A} receptor.

== Development ==
Abecarnil was originally developed as an anti-anxiety drug, but has not as yet been commercially developed for use in humans. It has mainly been used for research into the development of other new sedative and anxiolytic drugs. Investigations are continuing into its actions, and it is likely to be developed for use in the treatment of anxiety and as a less addictive substitute drug for the treatment of benzodiazepine and alcohol addiction.

== Pharmacology ==
Abecarnil is a relatively subtype-selective drug that produces primarily anxiolytic effects, with comparatively fewer sedative or muscle relaxant properties. Additionally, it does not significantly potentiate the effects of alcohol.

== Potential advantages ==
Abecarnil may have fewer problems with tolerance and withdrawal compared to nonselective full agonist benzodiazepine acting drugs.

The abuse potential of abecarnil is thought to be less than that of benzodiazepines, with only mild withdrawal symptoms noted after abrupt discontinuation of treatment.

== Photoswitchable analog ==
A photoswitchable analog of abecarnil (azocarnil) has been developed to locally and reversibly control neuroinhibition with light in wildtype animals.

== See also ==
- Substituted β-carboline
- Benzodiazepine
- Nonbenzodiazepine
