= Nonbenzodiazepine =

Class of psychoactive drugs

Chemical structure of a typical Z-drug, zolpidem

Nonbenzodiazepines (/ˌnɒnˌbɛnzoʊdaɪˈæzɪpiːn, -ˈeɪ-/), also referred to as Z-drugs (as some of the more well-known drugs begin with the letter "z"), are a class of psychoactive, depressant, sedative, hypnotic, anxiolytic drugs that are benzodiazepine-like in uses. Nonbenzodiazepine pharmacodynamics are similar in mechanism of action to benzodiazepine drugs, acting as GABA_{A} receptor positive allosteric modulators of the benzodiazepine site, and therefore exhibit similar benefits, side effects, and risks. However, nonbenzodiazepines have a different chemical structures on a molecular level.

Nonbenzodiazepines can be addictive: within days to weeks, the body can become accustomed to their effects. When the dose is then reduced or the drug is abruptly stopped, withdrawal symptoms similar to those of benzodiazepine withdrawal may result.

Nonbenzodiazepines are sometimes used in insomnia. Nonbenzodiazepines decrease sleep latency by 10 to 20 minutes. However, no benzodiazepine-like drug has shown clinically significant increase in total sleep time. Nonbenzodiazepines are recommended only to be taken at the lowest effective dose, with a duration of 2–3 weeks, for short-term insomnia. Use of nonbenzodiazepines more than 4 weeks is not recommended. It is dangerous to take nonbenzodiazepines with benzodiazepines, sedatives, alcohol or other drugs affecting the central nervous system.

== Medical uses ==
Z-drugs are used for the short-term treatment of insomnia where difficulty with sleep initiation or sleep maintenance are prominent symptoms. Long-term use is not recommended, as tolerance, dependence, and addiction can occur. Z-drugs decrease sleep latency by 10 to 20 minutes. However, no Z-drug has shown clinically significant increase in total sleep time which is defined as at least 30 minutes. Tolerance develops within days to weeks. The risk of developing tolerance with Z-drugs is comparable to benzodiazepines. Z-drugs are recommended to be taken at the lowest effective dose, with a duration of 2–3 weeks, for short-term insomnia. Use of Z-drugs more than 4 weeks is not recommended. Caution must be taken when Z-drugs are used in conjunction with benzodiazepines, sedatives, alcohol or other drugs affecting the central nervous system.

Cognitive behavioral therapy has been found to be superior to Z-drugs in the treatment of insomnia and has been found to have lasting effects on sleep quality for at least a year after therapy.

A 2004 meta-analysis of randomised controlled clinical trials that compared benzodiazepines to Z-drugs found few clear and consistent differences between zopiclone and the benzodiazepines in sleep onset latency, total sleep duration, number of awakenings, quality of sleep, adverse events, tolerance, rebound insomnia, and daytime alertness.

=== Elderly ===
A 2006 review regarding the management of insomnia and the elderly found that considerable evidence of the effectiveness and lasting benefits of nondrug treatments for insomnia exist. Compared with the benzodiazepines, the nonbenzodiazepine sedative-hypnotics offer few if any advantages in efficacy or tolerability in elderly persons. Other agents such as the melatonin receptor agonists may be more suitable and effective for the management of chronic insomnia in elderly people. Long-term use of sedative-hypnotics for insomnia lacks an evidence base and is discouraged for reasons that include concerns about such potential adverse drug effects as cognitive impairment (anterograde amnesia), daytime sedation, motor incoordination, and increased risk of motor vehicle accidents and falls.

== Classes ==
Core structures of selected nonbenzodiazepines (left three diagrams) and the structure of benzodiazepines (right) for comparison.

Currently, the major chemical classes of nonbenzodiazepines are:

Imidazopyridines

- Alpidem
- Necopidem
- Saripidem
- Zolpidem (Ambien, Ambien CR, Intermezzo, Zolpimist, Edluar, Ivadal, Sanval, Stilnox, etc.)

Pyrazolopyrimidines

- Divaplon
- Fasiplon
- Indiplon
- Lorediplon
- Ocinaplon
- Panadiplon
- Taniplon
- Zaleplon (Sonata, Starnoc, Andante)

Cyclopyrrolones

- Eszopiclone (Lunesta, Valnoc, etc.)
- Pagoclone
- Pazinaclone
- Suproclone
- Suriclone
- Zopiclone (Imovane, Zimovane, Somnol, etc.)

β-Carbolines

- Abecarnil
- Azocarnil (photoswitchable)
- Gedocarnil
- SL-651,498
- ZK-93423

Others

- AXS-17 (BAER-101, AZD-7325)
- CGS-20625
- CGS-9896
- CL-218,872
- ELB-139
- GBLD-345
- HIE-124
- L-838,417
- NS-2664
- NS-2710
- Pipequaline
- RWJ-51204
- SB-205,384
- SL-651,498
- SX-3228
- TCS-1205
- TP-003
- TP-13
- TPA-023
- Y-23684
- Etifoxine

== Pharmacology ==
The nonbenzodiazepines are positive allosteric modulators of the GABA_{A} receptor. Like the benzodiazepines, they exert their effects by binding to and activating the benzodiazepine site of the receptor complex.

=== Functional selectivity ===
Some nonbenzodiazepines can be subtype-selective, possibly providing anxiolytic effects with little to no hypnotic or amnesic effects or providing hypnotic effects with little or no anxiolytic effect. Non-sedating anxiolytic drugs derived from the same structural families as the Z-drugs have been developed, such as alpidem, indiplon, pagoclone and suriclone.

A number of non-sedating benzodiazepine anxiolytics such as imidazenil and clobazam also exist, with the caveat that neither is a traditional 1,4-benzodiazepine. The functional selectivity is not unique to the nonbenzodiazepine structural class and has more to do with selectivity among different types of GABA_{A} receptors or partial agonism, though this structural class does have more drug candidates.

== Pharmaceuticals ==
The first three nonbenzodiazepine drugs to enter the market were the "Z-drugs": zopiclone, zolpidem and zaleplon. Initially thought to compared to the benzodiazepines, have less of a tendency to induce physical dependence and addiction, although these issues can still become a problem. This has led to the Z-drugs becoming widely prescribed for the treatment of insomnia particularly in elderly patients.

Long-term use is not recommended as tolerance and addiction can occur. Zolpidem and zaleplon are, in the US, indicated for 7–10 days of use only. Longer periods of use lead to loss of efficacy from tolerance. Tolerance has also been demonstrated with zopiclone, which is indicated for a maximum of 4 weeks of use in New Zealand.

== Side effects ==
The Z-drugs are notable for producing side effects such as pronounced amnesia and more rarely hallucinations, especially when used in large doses. On rare occasions, these drugs can produce a fugue state, wherein the patient sleepwalks and may perform relatively complex actions, including cooking meals or driving cars, while effectively unconscious and with no recollection of the events upon awakening. While this effect is rare (and has also been reported to occur with some of the older sedative drugs such as temazepam and secobarbital), it can be potentially hazardous, and so further development of this class of drugs has continued in an effort to find new compounds with further improved profiles.

Daytime withdrawal-related anxiety can also occur from chronic nightly nonbenzodiazepine hypnotic usage such as with zopiclone.

Side effects can differ within the drug class due to differences in metabolism and pharmacology. For example, long-acting benzodiazepines have problems of drug accumulation especially in the elderly or those with liver disease, and shorter-acting benzodiazepines have a higher risk of more severe withdrawal symptoms. In the case of the nonbenzodiazepines, zaleplon may be the safest in terms of next-day sedation, and − unlike zolpidem and zopiclone − zaleplon has been found to have no association with increased motor vehicle accidents even when taken for middle-of-the-night insomnia due to its ultrashort elimination half-life.

A survey of patients using nonbenzodiazepine Z-drugs and benzodiazepine hypnotic users found that there was no difference in reports of adverse effects that were reported in over 41% of users and, in fact, Z-drug users were more likely to report that they had tried to quit their hypnotic drug and were more likely to want to stop taking Z-drugs than benzodiazepine users. Efficacy also did not differ between benzodiazepine and Z-drug users. A 2022 systematic review and network meta-analysis found that 40–50% of users have adverse effects from Z-drugs.

=== Increased risk of depression ===
It has been claimed that insomnia causes depression and hypothesized that insomnia medications may help to treat depression. However, an analysis of data of clinical trials submitted to the Food and Drug Administration (FDA) concerning the drugs zolpidem, zaleplon, and eszopiclone found that these sedative hypnotic drugs more than doubled the risks of developing depression compared to those taking placebo pills. Hypnotic drugs, therefore, may be contraindicated in patients with or at risk of depression. Hypnotics were found to be more likely to cause depression than to help it. Studies have found that long-term users of sedative hypnotic drugs have a markedly raised suicide risk as well as an overall increased mortality risk. Cognitive-behavioral therapy (CBT) for insomnia, on the other hand, has been found to both improve sleep quality as well as general mental health.

=== Elderly ===
In older people, Z-drugs increase the risk of fractures and falls. The 2023 Beers criteria lists all three Z-drugs approved in the US (zolpidem, zaleplon, eszolpiclon) as unsuitable for older people.

Z-drugs causes impairments in body balance and standing steadiness in individuals who wake up at night or the next morning. Falls and hip fractures are frequently reported. The combination with alcohol consumption increases these impairments. Partial, but incomplete tolerance develops to these impairments. Z-drugs increase postural sway and increases the number of falls in older people, as well as cognitive side effects. Falls are a significant cause of death in older people.

=== Other risks ===
Sleeping pills, including the Z-drugs, have been associated with an increased risk of death.

Much like benzodiazepines, Z-drugs are associated with an increased incidence of dementia. There is overall a 20% increase in dementia risk after adjusting for confounding factors. The effect is more profound in women.

== Dependence and withdrawal ==
Nonbenzodiazepines can be addictive. Nonbenzodiazepines should not be discontinued abruptly if taken for more than a few weeks due to the risk of rebound withdrawal effects and acute withdrawal reactions, which may resemble those seen during benzodiazepine withdrawal. Treatment usually entails gradually reducing the dosage over a period of weeks or several months depending on the individual, dosage, and length of time the drug has been taken. If this approach fails, a crossover to a benzodiazepine equivalent dose of a long-acting benzodiazepine (such as chlordiazepoxide or more preferably diazepam) can be tried followed by a gradual reduction in dosage. In extreme cases and, in particular, where severe addiction and/or abuse is manifested, an inpatient detoxification may be required.<

== Elderly ==
Nonbenzodiazepine hypnotic drugs, similar to benzodiazepines, cause impairments in body balance and standing steadiness upon waking; falls and hip fractures are frequently reported. The combination with alcohol increases these impairments. Partial but incomplete tolerance develops to these impairments. In general, nonbenzodiazepines are not recommended for older patients due to the increased risk of falls and fractures. An extensive review of the medical literature regarding the management of insomnia and the elderly found that there is considerable evidence of the effectiveness and lasting benefits of non-drug treatments for insomnia in adults of all age groups and that these interventions are underused. Compared with the benzodiazepines, the nonbenzodiazepine sedative-hypnotics offer little if any advantages in efficacy or tolerability in elderly persons. It was found that newer agents such as the melatonin agonists may be more suitable and effective for the management of chronic insomnia in elderly people. Long-term use of sedative-hypnotics for insomnia lacks an evidence base and is discouraged for reasons that include concerns about such potential adverse drug effects as cognitive impairment (anterograde amnesia), daytime sedation, motor incoordination, and increased risk of motor vehicle accidents and falls. In addition, the effectiveness and safety of long-term use of these agents remain to be determined. It was concluded that further research is needed to evaluate the long-term effects of treatment and the most appropriate management strategy for elderly persons with chronic insomnia.

== Safety ==
A review of the literature regarding hypnotics including the nonbenzodiazepine Z-drugs concluded that these drugs carry a significant risk to the individual. The risks include dependence, accidents, and other adverse effects. Gradual discontinuation of hypnotics may lead to improved health without worsening of sleep. It is preferred that they should be prescribed for only a few days at the lowest effective dose and avoided wherever possible in the elderly.

== History ==
Z-drugs emerged in the last years of the 1980s and early 1990s, with zopiclone (Imovane) approved by the British National Health Service as early as 1989, quickly followed by Sanofi with zolpidem (Ambien). By 1999, King Pharmaceuticals had finalized approval with the American Food and Drug Administration (FDA) to market zaleplon (Sonata, Starnoc) across the US. In 2005, the FDA approved eszopiclone (Lunesta) the (S)-enantiomer of zopiclone. That same year, 2005, the FDA finalized approval for Ambien CR, or extended-release zolpidem. Most recently, in 2012 the FDA approved Intermezzo (zolpidem tartate sublingual), which is marketed for middle-of-the-night insomnia, available in doses only half of the strength of immediate-release zolpidem tartrate to avoid residual next-day sedation.
