= GABRA2 =

Protein in humans

Identifiers
- Aliases: GABRA2, gamma-aminobutyric acid type A receptor alpha2 subunit
- External IDs: OMIM: 137140; MGI: 95614; GeneCards: GABRA2

Gene location (Human)
Chr.	Chromosome 4 (human)
Band	4p12	Start	46,248,427 bp
Band	4p12	End	46,475,230 bp
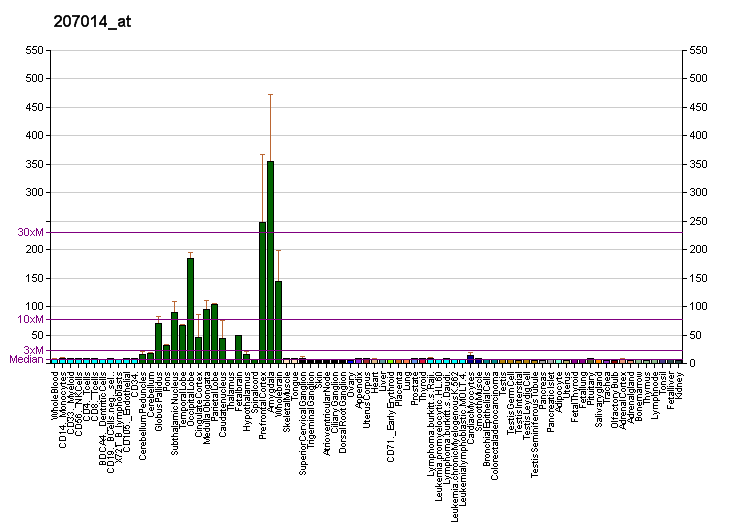

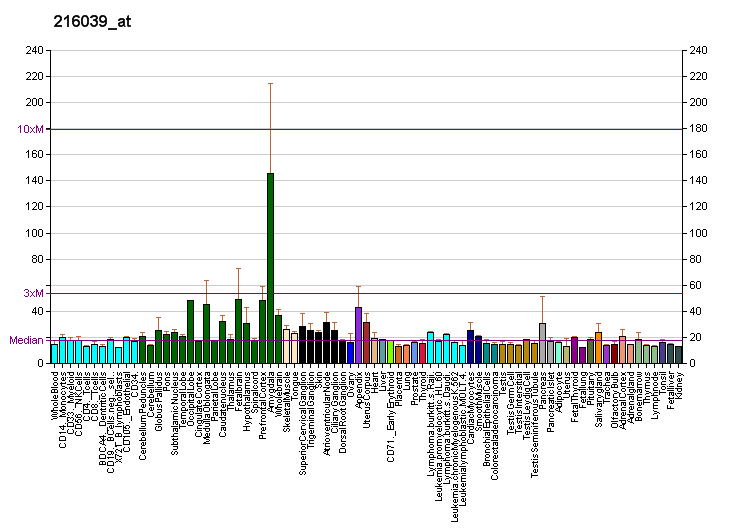
RNA expression pattern
Bgee	Human / Mouse (ortholog); Top expressed in: frontal pole; entorhinal cortex; postcentral gyrus; Brodmann area 23; superior frontal gyrus; middle temporal gyrus; occipital lobe; primary visual cortex; Brodmann area 46; caudate nucleus / n/a; More reference expression data
BioGPS	More reference expression data
Gene ontology
Molecular function	GABA-A receptor activity; ion channel activity; benzodiazepine receptor activity; extracellular ligand-gated ion channel activity; chloride channel activity; GABA-gated chloride ion channel activity; transmembrane signaling receptor activity; inhibitory extracellular ligand-gated ion channel activity; transmitter-gated ion channel activity involved in regulation of postsynaptic membrane potential
Cellular component	integral component of membrane; chloride channel complex; membrane; synapse; plasma membrane; cell junction; integral component of synaptic vesicle membrane; postsynaptic membrane; cytoplasmic vesicle membrane; cytoplasmic vesicle; GABA-A receptor complex; integral component of plasma membrane; dendrite membrane; neuron projection; postsynapse; dendrite; cell projection
Biological process	gamma-aminobutyric acid signaling pathway; chloride transport; regulation of neurotransmitter levels; neurotransmitter transport; ion transport; chloride transmembrane transport; ion transmembrane transport; signal transduction; chemical synaptic transmission; regulation of membrane potential; nervous system process; synaptic transmission, GABAergic; regulation of postsynaptic membrane potential; inhibitory synapse assembly
Sources:Amigo / QuickGO
Orthologs
Databases	NCBI: entry; OMA: entry
Species	Human	Mouse
Entrez	2555	14395
Ensembl	ENSG00000151834	n/a
UniProt	P47869	P26048
RefSeq (mRNA)	NM_000807; NM_001114175; NM_001286827; NM_001330690	NM_008066
RefSeq (protein)	NP_000798; NP_001107647; NP_001273756; NP_001317619; NP_001364073 NP_001364074; NP_001364075; NP_001364076; NP_001364077; NP_001364078; NP_001364079; NP_001364080; NP_001364081; NP_001364082; NP_001364083; NP_001364084	NP_032092
Location (UCSC)	Chr 4: 46.25 – 46.48 Mb	n/a
PubMed search
- Wikidata
View/Edit Human	View/Edit Mouse

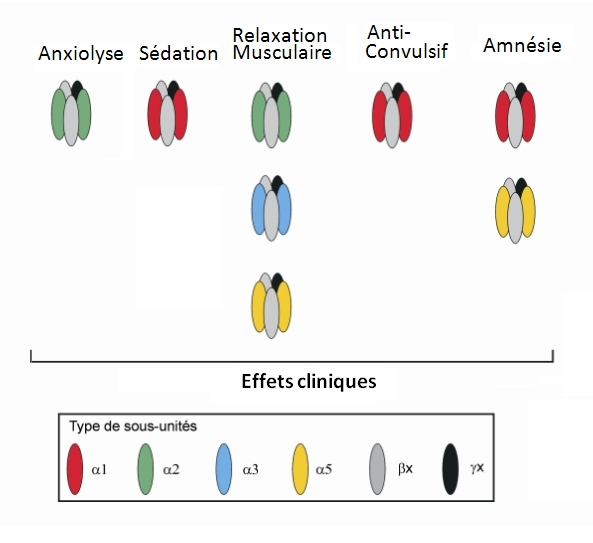
GABA receptor types and their clinical functions. Notice that α2 receptor type refers to the GABRA2, an anxiolyte.

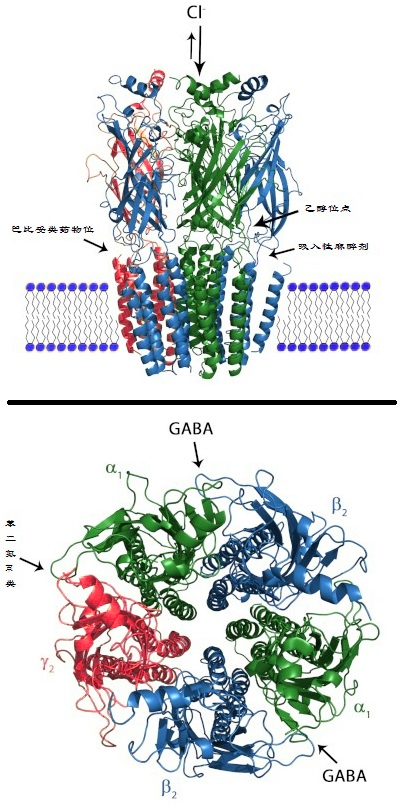
GABAA receptor animation demonstrates the various subunit types that make up the GABA receptor. All the variants of GABA (A) receptors have different functions within the mammalian brain.

Gamma-aminobutyric acid receptor subunit alpha-2 is a protein in humans that is encoded by the GABRA2 gene.

GABRA2 is an alpha subunit that is part of GABA-A receptors, which are ligand-gated chloride channels and are activated by the major inhibitory neurotransmitter in the mammalian brain, GABA. Chloride conductance of these channels can be modulated by agents, such as benzodiazepines (psychoactive drugs) that bind to the GABA-A receptor.

GABA-A receptors are composed of two alpha, two beta, and one gamma subunits. They have at least 16 distinct subunits identified, including GABRA2. This receptor is found mainly in specific regions of the brain, such as the hippocampus.

Subunit isoforms are seen around in various locations in the brain throughout growth. The combination of subunits has a large effect on the pharmacological and biophysical characteristics. GABRA2 has been found to mediate anxiolytic activity, which plays a key role in emotional and behavioral control. Most GABRA2 modifications have been found to be linked to alcoholism and adolescent behavior.

== Structure ==
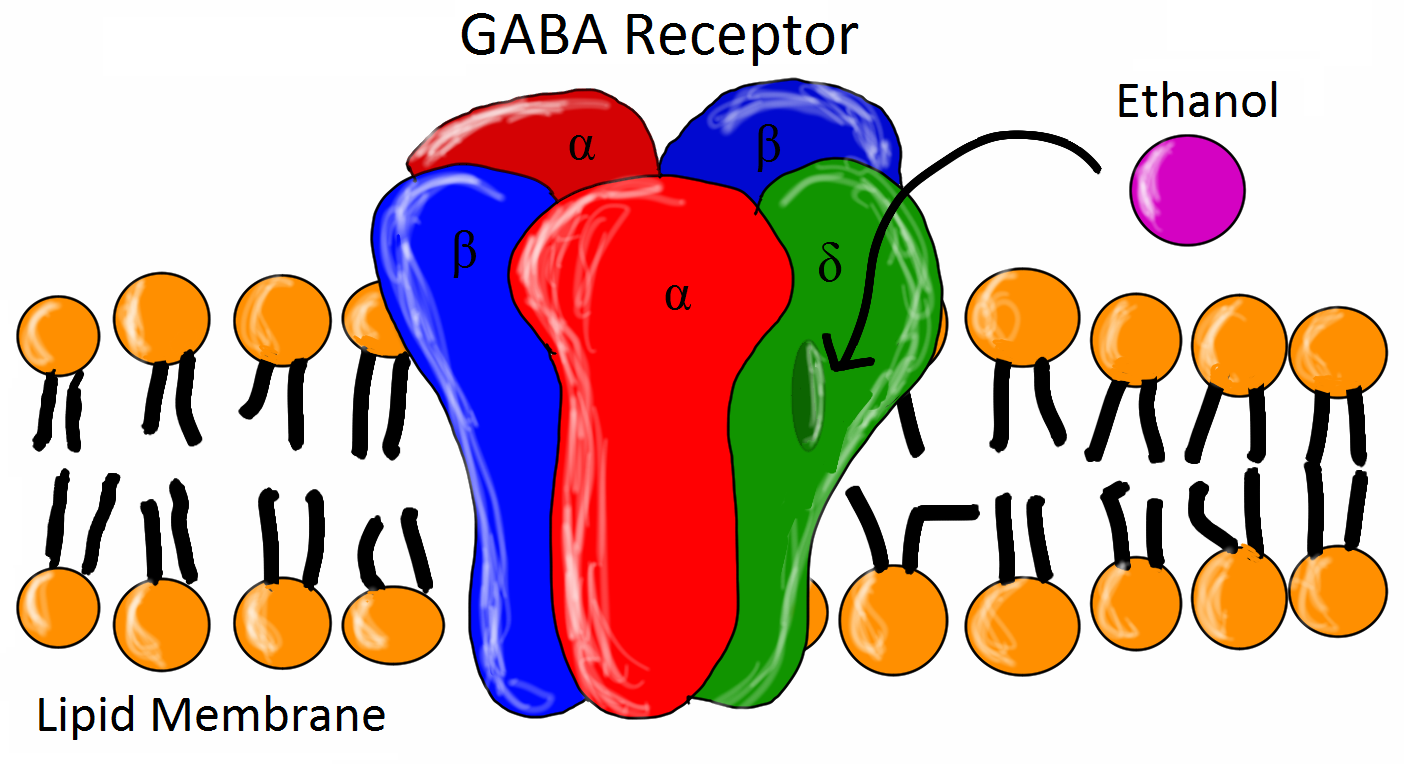
Shows the five subunits that comprise the GABA-A receptor. GABRA2 is only one alpha subunit in the structure demonstrated with the color red.

GABRA2 is one of the 16 distinct alpha subunits found for the GABA receptor. GABA-A has a pentametric form, with two alpha, two beta, and one gamma subunit. The various subunit isoforms seen in the GABA-A receptor structure have an effect on its function. GABRA2 is most often seen as part of the most common expression α2β3γ2, which is seen in 13% of all GABA-A receptors. The subunit, GABRA2, is found primarily in the hippocampus and/or the forebrain. It is more confined to areas of the brain in comparison to other alpha subunits seen in GABA-A receptors. It is present in 35% of all GABA-A receptors being the fourth most abundant subunit next to GABRA1 and various beta subunits. Like all subunits, it is made from structurally distinct proteins. The presence of this subunit causes an easier binding of benzodiazepine which is a category of psychoactive drugs.

== Function ==
GABRA2 mediates neural activity necessary for information processing in inter-neurons. GABRA2 participates in transporting Cl^{−} ions into the membrane, since it forms part of the GABA-A receptor. The influx of Cl^{−} causes the hyper-polarization of the membrane, leading to inhibitory actions.

GABRA2 increases the risk of anxiety making it a target for treating behavioral disorders. Some examples of behavioral disorders include anxiety, alcohol dependence, and drug use. GABRA2 is a binding site for benzodiazepines. Benzodiazepines are psychoactive drugs known to reduce anxiety. Benzodiazepines bind to GABRA2 causing chloride channels to open, leading to the hyper-polarization of the membrane. One such benzodiazepine, Clobazam, targets this alpha subunit in GABA-A to induce inhibitory effects.

GABRA2 is associated with reward behavior when it activates the insula. The insula is part of the cerebral cortex responsible for emotions. GABRA2 role in reward behavior explains the higher risk of alcohol dependence and drug use behavior.

== Clinical significance ==
Since GABRA 2 mediates anxiolytic activity, it is a key receptor for emotional control. Several developmental stages of GABRA2 have shown effects on behavior such as adult alcohol dependence and adolescent behavior.

=== Alcoholism ===
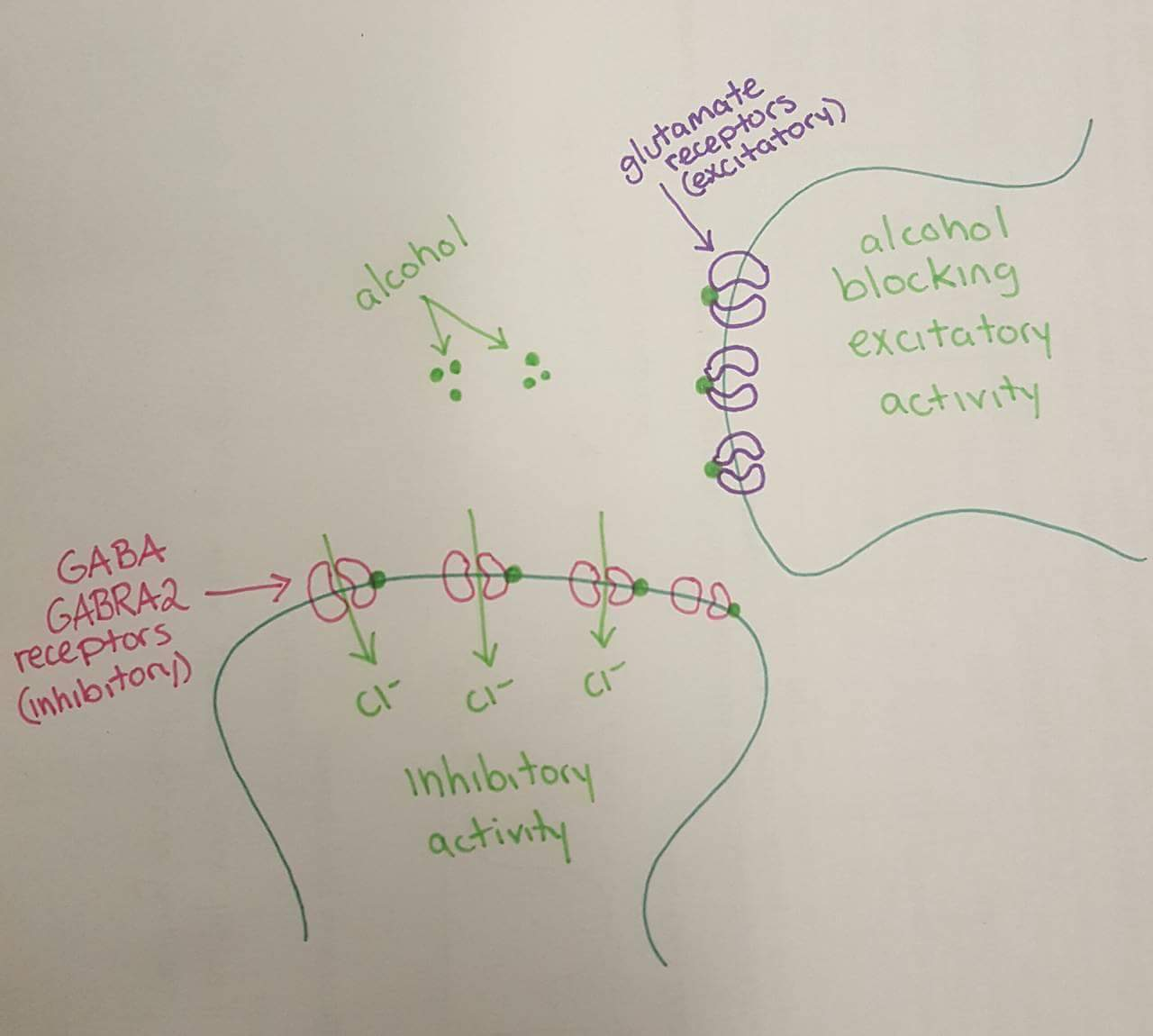
This is a representation of alcohol's effects on GABA receptors and glutamate receptors.

Since GABRA 2 subunit mediates anxiolytic activity, long term use or withdrawal of ethanol can cause dependence alterations in the GABA-A receptor.

When alcohol is present in the brain, it affects two types of receptors: GABA-A, inhibitory receptors, and Glutamate, excitatory receptors. In GABA receptors, alcohol substrates bind allosterically, which allows the GABA receptors to increase their inhibitory activity. Besides giving GABA receptors an extra inhibitory punch, alcohol substrates bind to glutamate receptors, which blocks its excitatory activity. Alcohol effects on both of these metabolic pathways obstruct the brain from making memories, making well thought out decisions, and controlling impulses after long term use.

Collaborative Study on Genetics of Alcoholism (COGA) identified alcohol dependence on chromosome 4p, where SNP genotyping, and measurement of genetic variation, found GABRA2's association with alcoholism within European and African ancestries. Most of these findings were strongly associated with early alcohol use and along with drug dependence. Besides these findings, COGA investigators identified GABRA2 associated with impulsiveness and found other phenotypes affected by alcohol such as EEG-β.

=== Adolescent behavior ===
The International Behavioural and Neural Genetics Society reviewed studies that found a linkage between β1-subunits in GABA-A receptors and excitability in the reward sensitivity behavior brain region. The linkage between these two suggests that inadequate GABRA2 variants can cause the development of mental disorders, such as addiction. The addictive behaviors can be seen as aggressive and defiant, but most of these behaviors can be caused by both genetic and environmental factors.

GABRA2 genes have been linked to various behavioral traits, such as an absence of impulse control. At least 11 single nucleotide polymorphisms, or SNPs, within the GARBRA2 gene have been correlated to impulsivity and four of which were also found in alcoholism. There was an elevated neuronal activation in the insula and the Nucleus accumbens. In animals, such as rats, a relationship was found between elevated alcohol consumption and increased impulsivity to those exposed to stress at an early stage in life. This impulsivity can be reversed with pharmacological handling of GABA-A receptors containing GABRA2 in certain neurological areas.

== Ligands ==
=== Positive allosteric modulators ===
Selective positive allosteric modulators of the α2-containing GABA-A receptor produce anxioselective effects.

- Alpidem
- Clobazam
- TPA-023
- L-838,417

== See also ==
- GABA_{A} receptor
