= GABRA1 =

Protein-coding gene in humans

An Error has occurred retrieving Wikidata item for infobox Gamma-aminobutyric acid receptor subunit alpha-1 is a protein that in humans is encoded by the GABRA1 gene.

GABA is the major inhibitory neurotransmitter in the mammalian brain where it acts at GABA-A receptors, which are ligand-gated chloride channels. Chloride conductance of these channels can be modulated by agents such as benzodiazepines that bind to the GABA-A receptor. At least 16 distinct subunits of GABA-A receptors have been identified.

The GABRA1 receptor is the specific target of the z-drug class of nonbenzodiazepine hypnotic agents and is responsible for their hypnotic and hallucinogenic effects. The receptor also mediates the psychoactivity of muscimol, whose effects are qualitatively similar to those of Z-drugs.

== See also ==
- GABA_{A} receptor
