= List of investigational antidepressants =

List of pharmaceutical drugs under clinical development for treatment of depression

This is a list of investigational antidepressants, or drugs that are currently under development for clinical use in the treatment of depression but are not yet approved. Specific indications include major depressive disorder, treatment-resistant depression, dysthymia, bipolar depression, and postpartum depression, among others.

Chemical/generic names are listed first, with developmental code names, synonyms, and brand names in parentheses.

This list was last comprehensively updated in August 2024. It is likely to become outdated with time.

== Under development ==
=== Phase 3 ===
- Cycloserine/lurasidone (Cyclurad; NRX-101) – ionotropic glutamate NMDA receptor glycine site partial agonist and atypical antipsychotic (non-selective monoamine receptor modulator) combination
- Deupsilocin (HLP003; HLP-003; CYB003; CYB-003; deuterated psilocybin analogue; deuterated psilocin) – serotonin 5-HT_{2A} receptor agonist and psychedelic hallucinogen
- Esmethadone (dextromethadone; REL-1017) – ionotropic glutamate NMDA receptor antagonist and other actions
- Ketamine (HTX-100; NRX-100) – ionotropic glutamate NMDA receptor antagonist
- Lysergic acid diethylamide (LSD; MM-120) – non-selective serotonin receptor agonist and psychedelic hallucinogen
- Navacaprant (BTRX-140; BTRX-335140; CYM-53093; NMRA-140; NMRA-335140) – κ-opioid receptor antagonist
- Osavampator (TAK-653; NBI-1065845; NBI-845) – ionotropic glutamate AMPA receptor positive allosteric modulator
- Pimavanserin (ACP-103; BVF-048; Nuplazid) – serotonin 5-HT_{2A} and 5-HT_{2C} receptor antagonist or inverse agonist
- Psilocybin (COMP-360) – non-selective serotonin receptor agonist and psychedelic hallucinogen
- Psilocybin (Usona Institute) – non-selective serotonin receptor agonist and psychedelic hallucinogen
- Seltorexant (JNJ-42847922; JNJ-7922; MIN-202) – orexin OX_{2} receptor antagonist
- SEP-4199 (non-racemic amisulpride; aramisulpride/esamisulpride [85:15 ratio]) – atypical antipsychotic (dopamine D_{2} and D_{3} receptor antagonist and serotonin 5-HT_{2B} and 5-HT_{7} receptor antagonist)
- SNG-12 (Synapsinae) – glycine transporter 1 (GlyT1) inhibitor
- Solriamfetol (Sunosi; JZP-110; SKLN05; ARL-N05; YKP-10A; R-228060; ADX-N05) – norepinephrine and dopamine reuptake inhibitor and trace amine-associated receptor 1 (TAAR1) agonist
- Ulotaront (SEP-363856; SEP-856) – serotonin 5-HT_{1A} receptor agonist and trace amine-associated receptor 1 (TAAR1) agonist

=== Phase 2/3 ===
- PRAX-114 – extrasynaptic GABA_{A} receptor-preferring positive allosteric modulator and neurosteroid

=== Phase 2 ===
- 4-Chlorokynurenine (4-CL-KYN; AV-101) – ionotropic glutamate NMDA receptor glycine site antagonist and kynurenine modulator
- Ademetionine (MSI-190; MSI-195; S-Adenosyl-L-Methionine; Sam-E; SAMe; Strada) – cofactor in monoamine neurotransmitter biosynthesis
- ALTO-203 – histamine H_{3} receptor inverse agonist
- Amdiglurax (ALTO-100, NSI-189) – unknown mechanism of action (hippocampal neurogenesis stimulant and indirect brain-derived neurotrophic factor (BDNF) modulator)
- Apimostinel (AGN-241660; GATE-202; NRX-1074) – ionotropic glutamate NMDA receptor glycine site partial agonist
- Arketamine ((R)-ketamine; PCN-101) – ionotropic glutamate NMDA receptor antagonist
- Azetukalner (1OP-2198; encukalner; VRX-621698; XEN-1101; XPF-008) – KCNQ potassium channel agonist
- BI-1358894 – transient receptor potential cation TRPC4 and TRPC5 channel inhibitor
- BI-1569912 – NR2B subunit-containing ionotropic glutamate NMDA receptor negative allosteric modulator
- Blixeprodil (GM-1020; (R)-4-fluorodeschloroketamine ((R)-4-FDCK) – ionotropic glutamate NMDA receptor antagonist
- Bretisilocin (GM-2505; 5F-MET; 5-fluoro-N-methyl-N-ethyltryptamine) – serotonin 5-HT_{2A} and 5-HT_{2C} receptor agonist, serotonin 5-HT_{2B} receptor antagonist, psychedelic hallucinogen, and serotonin releasing agent
- Brezivaptan (ANC-501; THY-1773; TS-1211; TS-121) – vasopressin V_{1b} receptor antagonist
- CB-03 (CB-04; CB-003; CB03-154) – KCNQ2 and KCNQ3 potassium channel stimulant
- Centanafadine (CTN; EB-1020) – serotonin, norepinephrine, and dopamine reuptake inhibitor
- Deudextromethorphan/quinidine (AVP-786; CTP-786; d-DM/Q; d6-DM/Q; deuterated dextromethorphan/ultra-low-dose quinidine) – sigma σ_{1} receptor agonist, serotonin reuptake inhibitor, ionotropic glutamate NMDA receptor antagonist, other actions, and CYP2D6 inhibitor combination
- Dimethyltryptamine (N,N-Dimethyltryptamine; DMT; N,N-DMT; BMND-01; BMND-02; BMND-03) – non-selective serotonin receptor agonist and psychedelic hallucinogen
- Elunetirom (ABX-002; MA-JD21; LL-340001 prodrug) – thyroid hormone receptor β (TRβ) agonist
- Emestedastat (UE-2343; Xanamem) – 11β-hydroxysteroid dehydrogenase type 1 (11β-HSD1) inhibitor (glucocorticoid synthesis inhibitor)
- Esketamine (CLE-100) – ionotropic glutamate NMDA receptor antagonist
- FKB-01MD (FKB01MD; TGBA-01AD; TGBA01AD) – serotonin reuptake inhibitor, serotonin 5-HT_{1A} receptor agonist, serotonin 5-HT_{1D} receptor modulator, and serotonin 5-HT_{2} receptor agonist
- Forvisirvat (SP-624) – sirtuin 6 (SIRT6) stimulant
- Itruvone (PH-10; PH-10A; PH10-NS) – chemoreceptor cell stimulant, vomeropherine, and neurosteroid
- JNJ-54175446 (JNJ-5446) – purinergic P2X_{7} receptor antagonist
- JNJ-55308942 – purinergic P2X_{7} receptor antagonist
- Ketamine (extended-release; R-107; R107) – ionotropic glutamate NMDA receptor antagonist
- Ketamine (intranasal; Ereska; PMI-100; PMI-150; SLS-002; TUR-002) – ionotropic glutamate NMDA receptor antagonist
- Ketamine (prolonged-release oral; KET-01) – ionotropic glutamate NMDA receptor antagonist
- Liafensine (BMS-820836; DB-104) – serotonin, norepinephrine, and dopamine reuptake inhibitor
- Lisdexamfetamine (Vyvanse) – norepinephrine and dopamine releasing agent
- Lithium cocrystal (AL-001; LiProSal; lithium salicylate L-proline ionic cocrystal) – unknown mechanism of action and mood stabilizer (improved formulation of lithium)
- Luvesilocin (RE-104/RE104, FT-104/FT104; 4-HO-DiPT/iprocin prodrug) – serotonin 5-HT_{2A} receptor agonist and psychedelic hallucinogen
- Lysergic acid diethylamide (LSD; MB-22001) – non-selective serotonin receptor agonist and psychedelic hallucinogen
- Mebufotenin (5-MeO-DMT; 5-Methoxy-N,N-Dimethyltryptamine; BPL-002; BPL-003) – non-selective serotonin receptor agonist and psychedelic hallucinogen
- Mefluleucine (NV-5138; SPN-820/SPN-821) – sestrin2 modulator and mammalian target of rapamycin complex 1 (mTORC1) stimulant
- Mifepristone (Mifeprex; RU-38486; RU-486) – progesterone receptor antagonist, glucocorticoid receptor antagonist, and androgen receptor antagonist
- NBI-1070770 – NR2B subunit-containing ionotropic glutamate NMDA receptor negative allosteric modulator
- Nelivaptan (SR-149415; BH-200) – vasopressin V_{1B} receptor antagonist
- NORA-520 (brexanolone prodrug) – GABA_{A} receptor positive allosteric modulator and neurosteroid
- Onabotulinum toxin A (BoNTA; Botox; Botulinum toxin A injectable; GSK-1358820; OnabotA X; onabotulinumtoxinA X; Vistabel; Vistabex) – acetylcholine release inhibitor and neuromuscular blocking agent
- Onfasprodil (CAD-9271; MIJ-821; MIJ821) – NR2B subunit-containing ionotropic glutamate NMDA receptor negative allosteric modulator
- ONO-1110 – endocannabinoid synthesis regulator and indirect cannabinoid receptor modulator
- Opakalim (BHV-7000; BPN-25203; KB-3061) – KCNQ potassium channel agonist
- OPC-64005 – serotonin, norepinephrine, and dopamine reuptake inhibitor
- OSU-6162 (PNU-9639; PNU-96391; PNU-96391A) – serotonin 5-HT_{2A} receptor partial agonist (non-hallucinogenic), dopamine D_{2} receptor partial agonist, and sigma σ_{1} receptor ligand (so-called "monoaminergic stabilizer")
- PDC-1421 (ABV-1504; ABV-1505; ABV-1601; BLI-1005) – norepinephrine reuptake inhibitor
- Pegipanermin (DN-TNF; INB-03; LIVNate; Quellor; XENP-1595; XENP-345; XPro-1595; XPro595; XPro) – tumor necrosis factor α (TNFα) inhibitor
- PIPE-307 (JNJ-5120; JNJ-89495120) – muscarinic acetylcholine M_{1} receptor antagonist
- Pramipexole (CTC-413; CTC-501) – dopamine D_{2}, D_{3}, and D_{4} receptor agonist
- Pramipexole/ondansetron (ALTO-207, CTC-501) – combination of pramipexole (dopamine D_{2}-like receptor agonist) and ondansetron (serotonin 5-HT_{3} receptor antagonist)
- Pregnenolone methyl ether (3β-methoxypregnenolone; MAP-4343) – microtubule-associated protein (MAP) stimulant and tubulin polymerization promoter
- Ralmitaront (RG-7906; RO-6889450) – trace amine-associated receptor 1 (TAAR1) agonist
- Rislenemdaz (AVTX-301; CERC-301; MK-0657) – NR2B subunit-containing ionotropic glutamate NMDA receptor negative allosteric modulator
- Ropanicant (SUVN-911) – α_{4}β_{2} nicotinic acetylcholine receptor antagonist
- Tebideutorexant (JNJ-61393215; JNJ-3215) – orexin OX_{1} receptor antagonist
- Tildacerfont (SPR-001; LY-2371712) – corticotropin releasing factor receptor 1 (CRF_{1}) antagonist
- Tramadol (controlled-release; ETS-6103; ETX-6103; Viotra) – μ-opioid receptor agonist, serotonin and norepinephrine reuptake inhibitor, serotonin 5-HT_{2C} receptor antagonist, and other actions
- TS-161 – metabotropic glutamate mGlu_{2} and mGlu_{3} receptor antagonist
- Zelquistinel (AGN-241751; GATE-251) – ionotropic glutamate NMDA receptor partial positive allosteric modulator

=== Phase 1/2 ===
- PT-00114 (PT100114) – corticotropin releasing hormone (CRH) inhibitor

=== Phase 1 ===
- ACD856 (ACD-856) – tropomyosin receptor kinase TrkA, TrkB, and TrkC positive allosteric modulator
- Agomelatine (ALTO-300; agomelatine 25 mg formulation) – serotonin 5-HT_{2C} receptor antagonist and melatonin MT_{1} and MT_{2} receptor agonist
- BMND07 (BMND-07; dimethyltryptamine or 5-MeO-DMT combination drug) – non-selective serotonin receptor agonist, serotonergic hallucinogen, and other actions combination
- BRII-296 (extended-release injectable aqueous suspension formulation of brexanolone) – GABA_{A} receptor positive allosteric modulator and neurosteroid
- Brilaroxazine (RP-5000; RP-5063) – atypical antipsychotic (non-selective monoamine receptor modulator)
- Carbidopa/oxitriptan (EVX-101) – serotonin precursor (5-hydroxytryptophan; 5-HTP) and aromatic L-amino acid decarboxylase (AAAD) inhibitor combination
- Crisdesalazine (AAD-2004) – microsomal prostaglandin E2 synthase-1 (mPGES-1) inhibitor
- DGX-001 (ZZ-2103) – gastrointestinally selective vasopressin V_{1A} receptor agonist, peptide, and gut–brain axis modulator
- Dimethyltryptamine (N,N-dimethyltryptamine; DMT; N,N-DMT; VLS-01) – non-selective serotonin receptor agonist and psychedelic hallucinogen
- DSP-3456 – metabotropic glutamate mGlu_{2} and mGlu_{3} receptor negative allosteric modulator
- Ebselen (DR-3305; Harmokisane; PZ-51; SPI-1005; SPI-3005) – multiple mechanisms of action
- ENX-205 – dopamine D_{2} and D_{3} receptor antagonist and serotonin 5-HT_{1A} and 5-HT_{2A} receptor agonist
- Icalcaprant (CVL-354) – κ-opioid receptor antagonist
- KAR-2618 (GFB-887) – transient receptor potential cation TRPC4 and TRPC5 channel inhibitor
- SAL-0114 – undefined mechanism of action
- Scopolamine (DPI-385-CVS; DPI-386; DPI-386 Nasal Gel; DPI-386-SG; DPI-386-SS; DPI-387; DPI-521-CG; DPI-550-TBI; INSCOP spray) – non-selective muscarinic acetylcholine receptor antagonist
- Traneurocin (NA-831; Cycloprolylglycine; CPG) – unknown or undefined / ionotropic glutamate AMPA receptor positive allosteric modulator, GABA_{A} receptor positive allosteric modulator, and racetam-like drug
- XW-10508 (oral esketamine conjugate prodrug) – ionotropic glutamate NMDA receptor antagonist
- Zalsupindole (DLX-001; DLX-1; AAZ; AAZ-A-154) – non-hallucinogenic serotonin 5-HT_{2A} receptor agonist

=== Preclinical ===
- 2-Bromo-LSD (bromolysergide; BETR-001, TD-0148A) – non-hallucinogenic serotonin 5-HT_{2A} receptor agonist and other actions
- AKO-003 (ketamine-based psychedelic formulation; ketamine/specific plant bioactive) – ionotropic glutamate NMDA receptor antagonist, dissociative hallucinogen, and "specific plant bioactive" combination
- ALTO-202 – NR2B subunit-containing ionotropic glutamate NMDA receptor antagonist
- BrAD-R13 (R13; Braegen-01) – tropomyosin receptor kinase TrkB agonist
- Brexpiprazole (long-acting injectable; MTD-211) – atypical antipsychotic (non-selective monoamine receptor modulator)
- CRHR1 antagonist therapeutic (HMNC Brain Health) – corticotropin releasing factor receptor 1 (CRF_{1}) antagonist
- Duloxetine (oral suspension) – serotonin and norepinephrine reuptake inhibitor
- EB-003 – non-hallucinogenic serotonin receptor agonist and psychoplastogen
- EGX-A – serotonin 5-HT_{2A} receptor agonist and psychedelic hallucinogen
- EGX-B – serotonin 5-HT_{2A} receptor agonist and psychedelic hallucinogen
- ENX-104 – presynaptic dopamine D_{2} and D_{3} autoreceptor antagonist (at low doses)
- ENX-105 – dopamine D_{2} and D_{3} receptor antagonist and serotonin 5-HT_{1A} and 5-HT_{2A} receptor agonist (non-hallucinogenic)
- Estianeptine ((S)-tianeptine; TNX-4300) – peroxisome proliferator-activated receptor PPARβ/δ and PPARγ agonist
- Etifoxine deuterated (GRX-917) – GABA_{A} receptor positive allosteric modulator and translocator protein (TSPO; peripheral benzodiazepine receptor) agonist (neurosteroidogenesis stimulant)
- FMP374 (FMP-374) – ionotropic glutamate NMDA receptor antagonist
- GABA positive allosteric modulator (CS Bay Therapeutics) – GABA_{A} receptor positive allosteric modulator
- INV-88 – macrophage migration inhibitory factor (MIF) inhibitor
- ITI-333 – serotonin 5-HT_{2A} receptor antagonist, μ-opioid receptor biased partial agonist, α_{1A}-adrenergic receptor antagonist, and dopamine D_{1} receptor antagonist
- ITI-1549 – non-hallucinogenic serotonin 5-HT_{2A} receptor agonist and serotonin 5-HT_{2B} receptor antagonist
- Ketamine (depot; ALA-3000) – ionotropic glutamate NMDA receptor antagonist
- LPCN-1154 (LPCN1154; oral brexanolone) – GABA_{A} receptor positive allosteric modulator and neurosteroid
- LPH-5 – selective serotonin 5-HT_{2A} receptor partial agonist and psychedelic hallucinogen
- Lucid-PSYCH (Lucid-201) – undefined mechanism of action and psychedelic hallucinogen
- Mebufotenin (5-MeO-DMT; 5-methoxy-N,N-dimethyltryptamine; LSR-1019) – non-selective serotonin receptor agonist and psychedelic hallucinogen
- Midomafetamine (microneedle transdermal patch; 3,4-methylenedioxymethamphetamine; MDMA) – serotonin, norepinephrine, and dopamine releasing agent and weak serotonin 5-HT_{2A}, 5-HT_{2B}, and 5-HT_{2C} receptor agonist (entactogen and weak psychedelic hallucinogen)
- Nezavist (DCUK-Oet) – peripherally selective GABA_{A} receptor positive allosteric modulator (etomidate site)
- NLX-101 (F-15599) – serotonin 5-HT_{1A} receptor full agonist
- PSIL-001 (DMT analogue) – serotonin 5-HT_{1} receptor modulator (non-hallucinogenic)
- PSIL-002 (DMT analogue) – serotonin 5-HT_{1} receptor modulator (non-hallucinogenic)
- PSYLO-3001 (Psylo-3001) – non-hallucinogenic non-selective serotonin receptor agonist and psychoplastogen
- PSYLO-4001 (Psylo-4001) – non-hallucinogenic serotonin 5-HT_{2A} receptor agonist and psychoplastogen
- SNTX-2643 (SENS-01) – atypical serotonin reuptake inhibitor (SRI) (kanna-derived)
- SVN-015 – serotonin–dopamine reuptake inhibitor
- SYT-510 – endocannabinoid reuptake inhibitor
- TF-0066 – undefined mechanism of action

=== Research ===
- BHV-5000 – low-trapping ionotropic glutamate NMDA receptor antagonist
- NP-10679 – NR2B subunit-containing ionotropic glutamate NMDA receptor negative allosteric modulator
- Psilocybin (MYCO-001; MYCO-003) – non-selective serotonin receptor agonist and psychedelic hallucinogen
- PSYLO-5001 (Psylo-5001) – non-hallucinogenic serotonin 5-HT_{2A} receptor agonist and psychoplastogen
- Small molecule therapeutic - Rugen Therapeutics – undefined mechanism of action

=== Phase unknown ===
- Amuxetine – serotonin, norepinephrine, and dopamine reuptake inhibitor
- EDG-005 – undefined mechanism of action
- EDG-006 – undefined mechanism of action
- Iloperidone (Fanapt; Fanaptum; Fiapta; HP-873; ILO-522; VYV-683; Zomaril) – atypical antipsychotic (non-selective monoamine receptor modulator)
- INV-407 – undefined mechanism of action
- Ketamine (intravenous/oral; Braxia) – ionotropic glutamate NMDA receptor antagonist
- SK-2110 (buprenorphine implant) – μ-opioid receptor partial agonist, κ-opioid receptor antagonist, and δ-opioid receptor antagonist – under development in China

== Not under development ==
=== Development suspended ===
- BVF-045 (bupropion/undisclosed serotonin reuptake inhibitor) – norepinephrine and dopamine reuptake inhibitor, nicotinic acetylcholine receptor negative allosteric modulator, and serotonin reuptake inhibitor combination
- Dexmedetomidine (BXCL-501; Igalmi; KalmPen) – α_{2}-adrenergic receptor agonist
- ETX-155 – GABA_{A} receptor positive allosteric modulator and neurosteroid
- Ganaxolone (CCD-1042; Ztalmy) – GABA_{A} receptor positive allosteric modulator and neurosteroid

=== No development reported ===
- AAG-561 – corticotropin releasing hormone (CRH) inhibitor
- Adinazolam (Deracyn; U-41123; U-41123F) – GABA_{A} receptor positive allosteric modulator and benzodiazepine
- Amitifadine (DOV-21947; EB-1010) – serotonin, norepinephrine, and dopamine reuptake inhibitor
- AN-788 (NSD-788) – serotonin and dopamine reuptake inhibitor
- ANAVEX 1-41 (blarcamesine analogue) – sigma σ_{1} receptor agonist, muscarinic acetylcholine receptor modulator, and sodium and chloride channel modulator
- Aripiprazole (transdermal; AQS-1301) – atypical antipsychotic (non-selective monoamine receptor modulator)
- Arketamine (HR-071603; (R)-ketamine nasal spray) – ionotropic glutamate NMDA receptor antagonist
- AZD-8108 – ionotropic glutamate NMDA receptor antagonist
- BCI-632 – metabotropic glutamate mGlu_{2} and mGlu_{3} receptor antagonist
- BCI-838 – metabotropic glutamate mGlu_{2} and mGlu_{3} receptor antagonist
- BMS-866949 (CSTI-500) – serotonin, norepinephrine, and dopamine reuptake inhibitor
- Bryostatin 1 (MW-904) – protein kinase C (PKC) stimulant
- BTRX-246040 (LY-2940094) – nociceptin receptor antagonist
- Buprenorphine/samidorphan (ALKS-5461) – μ-opioid receptor partial agonist, κ-opioid receptor antagonist, δ-opioid receptor antagonist, and μ-opioid receptor antagonist combination
- Bupropion/naltrexone (Contrave) – norepinephrine and dopamine reuptake inhibitor, nicotinic acetylcholine receptor negative allosteric modulator, and μ-opioid receptor antagonist combination
- Cericlamine (JO-1017) – serotonin reuptake inhibitor
- Citalopram/pipamperone (PipCit; PNB-01) – serotonin reuptake inhibitor and typical antipsychotic combination
- Depression therapy - Genopia Biomedical – undefined mechanism of action
- (R)-Desmethylsibutramine ((+)-desmethylsibutramine; or (R)-desmethylsibutramine/(+)-didesmethylsibutramine) – serotonin, norepinephrine, and dopamine reuptake inhibitor
- Deulumateperone (ITI-1284; lumateperone deuterated) – atypical antipsychotic (non-selective monoamine receptor modulator)
- Dipraglurant (ADX-48621; mGluR5-NAM) – metabotropic glutamate mGlu_{5} receptor negative allosteric modulator
- Erteberel (LY-500307; SERBA-1) – estrogen receptor β (ERβ) agonist
- Esketamine (esketamine DPI; Falkieri; PG061; S-ketamine) – ionotropic glutamate NMDA receptor antagonist
- Eszopiclone (Lunesta) – GABA_{A} receptor positive allosteric modulator and Z-drug
- EVT-101 (ENS-101) – NR2B subunit-containing ionotropic glutamate NMDA receptor negative allosteric modulator
- Fananserin (RP-62203) – serotonin 5-HT_{2A} receptor antagonist and dopamine D_{4} receptor antagonist
- Fibroblast growth factor 1 (FGF-1) – fibroblast growth factor receptor (FGFR) agonist
- Filorexant (MK-6096) – orexin OX_{1} and OX_{2} receptor antagonist
- GEA-857 (alaproclate analogue) – potassium conductance putative blocker
- GSK-588045 – serotonin 5-HT_{1A}, 5-HT_{1B}, and 5-HT_{1D} receptor antagonist
- GSK-1360707 – serotonin, norepinephrine, and dopamine reuptake inhibitor
- HS-10353 – GABA_{A} receptor positive allosteric modulator
- Hypidone – serotonin reuptake inhibitor and serotonin 5-HT_{1A} and 5-HT_{6} receptor agonist
- Igmesine (CI-1019; JO-1784) – sigma σ_{1} receptor agonist
- Imiloxan (RS-21361) – α_{2}-adrenergic receptor antagonist
- IN-ASTR-001 – undefined mechanism of action
- Ketamine (transdermal patch; SHX-001) – ionotropic glutamate NMDA receptor antagonist
- Ketamine (sublingual; ketamine wafer; SLS-003; Wafermine) – ionotropic glutamate NMDA receptor antagonist
- KFM-19 – adenosine A_{1} receptor antagonist
- LSM-6 (3-hydroxy-N,N-dimethylphenethylamine) – undefined mechanism of action (adrenergic and serotonergic agent; constituent of Limacia scanden Lour.) – was under development in Malaysia
- Midomafetamine (3,4-methylenedioxymethamphetamine; MDMA; ecstasy) – serotonin, norepinephrine, and dopamine releasing agent and weak serotonin 5-HT_{2A}, 5-HT_{2B}, and 5-HT_{2C} receptor agonist (entactogen and weak psychedelic hallucinogen)
- Mitizodone (HEC-113995) – serotonin reuptake inhibitor and serotonin 5-HT_{1A} and 5-HT_{1B} receptor partial agonist
- Nivacortol (nivazole; NEBO-174; novozola) – glucocorticoid receptor antagonist
- Omiloxetine – serotonin reuptake inhibitor
- Oxitriptan (5-hydroxytryptophan; 5-HTP; EVX-301) – serotonin precursor
- Pseudohypericin – undefined mechanism of action (constituent of St John's wort)
- Psilocybin (CYB-001; INT0052/2020) – non-selective serotonin receptor agonist and psychedelic hallucinogen
- Psilocybin (biosynthetic psilocybin; PB-1818) – non-selective serotonin receptor agonist and psychedelic hallucinogen
- QRX-002 – ionotropic glutamate NMDA receptor antagonist
- RG-7351 – trace amine-associated receptor 1 (TAAR1) agonist
- Riluzole (sublingual; BHV-0223; Nurtec) – complex mechanism of action or glutamatergic modulator
- Risperidone (Risperdal) – atypical antipsychotic (non-selective monoamine receptor modulator)
- SAR-102779 (SAR-10279) – neurokinin NK_{2} receptor antagonist
- SD-254 (deuterated venlafaxine) – serotonin and norepinephrine reuptake inhibitor
- SEP-378614 – undefined mechanism of action
- SNA-1 – undefined mechanism of action
- Soclenicant (BNC-210; IW-2143) – α_{7} nicotinic acetylcholine receptor negative allosteric modulator
- SPL-801-B ((2R,6R)-hydroxynorketamine; 6-HNK) – non-hallucinogenic ketamine derivative/metabolite
- TrkB receptor antagonist (Celon Pharma) – tropomyosin receptor kinase TrkB antagonist
- YDP-2225 – undefined mechanism of action

=== Development discontinued ===
- ABT-436 – vasopressin V_{1b} receptor antagonist
- Adatanserin (WAY-SEB-324; WY-50324; SEB-324) – serotonin 5-HT_{1A} receptor partial agonist and serotonin 5-HT_{2A} and 5-HT_{2C} receptor antagonist
- ADX-71149 (JNJ-1813; JNJ-40411813; JNJ-mGluR2-PAM) – metabotropic glutamate mGlu_{2} receptor modulator
- Amesergide (LY-237733) – serotonin 5-HT_{2A}, 5-HT_{2B}, and 5-HT_{2C} receptor antagonist, α_{2}-adrenergic receptor antagonist, and other actions
- Amibegron (SR-58611; SR-58611A) – β_{3}-adrenergic receptor agonist
- Aprepitant (MK-869) – neurokinin NK_{1} receptor antagonist
- ARA-014418 (AR-A014418; GSK-3β Inhibitor VIII) – glycogen synthase kinase GSK-3β inhibitor
- Armodafinil (CEP-10953; Nuvigil; (R)-modafinil) – atypical dopamine reuptake inhibitor
- Aticaprant (AVTX-501; CERC-501; JNJ-3964; JNJ-67953964; LY-2456302) – κ-opioid receptor antagonist
- Atipamezole (antisedan; MPV-1248) – α_{2}-adrenergic receptor antagonist
- Atomoxetine (LY-139603; Strattera; Tomoxetine) – norepinephrine reuptake inhibitor
- AZD-2066 – metabotropic glutamate mGlu_{5} receptor antagonist
- AZD-2327 – δ-opioid receptor agonist
- AZD-7268 – δ-opioid receptor agonist
- AZD-8129 (AR-A000002; AR-A2XX; AR-A2) – serotonin 5-HT_{1B} receptor antagonist
- Basimglurant (NOE-101; RG-7090; RO-4917523) – metabotropic glutamate mGlu_{5} receptor antagonist
- Befloxatone (MD-370503) – monoamine oxidase MAO-A reversible inhibitor
- BMS-181101 (BMY-42569) – serotonin reuptake inhibitor and serotonin 5-HT_{1A} and 5-HT_{1D} receptor agonist
- Buspirone (transdermal; BuSpar Patch) – serotonin 5-HT_{1A} receptor partial agonist
- Casopitant (GW-679769; GW679769) – neurokinin NK_{1} receptor antagonist
- Centpropazine – unknown mechanism of action
- Cibinetide (ARA-290) – erythropoietin receptor (EpoR) agonist
- Citalopram (controlled-release) – serotonin reuptake inhibitor
- Clavulanic acid (RX-10100; Serdaxin; Zoraxel) – β-lactamase inhibitor and unknown mechanism of action (glutamate transporter GLT1 expression enhancer, dopamine, glutamate, and serotonin modulator, possibly via Munc18-1 and Rab4 interactions)
- Clovoxamine (DU-23811) – serotonin and norepinephrine reuptake inhibitor
- Coluracetam (BCI-540; MKC-231) – ionotropic glutamate AMPA receptor positive allosteric modulator, choline uptake and acetylcholine synthesis enhancer, and racetam
- CP-316311 – corticotropin releasing hormone (CRH) inhibitor
- Crinecerfont (NBI-74788; SSR-125543; SSR-125543A) – corticotropin releasing factor receptor 1 (CRF_{1}) antagonist
- CRL-41789 – undefined mechanism of action
- Cutamesine (AGY-94806; Msc-1; SA-4503) – sigma σ_{1} receptor agonist
- CX157 (KP157; TriRima; Tyrima) – monoamine oxidase MAO-A reversible inhibitor
- Dapoxetine (LY-210448; Priligy) – serotonin reuptake inhibitor
- Dasotraline (DSP-225289; SEP-225289; SEP-0225289; SEP-289) – serotonin, norepinephrine, and dopamine reuptake inhibitor
- DDP-225 – norepinephrine reuptake inhibitor and serotonin 5-HT_{3} receptor antagonist
- Decoglurant – metabotropic glutamate mGlu_{2} and mGlu_{3} receptor antagonist
- Delequamine (RS-15385; RS-15385197) – α_{2}-adrenergic receptor antagonist
- Delucemine (NPS-1506) – ionotropic glutamate NMDA receptor polyamine site antagonist and serotonin reuptake inhibitor
- Dexmecamylamine (AT-5214; NIH-11008; S-mecamylamine; TC-5214) – α_{3}β_{4} and α_{4}β_{2} nicotinic acetylcholine receptor negative allosteric modulator
- Dexnafenodone (LU-43706) – serotonin and norepinephrine reuptake inhibitor
- DMP-695 – corticotropin releasing hormone (CRH) inhibitor
- DOV-216303 – serotonin, norepinephrine, and dopamine reuptake inhibitor
- DPC-368 – undefined mechanism of action
- DSP-1200 – serotonin 5-HT_{2A} receptor antagonist, dopamine D_{2} receptor antagonist, and α_{2A}-adrenergic receptor antagonist
- Edivoxetine (EDP-125; LY-2216684) – norepinephrine reuptake inhibitor
- Elzasonan (CP-448187) – serotonin 5-HT_{1B} and 5-HT_{1D} receptor antagonist
- Emapunil (AC-5216; XBD-173) – translocator protein (TSPO; peripheral benzodiazepine receptor) agonist (neurosteroidogenesis stimulant)
- Emicerfont (GW-876008; GW-876008X) – corticotropin releasing factor receptor 1 (CRF_{1}) antagonist
- Eplivanserin (Ciltyri; Sliwens; SR-46349; SR-46349B; SR-46615A) – serotonin 5-HT_{2A} receptor antagonist
- Eptapirone (F-11440) – serotonin 5-HT_{1A} receptor full agonist
- Esreboxetine ((S,S)-Reboxetine; AXS-14; PNU-165442G) – norepinephrine reuptake inhibitor
- Esuprone (LU-43839) – monoamine oxidase MAO-A reversible inhibitor
- Ethyl eicosapentaenoic acid (Ethyl-EPA) – omega-3 fatty acid
- F-14258 – serotonin 5-HT_{1B} and 5-HT_{1D} receptor antagonist
- Farampator (CX-691; ORG-24448) – ionotropic glutamate AMPA receptor positive allosteric modulator
- Fasoracetam (AEVI-001; LAM-105; MDGN-001; NFC-1; NS-105) – unknown mechanism of action (metabotropic glutamate receptor modulator) and racetam
- FCE-25876 – serotonin reuptake inhibitor
- Flerobuterol (CRL-40827) – β-adrenergic receptor agonist
- Flesinoxan (DU-29373) – serotonin 5-HT_{1A} receptor agonist
- Flibanserin (Addyi; BIMT-17; Girosa) – serotonin 5-HT_{1A} receptor agonist, serotonin 5-HT_{2A}, 5-HT_{2B}, and 5-HT_{2C} receptor antagonist, and dopamine D_{4} receptor antagonist
- (R)-Fluoxetine – serotonin reuptake inhibitor
- Fluparoxan (GR-50360; GR-50360A) – α_{2}-adrenergic receptor antagonist
- Gaboxadol (LU-02030; LU-2-030; MK-0928; OV-101; THIP) – GABA_{A} receptor agonist
- Girisopam (EGIS-5810; GYKI-51189) – GABA_{A} receptor positive allosteric modulator and benzodiazepine
- GYKI-52895 – dopamine reuptake inhibitor
- Haloperidol (CLR-3001) – typical antipsychotic (non-selective monoamine receptor modulator; low-dose withdrawal therapy)
- HT-2157 (SNAP-37889) – galanin GAL_{3} receptor antagonist
- ICI-170809 (ZM-170809) – serotonin 5-HT_{2} receptor antagonist
- Idazoxan – α_{2}-adrenergic receptor antagonist
- Ipsapirone (BAY-Q-7821; TVX-Q-7821) – serotonin 5-HT_{1A} receptor partial agonist
- IRFI-165 – adenosine A_{1} receptor antagonist
- Istradefylline (KW-6002; Nourianz; Nouriast) – adenosine A_{2} receptor antagonist
- JNJ-18038683 – serotonin 5-HT_{7} receptor antagonist
- JNJ-19567470 (CRA-5626; R-317573) – corticotropin releasing factor receptor 1 (CRF_{1}) antagonist
- JNJ-26489112 – unknown mechanism of action (topiramate successor)
- JNJ-39393406 – α_{7} nicotinic acetylcholine receptor positive allosteric modulator
- Lanicemine (AZD-6765) – low-trapping ionotropic glutamate NMDA receptor antagonist
- LB-100 (LB-1) – protein phosphatase 2A (PP2A) inhibitor
- Levoprotiline (CGP-12103; CGP-12103A; CGS-12103; R(–)-oxaprotiline; R(–)-hydroxymaprotiline) – histamine H_{1} receptor antagonist, other actions, and tetracyclic antidepressant
- Lithium – unknown mechanism of action and mood stabilizer
- Litoxetine (IXA-001; SL-810385) – serotonin reuptake inhibitor and weak serotonin 5-HT_{3} receptor antagonist
- Losmapimod (FTX-1821; GS-856553; GSK-856553; GW-856553; GW-856553X) – p38-α/β mitogen-activated protein kinase (MAPK) inhibitor and double homeobox 4 (DUX4) inhibitor
- LU-AA34893 (LU-AA-34893) – serotonin receptor modulator
- LU-AA39959 (LU-AA-39959) – ion channel modulator
- Lubazodone (SM-50C; YM-35992; YM-992) – serotonin reuptake inhibitor and serotonin 5-HT_{2A} receptor antagonist
- Masitinib (AB-07105; AB-1010; Alsitek; Masican; Masipro; Masiviera) – tyrosine kinase inhibitor and other actions
- Mecamylamine (Inversine; Tridmac) – nicotinic acetylcholine receptor negative allosteric modulator
- MIN-117 (WF-516) – serotonin and dopamine reuptake inhibitor, serotonin 5-HT_{1A} and 5-HT_{7} receptor antagonist, and α_{1}-adrenergic receptor antagonist
- MK-1942 – undefined mechanism of action
- ML-105 – undefined mechanism of action
- Naloxone/tianeptine (TNX-601; TNX-601-CR; TNX-601-ER) – weak and atypical μ- and δ-opioid receptor agonist, other actions, tricyclic antidepressant, and μ-opioid receptor antagonist combination
- Naluzotan (PRX-00023) – serotonin 5-HT_{1A} receptor partial agonist and sigma σ_{1} receptor antagonist
- Neboglamine (nebostinel; CR-2249; XY-2401) – ionotropic glutamate NMDA receptor glycine site positive allosteric modulator
- Nefiracetam (BRN 6848330; CCRIS 6729; DM 9384; DMPPA; DN-9384; DZL-221; HL-0812; HPI-001; Motiva; Translon) – unknown mechanism of action (voltage-gated calcium channel potentiator, α_{4}β_{2} nicotinic acetylcholine receptor potentiator, ionotropic glutamate NMDA receptor potentiator (possible glycine site partial positive allosteric modulator), ionotropic glutamate AMPA receptor potentiator, and GABA_{A} receptor agonist) and racetam
- Nelivaptan (NB-415) – vasopressin V_{1b} receptor antagonist
- Nemifitide (INN-00835) – unknown mechanism of action
- NS-2359 (GSK-372475) – serotonin, norepinephrine, and dopamine reuptake inhibitor
- NS-2389 (GW-650250; GW-650250A) – serotonin, norepinephrine, and dopamine reuptake inhibitor
- ORG-37684 – serotonin 5-HT_{2A}, 5-HT_{2B}, and 5-HT_{2C} receptor agonist
- ORM-10921 – α_{2C}-adrenergic receptor antagonist
- Orvepitant (GW-823296; GW-823296X; GW823296) – neurokinin NK_{1} receptor antagonist
- Osanetant (ACER-801; SR-142801; SR-142806) – neurokinin NK_{3} receptor antagonist
- Pexacerfont (BMS-562086) – corticotropin releasing factor receptor 1 (CRF_{1}) antagonist
- PF-04455242 – κ-opioid receptor antagonist
- PT-150 (ORG-34517; SCH-900636) – glucocorticoid receptor antagonist and androgen receptor antagonist
- Radafaxine (GW-353162; (2S,3S)-hydroxybupropion) – norepinephrine and dopamine reuptake inhibitor
- Ramelteon (Rozerem; TAK-375) – melatonin MT_{1} and MT_{2} receptor agonist
- Rapastinel (BV-102; GLYX-13; TPPT-amide) – ionotropic glutamate NMDA receptor glycine site partial agonist
- RG-7166 – serotonin, norepinephrine, and dopamine reuptake inhibitor
- Ritanserin (R-55667) – serotonin 5-HT_{2A} and 5-HT_{2C} receptor antagonist
- Robalzotan (AZD-7371; NAD-299) – serotonin 5-HT_{1A} receptor antagonist
- Rolipram (ME-3167; ZK-62711) – phosphodiesterase 4 (PDE4) inhibitor
- Sabcomeline (BCI-224; CEB-242; Memric; SB-202026) – muscarinic acetylcholine M_{1} receptor agonist
- Saredutant (SR-48968) – neurokinin NK_{2} receptor antagonist
- SB-236057 – serotonin 5-HT_{1B} receptor inverse agonist
- SB-245570 – serotonin 5-HT_{1B} receptor antagonist
- SB-247853 – serotonin 5-HT_{2C} receptor inverse agonist
- Sibutramine (Aoquqing; BTS-54524; Ectiva; KES-524; Meridia; Reductase; Reductil; Reduxade; Sibutral) – serotonin, norepinephrine, and dopamine reuptake inhibitor
- Siramesine (LU-28179) – sigma σ_{2} receptor agonist
- Sirukumab (CNTO-136; Plivensia) – interleukin 6 (IL-6) inhibitor
- SKL-10406 (SKL-DEP) – serotonin, norepinephrine, and dopamine reuptake inhibitor
- SKL-PSY (FZ-016) – serotonin 5-HT_{1A} receptor agonist
- Sodium phenylbutyrate (slow-release; LU-901; Lunaphen) – histone deacetylase (HDAC) inhibitor
- SSR-241586 – neurokinin NK_{2} and NK_{3} receptor antagonist
- Tandospirone (metanopirone; Sediel; SM-3997) – serotonin 5-HT_{1A} receptor partial agonist and α_{2}-adrenergic receptor antagonist
- Tasimelteon (BMS-214778; Hetlioz; VEC-162) – melatonin MT_{1} and MT_{2} receptor agonist
- Tedatioxetine (LU-AA24530) – serotonin, norepinephrine, and dopamine reuptake inhibitor, serotonin 5-HT_{2A}, 5-HT_{2C}, and 5-HT_{3} receptor antagonist, and α_{1A}-adrenergic receptor antagonist
- Tianeptine (JNJ-39823277; TPI-1062) – weak and atypical μ- and δ-opioid receptor agonist, other actions, and tricyclic antidepressant
- TS-111 – undefined mechanism of action
- Tulrampator (CX-1632; S-47445) – ionotropic glutamate AMPA receptor positive allosteric modulator
- Vanoxerine (boxeprazine; GBR-12909) – atypical dopamine reuptake inhibitor
- Verucerfont (GSK-561679; NBI-77860) – corticotropin releasing factor receptor 1 (CRF_{1}) antagonist
- Vestipitant (GW-597599; GW-597599B) – neurokinin NK_{1} receptor antagonist
- Viloxazine (Qelbree) – norepinephrine reuptake inhibitor
- VN-2222 – serotonin reuptake inhibitor and serotonin 5-HT_{1A} receptor partial agonist
- VUFB-17649 – serotonin reuptake inhibitor
- VUFB-18285 – serotonin reuptake inhibitor
- ZD-4974 – neurokinin NK_{1} receptor antagonist
- Zelatriazin (TAK-041; NBI-1065846; NBI-846) – G protein-coupled receptor 139 (GPR139) agonist
- Ziprasidone (Geodon) – atypical antipsychotic (non-selective monoamine receptor modulator)

=== Preregistration submission withdrawal ===
- Aripiprazole/sertraline (ASC-01) – atypical antipsychotic (non-selective monoamine receptor modulator) and serotonin reuptake inhibitor combination

=== Formal development never or not yet started ===
- Mevidalen (LY-3154207; D1 PAM) – dopamine D_{1} receptor positive allosteric modulator – under development for Lewy body disease
- Nitrous oxide (N_{2}O; "laughing gas") – ionotropic glutamate NMDA receptor antagonist – being studied for depression but doesn't seem to be being formally developed towards approval

== Clinically used drugs ==
=== Approved drugs ===
- Agomelatine (Valdoxan) – serotonin 5-HT_{2C} receptor antagonist and melatonin MT_{1} and MT_{2} receptor agonist
- Amineptine (Survector, Maneon) – norepinephrine and dopamine reuptake inhibitor – withdrawn
- Amisulpride (Solian) – atypical antipsychotic (dopamine D_{2} and D_{3} receptor antagonist and serotonin 5-HT_{2B} and 5-HT_{7} receptor antagonist)
- Amitriptyline (Elavil) – tricyclic antidepressant (non-selective monoamine reuptake inhibitor and/or receptor modulator)
- Amoxapine (Asendin) – tetracyclic antidepressant (non-selective monoamine reuptake inhibitor and/or receptor modulator)
- Aripiprazole (Abilify) – atypical antipsychotic (non-selective monoamine receptor modulator)
- Brexanolone (allopregnanolone; SAGE-547; SGE-102; Zulresso) – GABA_{A} receptor positive allosteric modulator and neurosteroid – approved for postpartum depression
- Brexpiprazole (Rexulti) – atypical antipsychotic (non-selective monoamine receptor modulator)
- Bupropion (Wellbutrin) – norepinephrine and dopamine reuptake inhibitor and nicotinic acetylcholine receptor negative allosteric modulator
- Bupropion/dextromethorphan (Auvelity) – sigma σ_{1} receptor agonist, serotonin reuptake inhibitor, norepinephrine and dopamine reuptake inhibitor, nicotinic acetylcholine receptor negative allosteric modulator, ionotropic glutamate NMDA receptor antagonist, other actions, and CYP2D6 inhibitor combination
- Butriptyline (Evadyne) – tricyclic antidepressant (non-selective monoamine reuptake inhibitor and/or receptor modulator) – discontinued
- Cariprazine (Vraylar) – atypical antipsychotic (non-selective monoamine receptor modulator)
- Citalopram (Celexa) – serotonin reuptake inhibitor
- Desipramine (Norpramin) – tricyclic antidepressant (non-selective monoamine reuptake inhibitor and/or receptor modulator)
- Desvenlafaxine (Pristiq) – serotonin and norepinephrine reuptake inhibitor
- Desvenlafaxine (extended-release; Khedezla) – serotonin and norepinephrine reuptake inhibitor – withdrawn
- Desvenlafaxine (extended-release; WIP-DF17) – serotonin and norepinephrine reuptake inhibitor – registered in South Korea
- Dosulepin (dothiepin; Prothiaden) – tricyclic antidepressant (non-selective monoamine reuptake inhibitor and/or receptor modulator)
- Doxepin (Sinequan) – tricyclic antidepressant (non-selective monoamine reuptake inhibitor and/or receptor modulator)
- Duloxetine (Cymbalta; Drizalma Sprinkle) – serotonin and norepinephrine reuptake inhibitor
- Escitalopram (Lexapro) – serotonin reuptake inhibitor
- Esketamine (Spravato) – ionotropic glutamate NMDA receptor antagonist
- Fluoxetine (Prozac; Sarafem) – serotonin reuptake inhibitor
- Fluvoxamine (Luvox) – serotonin reuptake inhibitor
- Gepirone (Exxua) – serotonin 5-HT_{1A} receptor partial agonist and α_{2}-adrenergic receptor antagonist
- Hypericum extract (LI-160; St John's wort) – undefined mechanism of action
- Imipramine (Tofranil) – tricyclic antidepressant (non-selective monoamine reuptake inhibitor and/or receptor modulator)
- Iproniazid (Marsilid) – monoamine oxidase MAO-A and MAO-B irreversible inhibitor – withdrawn
- Isocarboxazid (Marplan) – monoamine oxidase MAO-A and MAO-B irreversible inhibitor
- Levomilnacipran (Fetzima) – serotonin and norepinephrine reuptake inhibitor
- Levosulpiride (L-sulpiride; Levobren; Levopraid; Levosulpride; RV-12309; Sulpepta) – dopamine D_{2} and D_{3} receptor antagonist and serotonin 5-HT_{4} receptor agonist
- Lofepramine (Lomont) – tricyclic antidepressant (non-selective monoamine reuptake inhibitor and/or receptor modulator)
- Lumateperone (Caplyta) – atypical antipsychotic (non-selective monoamine receptor modulator)
- Lurasidone (Latuda) – atypical antipsychotic (non-selective monoamine receptor modulator)
- Maprotiline (Ludiomil) – tetracyclic antidepressant (non-selective monoamine reuptake inhibitor and/or receptor modulator)
- Mianserin (Tolvon) – tetracyclic antidepressant (non-selective monoamine reuptake inhibitor and/or receptor modulator)
- Milnacipran (Dalcipran; Ixel; Savella) – serotonin and norepinephrine reuptake inhibitor
- Mirtazapine (Remeron) – α_{2}-adrenergic receptor antagonist, serotonin 5-HT_{2A}, 5-HT_{2C}, and 5-HT_{3} receptor antagonist, histamine H_{1} receptor inverse agonist, and tetracyclic antidepressant
- Moclobemide (Aurorix; Manerix) – monoamine oxidase MAO-A reversible inhibitor
- Nefazodone (BMY-13754; Dutonin; MJ-13754; MS-13754; Nefadar; Serzone) – serotonin 5-HT_{1A} receptor ligand, serotonin 5-HT_{2A} and 5-HT_{2C} receptor antagonist, α_{1}- and α_{2}-adrenergic receptor antagonist, weak serotonin, norepinephrine, and dopamine reuptake inhibitor, and other actions – mostly withdrawn
- Nomifensine (Merital; Alival) – norepinephrine and dopamine reuptake inhibitor – withdrawn
- Nortriptyline (Aventyl) – tricyclic antidepressant (non-selective monoamine reuptake inhibitor and/or receptor modulator)
- Olanzapine (Zyprexa) – atypical antipsychotic (non-selective monoamine receptor modulator)
- Olanzapine/fluoxetine (OFC; Symbyax; ZypZac) – atypical antipsychotic (non-selective monoamine receptor modulator) and serotonin reuptake inhibitor combination
- Opipramol (Ensidon; G-33040; Insidon; Nisidana) – sigma σ_{1} and σ_{2} receptor agonist, serotonin 5-HT_{2A} receptor antagonist, dopamine D_{2} receptor antagonist, α_{1}-adrenergic receptor antagonist, histamine H_{1} receptor antagonist, other actions, and tricyclic antidepressant
- Paroxetine (Paxil; Seroxat) – serotonin reuptake inhibitor
- Phenelzine (Nardil) – monoamine oxidase MAO-A and MAO-B irreversible inhibitor
- Protriptyline (Vivactil) – tricyclic antidepressant (non-selective monoamine reuptake inhibitor and/or receptor modulator)
- Quetiapine (Seroquel) – atypical antipsychotic (non-selective monoamine receptor modulator)
- Reboxetine (Edronax) – norepinephrine reuptake inhibitor
- Selegiline (Emsam) – monoamine oxidase MAO-B irreversible inhibitor, catecholaminergic activity enhancer, and weak norepineprhine releasing agent (via metabolites)
- Sertraline (Zoloft; Lustral) – serotonin reuptake inhibitor
- Setiptiline (Tecipul; Tesolon) – serotonin receptor antagonist, α_{2}-adrenergic receptor antagonist, norepinephrine reuptake inhibitor, and tetracyclic antidepressant
- Tianeptine (Coaxil; Stablon; Tatinol) – weak and atypical μ- and δ-opioid receptor agonist, other actions, and tricyclic antidepressant
- Toludesvenlafaxine (ansofaxine; 4-methylbenzoate desvenlafaxine; desvenlafaxine prodrug; LPM-570065; LY-03005; Ruoxinlin) – serotonin, norepinephrine, and dopamine reuptake inhibitor
- Tranylcypromine (Parnate) – monoamine oxidase MAO-A and MAO-B irreversible inhibitor
- Trazodone (Oleptro; Trittico) – serotonin 5-HT_{1A} receptor partial agonist, serotonin 5-HT_{2A} and 5-HT_{2C} receptor antagonist, α_{1}- and α_{2}-adrenergic receptor antagonist, weak serotonin reuptake inhibitor, and other actions
- Trimipramine (Surmontil) – tricyclic antidepressant (non-selective monoamine reuptake inhibitor and/or receptor modulator)
- Venlafaxine (Effexor) – serotonin and norepinephrine reuptake inhibitor
- Vilazodone (Viibryd) – serotonin reuptake inhibitor and serotonin 5-HT_{1A} receptor agonist
- Viloxazine (Vivalan) – norepinephrine reuptake inhibitor
- Vortioxetine (Trintellix) – serotonin reuptake inhibitor, serotonin 5-HT_{1A} and 5-HT_{1B} receptor agonist, and serotonin 5-HT_{1D}, 5-HT_{3}, and 5-HT_{7} receptor antagonist
- Zimelidine (Zelmid) – serotonin reuptake inhibitor – withdrawn
- Zuranolone (BIIB-125; S-812217; SAGE-217; SGE-797; Zurzuvae) – GABA_{A} receptor positive allosteric modulator and neurosteroid – approved for postpartum depression

== See also ==
- List of investigational drugs
- List of antidepressants
- List of investigational bipolar disorder drugs
