= RG7713 =

Vasopressin V1A receptor antagonist

Clinical data
- Other names: RG-7713; RO5028442; RO-5028442; Ro 5028442
- Routes of administration: Intravenous injection
- Drug class: Vasopression V_{A} receptor antagonist

Identifiers
- IUPAC name: [6-chloro-1-[2-(dimethylamino)ethyl]indol-3-yl]-spiro[1H-2-benzofuran-3,4'-piperidine]-1'-ylmethanone
- CAS Number: 920022-47-5
- PubChem CID: 59657596
- DrugBank: DB12721
- ChemSpider: 52084863
- UNII: LZ0EU1YHCK
- ChEMBL: ChEMBL3416885

Chemical and physical data
- Formula: C_{25}H_{28}ClN_{3}O_{2}
- Molar mass: 437.97 g·mol^{−1}
- 3D model (JSmol): Interactive image
- SMILES: CN(C)CCN1C=C(C2=C1C=C(C=C2)Cl)C(=O)N3CCC4(CC3)C5=CC=CC=C5CO4
- InChI: InChI=1S/C25H28ClN3O2/c1-27(2)13-14-29-16-21(20-8-7-19(26)15-23(20)29)24(30)28-11-9-25(10-12-28)22-6-4-3-5-18(22)17-31-25/h3-8,15-16H,9-14,17H2,1-2H3; Key:QZXVLRCMAHJVIP-UHFFFAOYSA-N

RG7713, or RG-7713, also known as RO5028442, is a small-molecule vasopression V_{1A} receptor antagonist which is or was under development for the treatment of pervasive developmental disorders or autism. It is administered by intravenous injection.

The drug is centrally penetrant and is devoid of antagonism of the vasopressin V_{2} and oxytocin receptors. Clinical studies found induction of subtle improvements but also subtle deficits in social communication surrogates with RG7713 in adult men with high-functioning autism. A 2024 meta-analysis of vasopressin V_{1A} receptor antagonists including RG7713 for autism found that they may not be effective in the treatment of the core symptoms of autism.

As of December 2018, no recent development has been reported. It reached phase 1 clinical trials. Balovaptan (RG7314) has been described as a follow-up compound of RG7713 and reached later-stage clinical trials but was found to be ineffective.

== See also ==
- ABT-436
- Brezivaptan
- LIT-001
- Nelivaptan
- SSR-149415
- SRX246
