= SVN-015 =

Clinical data
- Other names: SVN015
- Routes of administration: Unspecified
- Drug class: Serotonin–dopamine reuptake inhibitor (SDRI)

SVN-015 is a serotonin–dopamine reuptake inhibitor (SDRI) which is under development for the treatment of major depressive disorder (MDD) and substance-related disorders such as stimulant use disorder. It produces antidepressant-like effects in rodents similarly to the selective serotonin reuptake inhibitor (SSRI) fluoxetine. SVN-015 is being developed by Solvonis Therapeutics, whose chief scientific officer (CSO) is David Nutt, in collaboration with the National Institute on Drug Abuse (NIDA). As of August 2026, the drug is in the preclinical research stage of development for all indications. The chemical structure of SVN-015 does not yet appear to have been disclosed. However, Solvonis Therapeutics has patented monoamine transporter modulators.

== See also ==
- List of investigational antidepressants
- List of investigational substance-related disorder drugs
- AN-788, MIN-117, and UWA-101
