= SRX251 =

Clinical data
- Other names: SRX-251; API-251; API251
- Routes of administration: Oral
- Drug class: Vasopressin V_{1A} receptor antagonist

Identifiers
- IUPAC name: (2R)-N-methyl-4-oxo-2-[(3S,4R)-2-oxo-3-[(4S)-2-oxo-4-phenyl-1,3-oxazolidin-3-yl]-4-[(E)-2-phenylethenyl]azetidin-1-yl]-4-(4-piperidin-1-ylpiperidin-1-yl)-N-[[3-(trifluoromethyl)phenyl]methyl]butanamide
- CAS Number: 512784-94-0
- PubChem CID: 11686429
- ChemSpider: 9861157
- UNII: G9Z22EU5FK
- ChEMBL: ChEMBL279328

Chemical and physical data
- Formula: C_{43}H_{48}F_{3}N_{5}O_{5}
- Molar mass: 771.882 g·mol^{−1}
- 3D model (JSmol): Interactive image
- SMILES: CN(CC1=CC(=CC=C1)C(F)(F)F)C(=O)[C@@H](CC(=O)N2CCC(CC2)N3CCCCC3)N4[C@@H]([C@@H](C4=O)N5[C@H](COC5=O)C6=CC=CC=C6)/C=C/C7=CC=CC=C7
- InChI: InChI=1S/C43H48F3N5O5/c1-47(28-31-14-11-17-33(26-31)43(44,45)46)40(53)36(27-38(52)49-24-20-34(21-25-49)48-22-9-4-10-23-48)50-35(19-18-30-12-5-2-6-13-30)39(41(50)54)51-37(29-56-42(51)55)32-15-7-3-8-16-32/h2-3,5-8,11-19,26,34-37,39H,4,9-10,20-25,27-29H2,1H3/b19-18+/t35-,36-,37-,39+/m1/s1; Key:GOQPVIZMGXUXOL-GRLAPFOSSA-N

SRX251, or SRX-251, also known as API-251, is a selective vasopressin V_{1A} receptor antagonist that is or was under development for the treatment of aggression. It was also being developed for the treatment of dysmenorrhea, but development for this indication was discontinued. The drug is taken by mouth. SRX251 reduces aggressive behavior in rodents. It is or was being developed by Azevan Pharmaceuticals. In 2007, it was in phase 1 clinical trials.

== See also ==
- List of investigational aggression drugs
- SRX246
- Balovaptan
- PF-184563
- Relcovaptan
- RG7713
