= Psychotic depression =

- Other names: Depressive psychosis, major depressive disorder with psychotic features
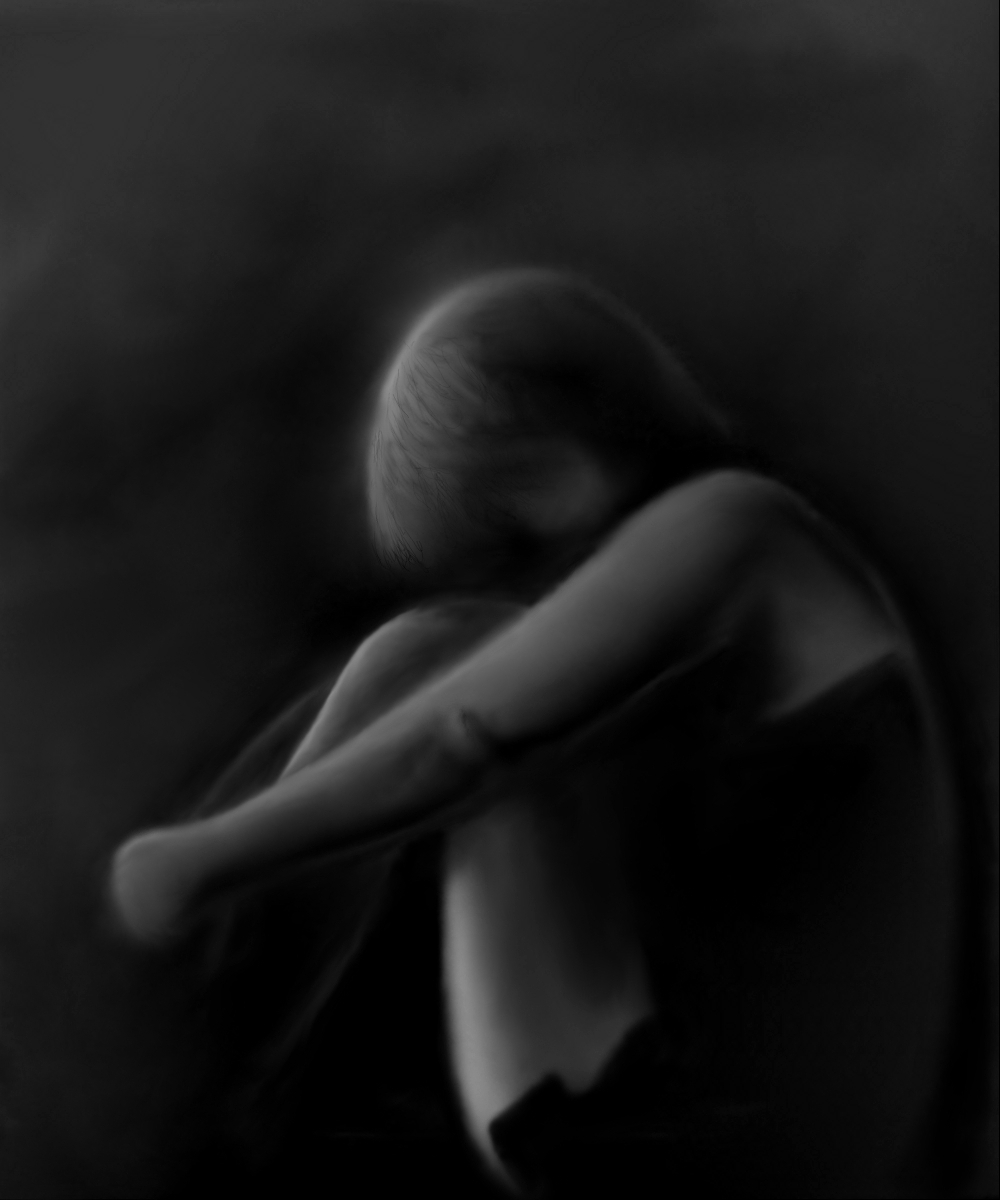
- A drawing that attempts to capture the sadness, loneliness, and detachment from reality, as described by patients with psychotic depression
- Specialty: Psychiatry
- Symptoms: Hallucinations, delusions, low mood
- Complications: Self-harm, Suicide
- Usual onset: 20-40 years old
- Duration: Days to weeks, sometimes longer
- Risk factors: Family history of depression, bipolar disorder, or psychosis
- Diagnostic method: Clinical interview
- Differential diagnosis: Schizoaffective disorder, schizophrenia, personality disorders, dissociative disorders
- Treatment: Medication, cognitive behavioral therapy
- Medication: Antidepressants, antipsychotics
- Frequency: 0.35-1%

Psychotic depression, also known as depressive psychosis or major depressive disorder with psychotic features, is a major depressive episode that is accompanied by psychotic symptoms. It can occur in the context of bipolar disorder or major depressive disorder. Psychotic depression can be difficult to distinguish from schizoaffective disorder, a diagnosis which also combines mood and psychotic symptoms, though requires the presence of psychotic symptoms for at least two weeks without any mood symptoms present. Unipolar psychotic depression requires that psychotic symptoms occur during severe depressive episodes, although residual psychotic symptoms may also be present in between episodes (e.g., during remission, mild depression, etc.). Diagnosis using the DSM-5 involves meeting the criteria for a major depressive episode, along with the criteria for "mood-congruent or mood-incongruent psychotic features" specifier.

== Signs and symptoms ==
People with psychotic depression experience the symptoms of a major depressive episode, along with one or more psychotic symptoms, including delusions and/or hallucinations. Delusions can be classified as mood congruent or incongruent, depending on whether or not the nature of the delusions is in keeping with the individual's mood state. Common themes of mood congruent delusions include guilt, persecution, punishment, personal inadequacy, or disease. Half of patients experience more than one kind of delusion. Delusions occur without hallucinations in about one-half to two-thirds of patients with psychotic depression. Hallucinations can be auditory, visual, olfactory (smell), or tactile (touch), and are congruent with delusional material. Affect is sad, not flat. Severe anhedonia, loss of interest, and psychomotor retardation are typically present.

== Cause ==
Psychotic symptoms tend to develop after an individual has already had several episodes of depression without psychosis. However, once psychotic symptoms have emerged, they tend to reappear with each future depressive episode. The prognosis for psychotic depression is not considered to be as poor as for schizoaffective disorders or primary psychotic disorders. Still, those who have experienced a depressive episode with psychotic features have an increased risk of relapse and suicide compared to those without psychotic features, and they tend to have more pronounced sleep abnormalities.

Family members of those who have experienced psychotic depression are at increased risk for both psychotic depression and schizophrenia.

Most patients with psychotic depression report having an initial episode between the ages of 20 and 40. As with other depressive episodes, psychotic depression tends to be episodic, with symptoms lasting for a certain amount of time and then subsiding. While psychotic depression can be chronic (lasting more than 2 years), most depressive episodes last less than 24 months. People who received appropriate treatment for psychotic depression went into "remission" and have reported a quality of life similar to that of people without PD.

== Pathophysiology ==
There are a number of biological features that may distinguish psychotic depression from non-psychotic depression. The most significant difference may be the presence of an abnormality in the hypothalamic pituitary adrenal axis (HPA). The HPA axis appears to be dysregulated in psychotic depression, with dexamethasone suppression tests demonstrating higher levels of cortisol following dexamethasone administration (i.e. lower cortisol suppression). Those with psychotic depression also have higher ventricular-brain ratios than those with non-psychotic depression.

== Diagnosis ==
=== Differential diagnosis ===
Psychotic symptoms are often missed in psychotic depression, either because patients do not think their symptoms are abnormal or they attempt to conceal their symptoms from others. On the other hand, psychotic depression may be confused with schizoaffective disorder. Due to overlapping symptoms, differential diagnosis includes also dissociative disorders.

== Treatment ==
Several treatment guidelines recommend pharmaceutical treatments that include either the combination of a second-generation antidepressant and atypical antipsychotic or tricyclic antidepressant monotherapy or electroconvulsive therapy (ECT) as the first-line treatment for unipolar psychotic depression.

There is no evidence for or against the use of mifepristone.

=== Combined antidepressant and antipsychotic medications ===
There is some evidence indicating that combination therapy with an antidepressant plus an antipsychotic is more effective in treating psychotic depression than either antidepressant treatment alone or placebo. In the context of psychotic depression, the following are the most well-studied antidepressant/antipsychotic combinations:

First-generation

- Amitriptyline/perphenazine
- Amitriptyline/haloperidol

Second-generation

- Venlafaxine/quetiapine
- Olanzapine/fluoxetine
- Olanzapine/sertraline

=== Antidepressant medications ===
There is insufficient evidence to determine if treatment with an antidepressant alone is effective. Tricyclic antidepressants may be particularly dangerous, because overdosing has the potential to cause fatal cardiac arrhythmias.

=== Antipsychotic medications ===
There is insufficient evidence to determine if treatment with antipsychotic medications alone is effective. Olanzapine may be an effective monotherapy in psychotic depression, although there is evidence that it is ineffective for depressive symptoms as a monotherapy; and olanzapine/fluoxetine is more effective. Quetiapine monotherapy may be particularly helpful in psychotic depression since it has both antidepressant and antipsychotic effects and a reasonable tolerability profile compared to other atypical antipsychotics. The current drug-based treatments of psychotic depression are reasonably effective but can cause side effects, such as nausea, headaches, dizziness, and weight gain.

=== Electroconvulsive therapy ===
In modern practice of ECT a therapeutic clonic seizure is induced by electric current via electrodes placed on a person under general anesthesia. Despite much research the exact mechanism of action of ECT is still not known. ECT carries the risk of temporary cognitive deficits (e.g., confusion, memory problems), in addition to the burden of repeated exposures to general anesthesia.

=== Repetitive Transcranial Magnetic Stimulation (rTMS) ===
Repetitive Transcranial magnetic stimulation (rTMS) is a noninvasive neurotherapy, a form of brain stimulation in which a changing magnetic field is used to induce an electric current at a specific area of the brain through electromagnetic induction. The exact mechanism of action of rTMS is still unknown. There is insufficient research to suggest that rTMS is effective in treating psychotic depression, with most evidence finding it is less effective for psychotic depression when compared to non-psychotic depression. Some studies have found the rTMS can induce psychotic symptoms, such as delusions, although these symptoms normally self-resolve after discontinuing treatment.

== Research ==
Efforts are made to find a treatment which targets the proposed specific underlying pathophysiology of psychotic depression. A promising candidate was mifepristone, which by competitively blocking certain neuro-receptors, renders cortisol less able to directly act on the brain and was thought to therefore correct an overactive HPA axis. However, a Phase III clinical trial, which investigated the use of mifepristone in PMD, was terminated early due to lack of efficacy.

Transcranial magnetic stimulation (TMS) is being investigated as an alternative to ECT in the treatment of depression. TMS involves the administration of a focused electromagnetic field to the cortex to stimulate specific nerve pathways.

Research has shown that psychotic depression differs from non-psychotic depression in a number of ways: potential precipitating factors, underlying biology, symptomatology beyond psychotic symptoms, long-term prognosis, and responsiveness to psychopharmacological treatment and ECT.

== Prognosis ==
The long-term outcome for psychotic depression is generally poorer than for non-psychotic depression.

== Epidemiology ==
The rate of psychotic depression in the general population is estimated to be 0.35-1%. There is a higher risk of psychotic depression in those with a family history of depression, psychosis, or bipolar disorder.
