= Tedatioxetine =

Chemical compound

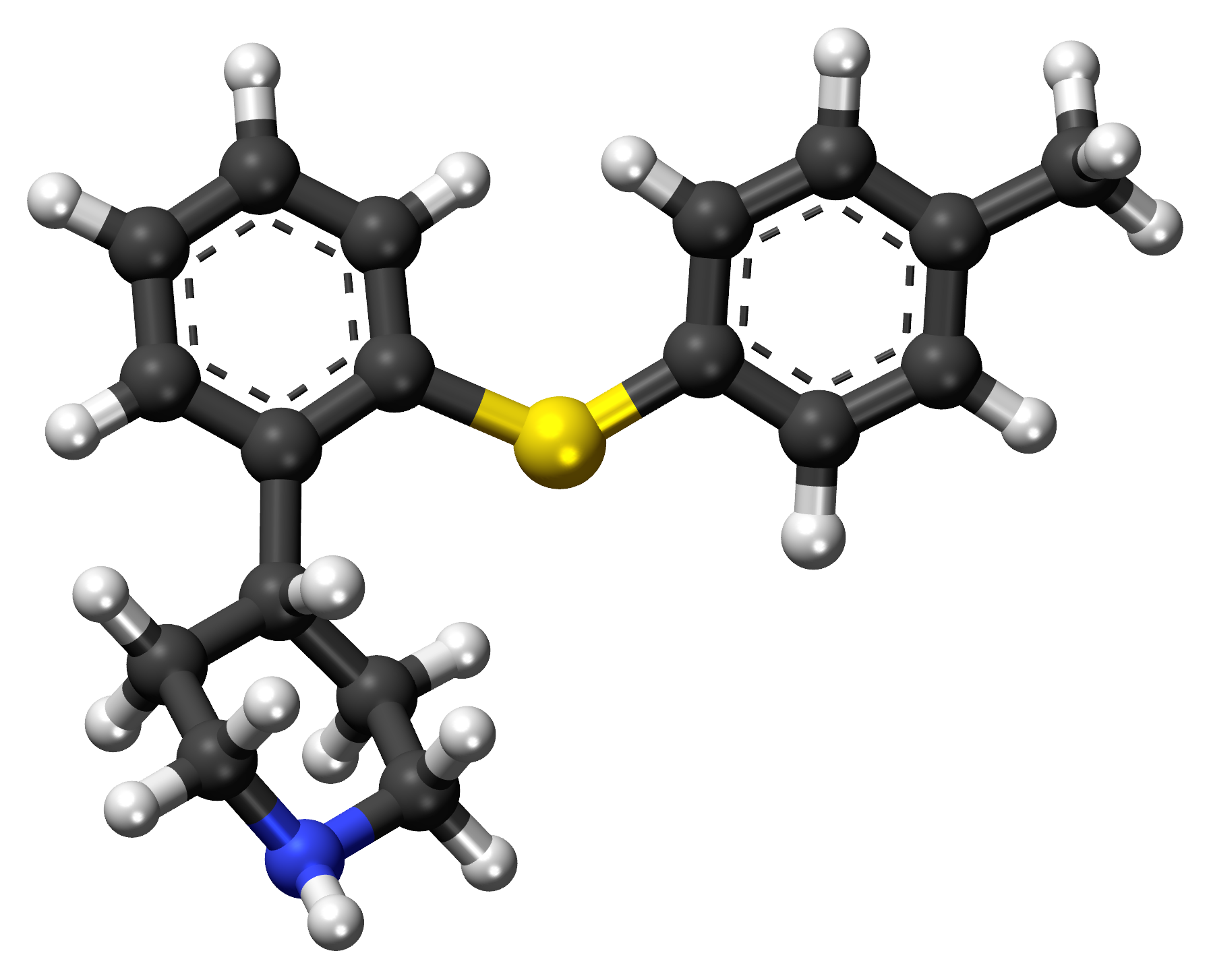

Clinical data
- Other names: Lu AA24530; Lu-AA-24530
- ATC code: none

Legal status
- Legal status: Investigational

Identifiers
- IUPAC name: 4-{2-[(4-methylphenyl)sulfanyl]phenyl}piperidine
- CAS Number: 508233-95-2
- PubChem CID: 9878913
- ChemSpider: 8054590
- UNII: 5H681S8O3S
- KEGG: D10170
- CompTox Dashboard (EPA): DTXSID801029350

Chemical and physical data
- Formula: C_{18}H_{21}NS
- Molar mass: 283.43 g·mol^{−1}
- 3D model (JSmol): Interactive image
- SMILES: CC(C=C1)=CC=C1SC2=C(C3CCNCC3)C=CC=C2
- InChI: InChI=1S/C18H21NS/c1-14-6-8-16(9-7-14)20-18-5-3-2-4-17(18)15-10-12-19-13-11-15/h2-9,15,19H,10-13H2,1H3; Key:CVASBKDYSQKLSO-UHFFFAOYSA-N

Tedatioxetine (developmental code name Lu AA24530) is an experimental antidepressant that was discovered by scientists at Lundbeck; in 2007 Lundbeck and Takeda entered into a partnership that included tedatioxetine but was focused on another, more advanced Lundbeck drug candidate, vortioxetine.

As of 2009, it was in phase II clinical trials for major depressive disorder,

but there have been no updates since then, and as of August 2013 it was no longer displayed on Lundbeck's product pipeline.

On May 10, 2016, all work on tedatioxetine stopped.

== Pharmacology ==
=== Pharmacokinetics ===
CYP2D6 variability posed challenges for consistent dosing across populations, particularly for CYP2D6*17 and *41 carriers.

== Synthesis ==
A Chinese patent shows that there has been interest in this compound outside of Lundbeck.

== See also ==
- MIN-117
- TGBA01AD
- Vilazodone
- Vortioxetine
