= DSRI (disambiguation) =

DSRI may refer to:

- Danish Space Research Institute
- Deep-Sea Research Part I: Oceanographic Research Papers, a scientific journal published by Elsevier
- Defence and Security Research Institute, an institute of the Royal Military College of Canada
- Democratic and Secular Republicans of Iran, a political alliance; see Political parties in Iran
- Dopamine-serotonin reuptake inhibitor, also known as Serotonin-dopamine reuptake inhibitor

Democratic and Secular Republicans of Iran
