= C18H22N2O2 =

The molecular formula C_{18}H_{22}N_{2}O_{2} (molar mass: 298.38 g/mol, exact mass: 298.1681 u) may refer to:

- 4-AcO-DALT
- Carazolol
- Fumigaclavine A
- Hypidone
- Phenacaine
