= C22H19F3N4O2 =

The molecular formula C_{22}H_{19}F_{3}N_{4}O_{2} (molar mass: 428.415 g/mol) may refer to:

- SB-243213
- SB-247853
