= Brezivaptan =

Chemical compound

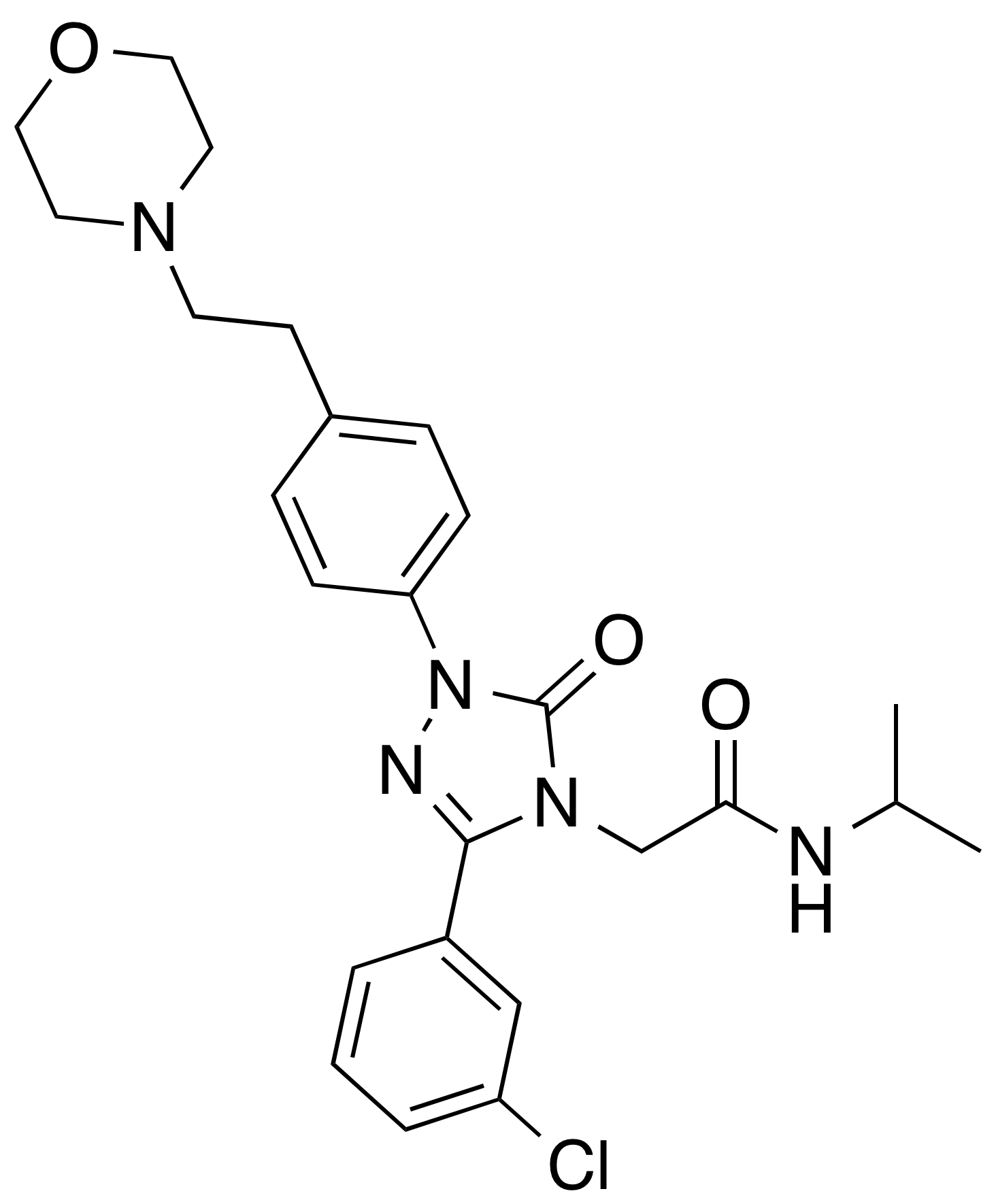

Clinical data
- Other names: TS-121; TS121; TS-1211; TS1211; THY1773; THY-1773; ANC-501; ANC501
- Routes of administration: By mouth

Identifiers
- IUPAC name: 2-[3-(3-chlorophenyl)-1-[4-(2-morpholin-4-ylethyl)phenyl]-5-oxo-1,2,4-triazol-4-yl]-N-propan-2-ylacetamide
- CAS Number: 1370444-22-6
- PubChem CID: 56952080
- DrugBank: DB18907
- ChemSpider: 129325033
- UNII: 575OB1CKN0
- ChEMBL: ChEMBL5314910

Chemical and physical data
- Formula: C_{25}H_{30}ClN_{5}O_{3}
- Molar mass: 484.00 g·mol^{−1}
- 3D model (JSmol): Interactive image
- SMILES: CC(C)NC(=O)CN1C(=NN(C1=O)C2=CC=C(C=C2)CCN3CCOCC3)C4=CC(=CC=C4)Cl
- InChI: InChI=1S/C25H30ClN5O3/c1-18(2)27-23(32)17-30-24(20-4-3-5-21(26)16-20)28-31(25(30)33)22-8-6-19(7-9-22)10-11-29-12-14-34-15-13-29/h3-9,16,18H,10-15,17H2,1-2H3,(H,27,32); Key:YCLGGNJZGIFVKX-UHFFFAOYSA-N

Brezivaptan (developmental code names ANC-501, THY-1773, TS-121) is an orally active, selective vasopressin V_{1B} receptor antagonist which is under development by Taisho Pharmaceutical for the adjunctive treatment of major depressive disorder. As of November 2022, it is in phase II clinical trials for this indication.

== See also ==
- ABT-436
- Balovaptan
- List of investigational antidepressants
- Nelivaptan
- SRX-246
