= Nelivaptan =

Chemical compound

Clinical data
- Other names: SSR-149415; SSR-149,415; SSR149415; NB-415; NB415; BH-200; BH200
- Routes of administration: Oral
- Drug class: Vasopressin V_{1B} receptor antagonist
- ATC code: None

Identifiers
- IUPAC name: (2S,4R)-1-[(3R)-5-chloro-1-(2,4-dimethoxyphenyl)sulfonyl-3-(2-methoxyphenyl)-2-oxo-indolin-3-yl]-4-hydroxy-N,N-dimethyl-pyrrolidine-2-carboxamide
- CAS Number: 439687-69-1
- PubChem CID: 9895468
- IUPHAR/BPS: 2202
- ChemSpider: 8071134
- UNII: 3TY57MQ4OA
- ChEMBL: ChEMBL582857
- CompTox Dashboard (EPA): DTXSID7047358
- ECHA InfoCard: 100.210.987

Chemical and physical data
- Formula: C_{30}H_{32}ClN_{3}O_{8}S
- Molar mass: 630.11 g·mol^{−1}
- InChI: InChI=1S/C30H32ClN3O8S/c1-32(2)28(36)24-15-19(35)17-33(24)30(21-8-6-7-9-25(21)41-4)22-14-18(31)10-12-23(22)34(29(30)37)43(38,39)27-13-11-20(40-3)16-26(27)42-5/h6-14,16,19,24,35H,15,17H2,1-5H3/t19-,24+,30+/m1/s1; Key:NJXZWIIMWNEOGJ-WEWKHQNJSA-N

Nelivaptan (INN; developmental code names SSR-149415, NB-415, and BH-200) is a selective, orally active, non-peptide vasopressin V_{1B} receptor antagonist. The drug had entered clinical trials for treatment of anxiety and depression. In July 2008, Sanofi-Aventis announced that further development of this drug had been halted. Subsequently, nelivaptan was developed by Nelivabon for treatment of depressive disorders under the code name NB-145, but development was discontinued in 2022. However, it is also under development by HMNC Brain Health for major depressive disorder under the code name BH-200, and is in phase 2 trials for this indication as of August 2025.

== See also ==
- Vasopressin receptor antagonist
- List of investigational antidepressants
- List of investigational anxiolytics
- ABT-436
- Balovaptan
- SRX-246
- TS-121
