= Mitizodone =

Clinical data
- Other names: HEC-113995; HEC113995
- Routes of administration: Oral
- Drug class: Serotonin reuptake inhibitor; Serotonin 5-HT_{1A} receptor partial agonist

Mitizodone (developmental code name HEC-113995) is a serotonin reuptake inhibitor and serotonin 5-HT_{1A} receptor partial agonist which is under development for the treatment of major depressive disorder. It is being developed by Sunshine Lake Pharma and is being developed towards approval specifically in China. As of April 2023, no recent development of mitizodone has been reported. The drug has reached phase 3 clinical trials. Its chemical structure does not yet appear to have been disclosed.

== See also ==
- List of investigational antidepressants
- Serotonin modulator and stimulator
- Vilazodone
- Vortioxetine
