= Centpyraquin =

Clinical data
- Other names: IHCH-7162; IHCH7162; Compound 69-183
- Drug class: Serotonin 5-HT_{1A} receptor agonist; Serotonin 5-HT_{2A} receptor weak partial agonist or antagonist; Antipsychotic; Antihypertensive agent
- ATC code: None

Identifiers
- IUPAC name: 4-(1,2,4,4a,5,6-hexahydropyrazino[1,2-a]quinolin-3-yl)-1-(4-fluorophenyl)butan-1-one
- CAS Number: 26049-76-3
- PubChem CID: 182600
- ChemSpider: 158810
- ChEMBL: ChEMBL341774

Chemical and physical data
- Formula: C_{22}H_{25}FN_{2}O
- Molar mass: 352.453 g·mol^{−1}
- 3D model (JSmol): Interactive image
- SMILES: C1CC2=CC=CC=C2N3C1CN(CC3)CCCC(=O)C4=CC=C(C=C4)F
- InChI: InChI=1S/C22H25FN2O/c23-19-10-7-18(8-11-19)22(26)6-3-13-24-14-15-25-20(16-24)12-9-17-4-1-2-5-21(17)25/h1-2,4-5,7-8,10-11,20H,3,6,9,12-16H2; Key:CDMKFCYALGWSEN-UHFFFAOYSA-N

Centpyraquin, also known as IHCH-7162 or as compound 69-183, is a serotonin receptor modulator related to the partial ergolines and phenylpiperazines. It is a serotonin 5-HT_{1A} receptor agonist and a mixed modulator of the serotonin 5-HT_{2A} receptor, acting as a weak partial agonist of G protein signaling and as an antagonist of β-arrestin2 recruitment. The drug has antipsychotic-like, CNS depressant, and antihypertensive effects in animals. Centpyraquin was developed by researchers in India and first described by the 1970s before being studied and described further in 2024.

== See also ==
- IHCH-7179
- Centpropazine
