= Pipamperone =

Antipsychotic drug

Clinical data
- Trade names: Dipiperon
- Other names: Carpiperone, floropipamide, fluoropipamide, floropipamide hydrochloride (JAN), McN-JR 3345; R-3345
- AHFS/Drugs.com: International Drug Names
- Routes of administration: Oral
- ATC code: N05AD05 (WHO)

Legal status
- Legal status: BR: Class C1 (Other controlled substances)

Pharmacokinetic data
- Elimination half-life: 17-22 hours
- Duration of action: 0.5-1 hour

Identifiers
- IUPAC name: 1-[4-(4-fluorophenyl)-4-oxobutyl]-4-piperidin-1-ylpiperidine-4-carboxamide
- CAS Number: 1893-33-0
- PubChem CID: 4830
- IUPHAR/BPS: 92
- DrugBank: DB09286
- ChemSpider: 4664
- UNII: 5402501F0W
- KEGG: D02622
- ChEMBL: ChEMBL440294
- CompTox Dashboard (EPA): DTXSID8048369
- ECHA InfoCard: 100.119.828

Chemical and physical data
- Formula: C_{21}H_{30}FN_{3}O_{2}
- Molar mass: 375.488 g·mol^{−1}
- 3D model (JSmol): Interactive image
- SMILES: Fc1ccc(cc1)C(=O)CCCN3CCC(C(=O)N)(N2CCCCC2)CC3
- InChI: InChI=1S/C21H30FN3O2/c22-18-8-6-17(7-9-18)19(26)5-4-12-24-15-10-21(11-16-24,20(23)27)25-13-2-1-3-14-25/h6-9H,1-5,10-16H2,(H2,23,27); Key:AXKPFOAXAHJUAG-UHFFFAOYSA-N

Pipamperone (INN, USAN, BAN), sold under the brand name Dipiperon, is a typical antipsychotic of the butyrophenone family used in the treatment of schizophrenia and as a sleep aid for depression. It is or has been marketed under brand names including Dipiperon, Dipiperal, Piperonil, Piperonyl, and Propitan. Pipamperone was discovered at Janssen Pharmaceutica in 1961, and entered clinical trials in the United States in 1963.

== Medical uses ==
Pipamperone was developed for use as an antipsychotic in the treatment of schizophrenia.

Pipamperone might be useful as a hallucinogen antidote or "trip killer" in blocking the effects of serotonergic psychedelics like psilocybin.

== Pharmacology ==
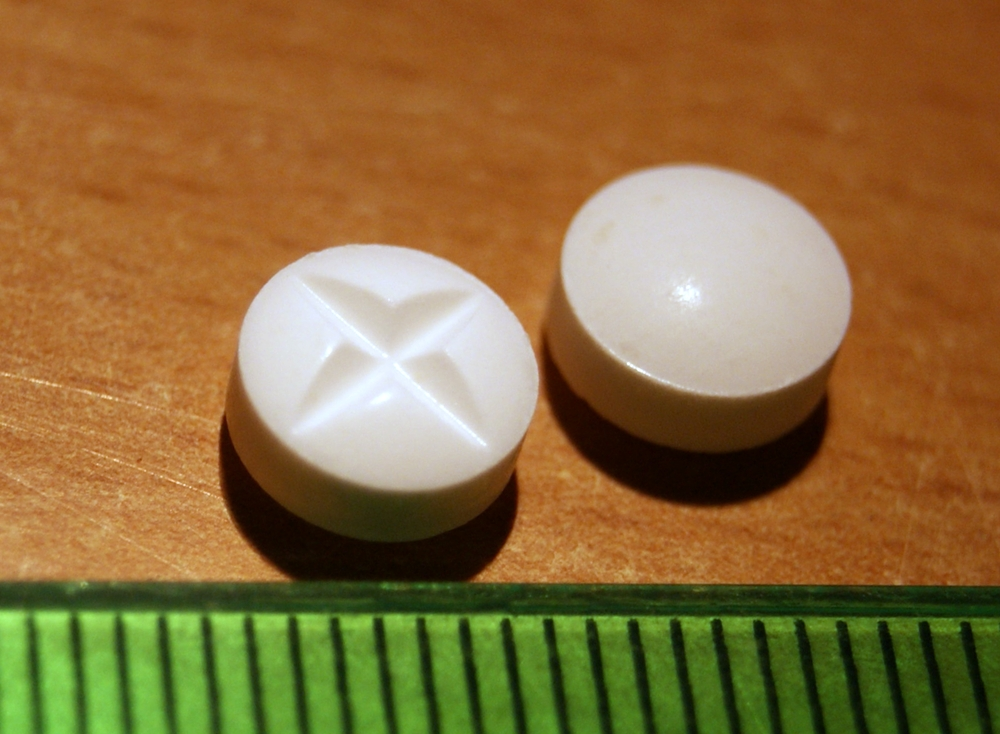
Pipamperon Neuraxpharm, 40mg

Pipamperone acts as an antagonist of the 5-HT_{2A}, 5-HT_{2B}, 5-HT_{2C} D_{2}, D_{3}, D_{4}, α_{1}-adrenergic, and α_{2}-adrenergic receptors. It shows much higher affinity for the 5-HT_{2A} and D_{4} receptors over the D_{2} receptor (15-fold in the case of the D_{4} receptor, and even higher in the case of the 5-HT_{2A} receptor), being regarded as "highly selective" for the former two sites at low doses. Pipamperone has low and likely insignificant affinity for the H_{1} and mACh receptors, as well as for other serotonin and dopamine receptors.

Pipamperone is considered to have been a forerunner to the atypical antipsychotics, if not an atypical antipsychotic itself, due to its prominent serotonin antagonism. It is also used to normalise mood and sleep patterns and has antianxiety effects in neurotic patients.

Affinity
Site	pKi
D_{1}	5.61
D_{2}	6.71
D_{3}	6.58
D_{4}	7.95
5 HT_{1A}	5.46
5 HT_{1B}	5.54
5 HT_{1D}	6.14
5 HT_{1E}	5.44
5 HT_{1F}	<5
5-HT_{2A}	8.19
5 HT_{5}	5.35
5 HT_{7}	6.26
α_{1}	7.23
α_{2A}	6.15
α_{2B}	7.08
α_{2C}	6.25

== Antidepressant effects ==
Low-dose pipamperone (5 mg twice daily) has been found to accelerate and enhance the antidepressant effect of citalopram (40 mg once daily), in a combination (citalopram/pipamperone) referred to as PipCit (code name PNB-01).

== See also ==
- Clozapine
- Melperone
- Pimozide
- Piritramide
- Risperidone
