= Flupentixol/melitracen =

Combination drug

Combination of
- Flupentixol: Typical antipsychotic
- Melitracen: Tricyclic antidepressant

Clinical data
- Trade names: Deanxit
- Routes of administration: Oral
- ATC code: N06CA02 (WHO)

Legal status
- Legal status: In general: ℞ (Prescription only)

Identifiers
- CAS Number: 214556-54-4

Flupentixol/melitracen (trade name Deanxit) is a combination of two psychoactive agents flupentixol and melitracen. It is designed for short term usage only. It is produced by Lundbeck.

Flupentixol is a thioxanthene antipsychotic, and melitracen is a tricyclic antidepressant. Low dose Flupentixol (0.5 mg-3 mg) has antidepressant and anti-anxiety effects, while melitracen has antidepressant effect. The mixture of the two components is used to treat mild to moderate mental disorders.

Flupentixol acts as a dopamine 1 and 2 receptor antagonist and melitracen acts in similar way to other tricyclic antidepressants blocking the reuptake of serotonin and norepinephrine in presynaptic terminals.

== Medical uses ==
Fixed dose combination of flupentixol and melitracen is indicated for the treatment of anxiety, depression, asthenia, neurasthenia, masked depression, psychosomatic affections accompanied by anxiety and apathy, menopausal depressions, and dysphoria or depression in alcoholics and drug addicts.

and is primarily indicated for the following medical uses:

- Treatment of depression: Used in adults who may present with symptoms of anxiety, low mood, lack of enthusiasm, and restlessness.
- Treatment of anxiety: Indicated for patients with anxiety disorders, especially when depression is also present or when there is associated asthenia (unexplained fatigue or weakness).
- Management of asthenia: Used for conditions characterized by fatigue, low energy, and diminished motivation, frequently seen with mood disturbances.
- Psychosomatic and neurotic disorders: Recommended for depressive neuroses, psychogenic depression, masked depression, neurasthenia, and psychosomatic affections where anxiety, depression, or apathy are prominent.
- Menopausal depression: Often indicated for mood changes associated with menopause.
- Depression in alcoholics and drug addicts: Used in cases where mood disorders accompany substance dependence.

=== Route of administration ===
Trade Name	Active Ingredient	Routes	Dose(s)	Manufacturer
Depixol	Flupentixol decanoate	Deep Intramuscular Injection	20 mg/mL Solution (Amount injected varies depending on prescribed dose)	Lundbeck
Deanxit	Flupentixol, Melitracen	Oral, Tablet form	0.5 mg Flupentixol, 10 mg Melitracen (per tablet)	Lundbeck

This table does not represent an exhaustive list, but demonstrates the various methods this medication is able to be administered. Flupentixol and melitracen is produced by numerous pharmaceutical companies worldwide, with many using oral tablets as the preferred route.

=== Dosage ===
Adult: Each tablet contains flupentixol 0.5 mg and melitracen 10 mg. The usual adult dose is one tablet in the morning and one at midday; in severe cases the morning dose may be increased to two tablets. The maximum recommended dose is four tablets per day.

Elderly: The usual starting dose is one tablet in the morning; in severe cases, one tablet may also be given at midday.

== Contraindications ==
Circulatory collapse, depressed level of consciousness due to any cause, Coma. Severe depression requiring hospitalization or electroconvulsive therapy. Not recommended for use in states of excitement or overactivity.

== Adverse reactions ==
Unsafe in porphyria. Caution when used in patients with epilepsy; Parkinson's disease; narrow angle glaucoma; prostatic hypertrophy; hypothyroidism; hyperthyroidism; liver disease; cardiac disease or arrhythmias; severe respiratory disease; renal failure; myasthenia gravis; phaeochromocytoma. Patients with hypersensitivity to thioxanthenes or other antipsychotics. Close monitoring for changes in behaviour, suicidal thoughts or clinical worsening during the initial part of the treatment is recommended. May impair control of diabetes; monitor blood glucose in diabetics.

Drowsiness, dry mouth, constipation, vomiting, dyspepsia, diarrhea, abdominal pain, nausea, flatulence. Extrapyramidal effects, especially in the initial phase of the treatment. Tachycardia, palpitations, prolonged QT interval, hypotension. Thrombocytopenia, neutropenia, leukopenia, agranulocytosis. Dyspnoea, myalgia, muscle rigidity, micturition disorder, urinary retention. Increased appetite and weight. Abnormal glucose tolerance and LFTs. Insomnia, depression, nervousness, agitation, decreased libido, Tardive dyskinesia.

== Drug Interactions ==
Increased risk of adverse effects when used with alcohol. May potentiate the effects of general anaesthetics and anticoagulants, and prolong the action of neuromuscular blockers. May increase anticholinergic effects of atropine and drugs with anticholinergic activity. May increase risk of neurotoxicity when used with sibutramine or lithium. Avoid concurrent usage with drugs that cause QT prolongation or cardiac arrhythmias. May inhibit metabolism of TCAs. May antagonise effects of adrenaline and sympathomimetics, and reverse antihypertensive effects of guanethidine.

== Pharmacology ==
=== Mechanism of action ===
Flupentixol inhibits dopamine-mediated effects by acting as an antagonist at the D(2) and D(1a) dopamine receptors. It also acts as a 5-HT2 receptor antagonist.

Melitracen is a TCA with anxiolytic properties. At low doses, it has activating properties. It is also a bipolar thymoleptic. The exact mechanism of Action is not fully understood.

=== Pharmacokinetics ===
Absorption: Flupentixol: Readily absorbed in the GI tract.

Distribution: Flupentixol: >95% bound to plasma proteins; widely distributed in the body and crosses the blood brain barrier.

Metabolism: Flupentixol: Extensively hepatic metabolism.

Excretion: Flupentixol: Excreted in urine and faeces in the form of many metabolites.

== Society and culture ==
=== Regulatory status ===
This medication first reached market in 1973. It is approved in 21 countries worldwide, which does not include its home country of Denmark. It was taken off the approved list in India in 2014, citing a lack of required information such as mandatory clinical trial results in its 1998 approval decision. It is approved in China.

=== Brand names ===
The brand name for the original version by Lundback is Deanxit. International versions of the name include:

- China: 黛力新
- Taiwan: 得安緒

Brand names for generics include:

- Pentoxol.m (scotmann pharmaceuticals Pakistan)
- Sensit (Eskayef Bangladesh Ltd.)
- Renxit (Renata Ltd.)
- Melixol (Square Pharmaceuticals Ltd.)
- Melanxit (Organic Health Care Ltd.)
- Benzit (Bio-Pharma Ltd.)
- Leanxit (ACME Laboratories Ltd.)
- Danxipress (Vickmans Lab Ltd.)
- Amilax (Amico Lab Ltd)
- Angenta (Healthcare Pharmaceuticals Ltd.)
- EXZILOR (SUN PHARMA LABORATORIES LTD.)
- Mocalm (Swiss Pharmaceutical Co. Ltd. 瑞士藥廠股份有限公司新市廠)
- Danxit (Astra Biopharmaceuticals LTD.)

=== Use and abuse ===
Flupentixol/melitracen is the single most popular antidepressant in China, according to 2013–2018 prescription data. It is generally not prescribed by psychiatrists, but by clinicians working in other areas, mainly gastroenterologists, cardiologists, endocrinologists, neurologists, even general physicians and surgeons. Only when a patient encounters a side effect on this drug are they referred to a psychiatrist. DXY.cn notes a significant lack of evidence-based guidance on using and discontinuing this medication despite its widespread use in China. Adverse effects from longer-term use and withdrawal symptoms have been reported.

Self-medication with this drug used to be common in India; it still is in China, where pharmacies exercise little care to ensure the existence of a prescription. It is also easily obtained in Lebanon without a prescription. In a study of Lebanese emergency department patients who take flupentixol/melitracen, 36% (45 out of 125) were diagnosed as having a substance use disorder for this medication under the DSM-V criteria. Among Jordanian pharmacists, 70.6% were willing to dispense the medication in situations including malpractice.

== See also ==
- Amitriptyline/perphenazine
- Olanzapine/fluoxetine
- Tranylcypromine/trifluoperazine
