= Citalopram/pipamperone =

- Citalopram

- Pipamperone

Combination of
- Citalopram: Selective serotonin reuptake inhibitor
- Pipamperone: Antipsychotic; Serotonin 5-HT_{2A} receptor antagonist; Dopamine D_{2} receptor antagonist

Clinical data
- Other names: PipCit; PNB-01; PNB01; Pipamperone/citalopram
- Routes of administration: Oral

Citalopram/pipamperone (developmental code names PipCit, PNB-01) is a combination of citalopram, a selective serotonin reuptake inhibitor (SSRI) and antidepressant, and low-dose pipamperone, an antipsychotic, which is or was under development for the treatment of major depressive disorder. At the low doses used in the combination, pipamperone is said to act as a selective serotonin 5-HT_{2A} and dopamine D_{4} receptor antagonist, and is thought might accelerate or augment the antidepressant effects of citalopram. The combination is or was being developed by PharmaNeuroBoost. As of September 2015, no recent development has been reported. It reached phase 3 clinical trials.

== See also ==
- List of investigational antidepressants
