= JNJ-26990990 =

Experimental anticonvulsant drug

Clinical data
- Other names: N-((Benzo[b]thien-3-yl)methyl)sulfamide

Identifiers
- IUPAC name: 3-[(Sulfamoylamino)methyl]-1-benzothiophene
- CAS Number: 877316-38-6
- PubChem CID: 11687376
- ChemSpider: 9862103
- UNII: QFG58Y96EP
- ChEBI: CHEBI:580267
- ChEMBL: ChEMBL466517
- CompTox Dashboard (EPA): DTXSID20470625

Chemical and physical data
- Formula: C_{9}H_{10}N_{2}O_{2}S_{2}
- Molar mass: 242.31 g·mol^{−1}

JNJ-26990990 is a broad-spectrum anticonvulsant drug currently under development by Janssen Pharmaceutica as a second-generation follow-up to the marketed drug topiramate. It was designed to have the same anticonvulsant effects as topiramate, but without the side effects associated with topiramate's carbonic anhydrase inhibition. It also has potential use in the treatment of inflammatory pain, neuropathic pain, and depression.

JNJ-26990990 entered phase II clinical trials in October 2007.

Metabolites and radioactive isotope-labeled derivatives of JNJ-26990990 have also been prepared to support its development.

== See also ==
- JNJ-26489112
