= Aripiprazole/sertraline =

Medication under development by Otsuka Pharmaceutical

Combination of
- Aripiprazole: Atypical antipsychotic
- Sertraline: Selective serotonin reuptake inhibitor

Clinical data
- Other names: ASC-01
- Routes of administration: By mouth

Legal status
- Legal status: US: Investigational New Drug

Aripiprazole/sertraline (developmental code name ASC-01) is a combination formulation of aripiprazole (Abilify), an atypical antipsychotic, and sertraline (Zoloft), a selective serotonin reuptake inhibitor (SSRI), which was under development by Otsuka Pharmaceutical for the treatment of major depressive disorder (MDD). It combines serotonin reuptake inhibition from sertraline and modulation of dopamine and serotonin receptors from aripiprazole. In July 2017, it was in preregistration in Japan for the treatment of MDD. However, in September 2018, the regulatory submission in Japan for MDD was withdrawn.

== See also ==
- List of investigational antidepressants
- Olanzapine/fluoxetine
