= GSK-588045 =

Clinical data
- Other names: GSK588045
- Routes of administration: Unspecified
- Drug class: Serotonin 5-HT_{1A}, 5-HT_{1B}, and 5-HT_{1D} receptor antagonist; Weak serotonin reuptake inhibitor

Identifiers
- IUPAC name: 6-[2-[4-(2-methylquinolin-5-yl)piperazin-1-yl]ethyl]-4H-imidazo[5,1-c][1,4]benzoxazine-3-carboxamide
- CAS Number: 876922-98-4
- PubChem CID: 11655728
- ChemSpider: 9830466
- UNII: 8HG5QW7P7Z
- ChEMBL: ChEMBL1241913

Chemical and physical data
- Formula: C_{27}H_{28}N_{6}O_{2}
- Molar mass: 468.561 g·mol^{−1}
- 3D model (JSmol): Interactive image
- SMILES: CC1=NC2=C(C=C1)C(=CC=C2)N3CCN(CC3)CCC4=C5C(=CC=C4)N6C=NC(=C6CO5)C(=O)N
- InChI: InChI=1S/C27H28N6O2/c1-18-8-9-20-21(30-18)5-3-6-22(20)32-14-12-31(13-15-32)11-10-19-4-2-7-23-26(19)35-16-24-25(27(28)34)29-17-33(23)24/h2-9,17H,10-16H2,1H3,(H2,28,34); Key:HLQJZFFWUXHYMB-UHFFFAOYSA-N

GSK-588045 is a serotonin 5-HT_{1A}, 5-HT_{1B}, and 5-HT_{1D} receptor antagonist which was under development for the treatment of depressive and anxiety disorders but was never marketed. It is also a serotonin reuptake inhibitor, albeit much less potently than its serotonin 5-HT_{1} receptor antagonism. The drug increases brain serotonin levels in animals. It was being developed by GlaxoSmithKline. GSK-588045 reached phase 1 clinical trials prior to the discontinuation of its development.

== See also ==
- List of investigational antidepressants
- List of investigational anxiolytics
