= ALTO-203 =

Clinical data
- Other names: ALTO203
- Routes of administration: Oral
- Drug class: Histamine H_{3} receptor inverse agonist

ALTO-203 is a histamine H_{3} receptor inverse agonist which is under development for the treatment of major depressive disorder with anhedonia. It was also under development for other psychiatric disorders and neurodegenerative disorders, but development for these indications was discontinued. The drug is taken orally. It has been found to increase dopamine release in the nucleus accumbens and produce antianhedonic-like effects in rodents, effects which another histamine H_{3} receptor inverse agonist, pitolisant, did not produce. ALTO-203 is under development by Alto Neuroscience. As of July 2025, it is in phase 2 clinical trials for major depressive disorder. In a phase 1 trial, ALTO-203 was reported to increase subjective positive mood to a similar degree as modafinil. On the other hand, the drug failed to meet its primary endpoint, a measure of mood and alertness, compared to placebo in a phase 2 trial.

== See also ==
- List of investigational antidepressants
