= Tranylcypromine/trifluoperazine =

Combination drug

Tranylcypromine/trifluoperaizne
Combination of
- Tranylcypromine: Monoamine oxidase inhibitor
- Trifluoperazine: Typical antipsychotic

Clinical data
- Trade names: Parstelin, Parmodalin, Jatrosom N, Stelapar
- Routes of administration: Oral

Legal status
- Legal status: In general: ℞ (Prescription only)

Identifiers
- CAS Number: 60108-71-6

Tranylcypromine/trifluoperazine (brand names Parstelin, Parmodalin, Jatrosom N, Stelapar) is a combination formulation of the monoamine oxidase inhibitor antidepressant drug tranylcypromine and the typical antipsychotic drug trifluoperazine that has been used in the treatment of major depressive disorder. It contains 10 mg tranylcypromine and 1 mg trifluoperazine. The drug has been in clinical use since at least 1961.

It may come to assume a certain place in the treatment of borderline personality disorder.

== See also ==
- Amitriptyline/perphenazine
- Flupentixol/melitracen
- Olanzapine/fluoxetine
