= IHCH-7179 =

Clinical data
- Other names: IHCH7179
- Drug class: Serotonin 5-HT_{1A} receptor agonist; Serotonin 5-HT_{2A} receptor antagonist; Dopamine D_{2} receptor partial agonist
- ATC code: None

Identifiers
- IUPAC name: 1-(4-fluorophenyl)-4-(2,5,11-triazatetracyclo[7.6.1.0^{2,7}.0^{12,16}]hexadeca-1(15),9,12(16),13-tetraen-5-yl)butan-1-one
- CAS Number: 2813335-02-1
- PubChem CID: 171118537
- PDB ligand: EZX (PDBe, RCSB PDB)

Chemical and physical data
- Formula: C_{23}H_{24}FN_{3}O
- Molar mass: 377.463 g·mol^{−1}
- 3D model (JSmol): Interactive image
- SMILES: C1CN2C(CC3=CNC4=C3C2=CC=C4)CN1CCCC(=O)C5=CC=C(C=C5)F
- InChI: InChI=1S/C23H24FN3O/c24-18-8-6-16(7-9-18)22(28)5-2-10-26-11-12-27-19(15-26)13-17-14-25-20-3-1-4-21(27)23(17)20/h1,3-4,6-9,14,19,25H,2,5,10-13,15H2; Key:QNGJKKMQTDOCDJ-UHFFFAOYSA-N

IHCH-7179 is a serotonin and dopamine receptor modulator related to the ergolines and phenylpiperazines. It acts as a serotonin 5-HT_{1A} receptor agonist, serotonin 5-HT_{2A} receptor antagonist, and dopamine D_{2} receptor partial agonist. The drug produces antipsychotic-like effects in rodents, such as prevention of the hyperlocomotion induced by the NMDA receptor antagonist dizocilpine (MK-801). It also blocks the head-twitch response induced by the serotonergic psychedelic LSD. IHCH-7179 was first described in the scientific literature by 2024. It was developed by the Chinese Academy of Sciences and associated organizations in Shanghai, China. IHCH-7179 is of interest for potential treatment of schizophrenia.

== See also ==
- IHCH-7162
- Centpropazine
