= ABT-436 =

Chemical compound

Clinical data
- Routes of administration: By mouth

Identifiers
- CAS Number: 1642328-87-7
- PubChem SID: 472219270
- UNII: U6SIR21GRB

ABT-436 is an orally active, highly selective vasopressin V_{1B} receptor antagonist which was under development by Abbott Laboratories and AbbVie for the treatment of major depressive disorder, anxiety disorders, and alcoholism but was discontinued. It reached phase II clinical trials prior to the discontinuation of its development.

== See also ==
- Balovaptan
- Nelivaptan
- SRX-246
- TS-121
