= ICI-170809 =

Clinical data
- Other names: ICI-170,809; ICI170809; ZM-170809; ZM170809; Thromboserin
- Routes of administration: Unknown
- Drug class: Serotonin 5-HT_{2} receptor antagonist

Identifiers
- IUPAC name: N,N,2-trimethyl-1-(3-phenylquinolin-2-yl)sulfanylpropan-2-amine
- CAS Number: 85275-48-5
- PubChem CID: 134946
- ChemSpider: 118918
- UNII: 942AS5KEH1
- CompTox Dashboard (EPA): DTXSID901005759

Chemical and physical data
- Formula: C_{21}H_{24}N_{2}S
- Molar mass: 336.50 g·mol^{−1}
- 3D model (JSmol): Interactive image
- SMILES: CC(C)(CSC1=NC2=CC=CC=C2C=C1C3=CC=CC=C3)N(C)C
- InChI: InChI=1S/C21H24N2S/c1-21(2,23(3)4)15-24-20-18(16-10-6-5-7-11-16)14-17-12-8-9-13-19(17)22-20/h5-14H,15H2,1-4H3; Key:ARPRLCXPAGXBRL-UHFFFAOYSA-N

ICI-170809, also known as ZM-170809, is a selective serotonin 5-HT_{2} receptor antagonist which was under development for the treatment of major depressive disorder, arrhythmias, thrombosis, and ischemic heart disorders but was never marketed. It was being developed by AstraZeneca. The drug reached phase 2 clinical trials prior to the discontinuation of its development.

== See also ==
- List of investigational antidepressants
