= BMND07 =

Combination of
- Dimethyltryptamine: Serotonin receptor agonist Serotonergic psychedelic; Hallucinogen
- 5-MeO-DMT: Serotonin receptor agonist Serotonergic psychedelic; Hallucinogen

Clinical data
- Other names: BMND-07

BMND07, or BMND-07, is a combination of either dimethyltryptamine (DMT) or 5-MeO-DMT and another undisclosed compound which is under development for the treatment of depressive disorders. It is being developed by Biomind Labs. As of March 2022, it is in phase 1 clinical trials.

== See also ==
- List of investigational hallucinogens and entactogens
- List of investigational antidepressants
