= BI-1569912 =

Clinical data
- Other names: BI1569912
- Routes of administration: Oral
- Drug class: NR2B subunit-containing NMDA receptor negative allosteric modulator

BI-1569912 is a selective negative allosteric modulator of NR2B-containing NMDA receptors. It is being developed by Boehringer Ingelheim to treat major depressive disorder. As of May 2025, it is in phase 2 clinical trials.

== See also ==
- List of investigational antidepressants
