= Amitriptyline/perphenazine =

Combination drug

- Amitriptyline molecular structure

- Perphenazine molecular structure

Combination of
- Amitriptyline: Tricyclic antidepressant
- Perphenazine: Typical antipsychotic

Clinical data
- Trade names: Duo-Vil, Etrafon, Triavil, Triptafen
- AHFS/Drugs.com: Consumer Drug Information
- License data: US DailyMed: e2937445-c015-c9a5-52f8-a2959da97290
- Routes of administration: Oral

Legal status
- Legal status: US: ℞-only

Identifiers
- CAS Number: 8015-22-3
- KEGG: D10294

Amitriptyline/perphenazine (Duo-Vil, Etrafon, Triavil, Triptafen) is a formulation that contains the tricyclic antidepressant amitriptyline and the medium-potency typical (first-generation) antipsychotic, perphenazine. In the United States amitriptyline/perphenazine is marketed by Mylan Pharmaceuticals Inc. and Remedy Repack Inc.

== Medical uses ==
In the United States amitriptyline/perphenazine is indicated for the treatment of patients with:

- Moderate to severe anxiety and/or agitation and depression
- Depression and anxiety in association with chronic physical disease
- Schizophrenia with prominent depressive symptoms

== Adverse effects ==
Common (>1% incidence) adverse effects include

- Sedation
- Hypertension
- Neurological impairments (such as extrapyramidal side effects which include dystonia, akathisia, parkinsonism, muscle rigidity, etc.)
- Anticholinergic side effects such as:

- Blurred vision
- Constipation
- Dry mouth
- Nasal congestion

- Increased appetite
- Weight gain
- Nausea
- Dizziness
- Headache
- Vomiting

Unknown frequency adverse effects include

- Diarrhoea
- Alopecia
- Photophobia
- Pigmentation
- Eczema up to exfoliative dermatitis
- Urticaria
- Erythema
- Itching
- Photosensitivity
- Hypersalivation
- Hyperprolactinaemia — This may present with the following symptoms:

- Galactorrhea
- Gynaecomastia
- Disturbances in menstrual cycle
- Sexual dysfunction

- Pigmentation of the cornea and lens
- Hyperglycaemia
- Hypoglycaemia
- Disturbed concentration
- Excitement
- Anxiety
- Insomnia
- Restlessness
- Nightmares
- Weakness
- Fatigue
- Diaphoresis — excessive/abnormal sweating.

Uncommon/Rare adverse effects include

- Tardive dyskinesia, an often irreversible adverse effect that usually results from chronic use antipsychotic medications, especially the high-potency first-generation antipsychotics. It is characterised by slow (hence tardive), involuntary, repetitive, purposeless muscle movements.
- Neuroleptic malignant syndrome, a potentially fatal complication of antipsychotic drug use. It is characterised by the following symptoms:

- Muscle rigidity
- Tremors
- Mental status change (e.g., hallucinations, agitation, stupor, confusion, etc.)
- Hyperthermia
- Autonomic instability (e.g., tachycardia, high blood pressure, diaphoresis, diarrhoea, etc.)

- Urinary retention
- Blood dyscrasias, e.g., agranulocytosis (a potentially fatal drop in white blood cell count), leukopaenia (a drop in white blood cell counts but not to as extreme an extent as agranulocytosis), neutropaenia (a drop in neutrophil count), thrombocytopaenia (a dangerous drop in platelet counts), eosinophilia (raised eosinophil count), purpura (the appearance of red or purple discolourations of the skin that do not blanch when pressure is applied)
- Hepatitis
- Jaundice
- Pigmentary retinopathy
- Anaphylactoid reactions
- Oedema
- Asthma
- Coma
- Seizures
- Confusional states
- Disorientation
- Incoordination
- Ataxia
- Tremors
- Peripheral neuropathy
- Numbness, tingling and paresthesias of the extremities
- Dysarthria
- Syndrome of inappropriate antidiuretic hormone secretion (SIADH)
- Tinnitus
- Alteration in EEG patterns
- Paralytic ileus
- Hyperpyrexia (elevated body temperature)
- Disturbance of accommodation
- Increased intraocular pressure
- Mydriasis

== Pharmacology ==
Binding affinities (K_{i} [nM]; for human cloned receptors when available)

Molecular target	Amitriptyline	Nortriptyline (Amitriptyline's active metabolite)	Perphenazine	Notes
SERT	3.13	16.5	?	It is this and its NET-inhibiting action is believed to give amitriptyline its antidepressant action.
NET	22.4	4.37	?	See above.
DAT	5380	3100	?	
5-HT_{1A}	450	294	421	Binding for human brain receptors had to be substituted in amitriptyline (AMI) and nortriptyline's (NOR) cases
5-HT_{2A}	4.3	5	5.6	Binding for cloned rat receptors had to be substituted for AMI & NOR. Binding to this receptor is believed to be what gives the newer (atypical) antipsychotics, clozapine, quetiapine, olanzapine, ziprasidone, risperidone, sertindole and zotepine their lower extrapyramidal side effect (EPS) liability.
5-HT_{2C}	6.15	8.5	132	(Binding) As above. This action is believed to be partly responsible for the lower EPS liability of newer antipsychotics and also responsible for their higher weight gain liability compared to most typical antipsychotics.
5-HT_{6}	103	148	17	Cloned rat receptor was substituted for NOR's binding.
5-HT_{7}	114	?	23	Cloned rat receptor was substituted for AMI.
α_{1A}	24	55	10	Human brain receptors were substituted for AMI and NOR.
α_{2A}	690	2030	810.5	As above.
D_{2}	1460	2570	0.16	As above.
D_{3}	206	?	0.13	Human receptors (their source was undefined) had to be substituted for AMI.
H_{1}	1.1	15.1	8	This receptor is at least partly responsible for the sedating effects of these three drugs and hence this combination product. Possibly also partly responsible for their weight gain liability.
M_{1}	12.9	40	1500	This is the main receptor responsible for the anticholinergic side effects mentioned above.
M_{3}	25.9	50	1848	This receptor is believed to be partly responsible for the metabolic adverse effects of the atypical antipsychotics.
σ	300	2000	31.5	All three values are for binding to the guinea pig brain receptors.

== See also ==
- Flupentixol/melitracen
- Olanzapine/fluoxetine
- Tranylcypromine/trifluoperazine
