= JNJ-26489112 =

Chemical compound

Identifiers
- IUPAC name: (S)-N-[(6-Chloro-2,3-dihydrobenzo[1,4]dioxin-2-yl)methyl]sulfamide
- CAS Number: 871824-55-4
- PubChem CID: 11616111
- ChemSpider: 9790860
- UNII: G1TI012DLT
- CompTox Dashboard (EPA): DTXSID601031470

Chemical and physical data
- Formula: C_{9}H_{11}ClN_{2}O_{4}S
- Molar mass: 278.71 g·mol^{−1}
- 3D model (JSmol): Interactive image
- SMILES: NS(=O)(=O)NC[C@H]1COC2=C(O1)C=CC(Cl)=C2
- InChI: InChI=1S/C9H11ClN2O4S/c10-6-1-2-8-9(3-6)15-5-7(16-8)4-12-17(11,13)14/h1-3,7,12H,4-5H2,(H2,11,13,14)/t7-/m0/s1; Key:KXSAIQPPGSSNKX-ZETCQYMHSA-N

JNJ-26489112 is an anticonvulsant drug being developed by Johnson & Johnson for the treatment of epilepsy. JNJ-26489112 was designed as a successor to topiramate. It is expected to have fewer side effects than topiramate because it lacks activity against carbonic anhydrase.

JNJ-26489112 was studied as a treatment for major depressive disorder. This clinical trial was terminated in 2013 due to a "sponsor portfolio decision", and no new development of JNJ-26489112 has been reported.

Its mechanism of action is unknown.

== See also ==
- JNJ-26990990
