= OPC-64005 =

Experimental antidepressant drug

Clinical data
- Other names: OPC64005
- Routes of administration: Oral
- Drug class: Serotonin–norepinephrine–dopamine reuptake inhibitor (triple reuptake inhibitor)

OPC-64005 is a serotonin–norepinephrine–dopamine reuptake inhibitor (SNDRI), or "triple reuptake inhibitor" (TRI), which is under development for the treatment of major depressive disorder. It was also under development for the treatment of attention deficit hyperactivity disorder (ADHD), but development for this indication was discontinued. It is taken by mouth.

As of December 2022, OPC-64005 is in phase 2 clinical trials for major depressive disorder. It reached phase 2 clinical trials for ADHD prior to the discontinuation of its development for this use. It completed a phase 2 clinical trial for ADHD comparing it with placebo and atomoxetine, but the results of this trial were not disclosed. The drug is under development by Otsuka Pharmaceutical. It is a small molecule, but its chemical structure does not appear to have been disclosed.
