= SRX246 =

Chemical compound

Clinical data
- ATC code: None

Identifiers
- IUPAC name: (R)-4-([1,4'-bipiperidin]-1'-yl)-4-oxo-2-((3S,4R)-2-oxo-3-((S)-2-oxo-4-phenyloxazolidin-3-yl)-4-((E)-styryl)azetidin-1-yl)-N-((R)-1-phenylethyl)butanamide
- CAS Number: 512784-93-9
- ChemSpider: 23290398
- UNII: 372X2P22UY

Chemical and physical data
- Formula: C_{42}H_{49}N_{5}O_{5}
- Molar mass: 703.884 g·mol^{−1}
- 3D model (JSmol): Interactive image
- SMILES: O=C1[C@@H](N2C(OC[C@@H]2C3=CC=CC=C3)=O)[C@@H](/C=C/C4=CC=CC=C4)N1[C@@H](C(N[C@H](C)C5=CC=CC=C5)=O)CC(N6CCC(N7CCCCC7)CC6)=O
- InChI: InChI=1S/C42H49N5O5/c1-30(32-16-8-3-9-17-32)43-40(49)36(28-38(48)45-26-22-34(23-27-45)44-24-12-5-13-25-44)46-35(21-20-31-14-6-2-7-15-31)39(41(46)50)47-37(29-52-42(47)51)33-18-10-4-11-19-33/h2-4,6-11,14-21,30,34-37,39H,5,12-13,22-29H2,1H3,(H,43,49)/b21-20+/t30-,35-,36-,37-,39+/m1/s1; Key:FJUKOXWSIGULLE-JVOQCOEYSA-N

SRX246, also known as API-246, is a small-molecule, centrally-active, highly-selective vasopressin V_{1A} receptor antagonist which is under investigation by Azevan Pharmaceuticals for the treatment of affective and anger disorders.

It is an azetidinone derivative, and was developed from LY-307174 as a lead compound. A Phase II activity trial of the drug in the treatment of adults with intermittent explosive disorder showed a reduction in aggression not any higher than that of the placebo. In another Phase II trial it decreased aggression in patients with Huntington's disease, especially those in the middle and late stages who had a history of violent behavior. It was also being studied for the treatment of post-traumatic stress disorder, but the study was terminated due to lack of funding.

== See also ==
- List of investigational anxiolytics
- ABT-436
- Balovaptan
- Nelivaptan
- TS-121
