= Centpropazine =

Experimental antidepressant

Clinical data
- Other names: CPZ; CTZ
- Routes of administration: Oral

Identifiers
- IUPAC name: 1-[4-[2-hydroxy-3-(4-phenylpiperazin-1-yl)propoxy]phenyl]propan-1-one
- CAS Number: 91315-34-3
- PubChem CID: 118176
- ChemSpider: 105612
- UNII: R5YPG9LA47
- ChEMBL: ChEMBL4303166
- CompTox Dashboard (EPA): DTXSID00919825

Chemical and physical data
- Formula: C_{22}H_{28}N_{2}O_{3}
- Molar mass: 368.477 g·mol^{−1}
- 3D model (JSmol): Interactive image
- SMILES: CCC(=O)C1=CC=C(C=C1)OCC(CN2CCN(CC2)C3=CC=CC=C3)O
- InChI: InChI=1S/C22H28N2O3/c1-2-22(26)18-8-10-21(11-9-18)27-17-20(25)16-23-12-14-24(15-13-23)19-6-4-3-5-7-19/h3-11,20,25H,2,12-17H2,1H3; Key:ZQPXSRTZFYHSFB-UHFFFAOYSA-N

Centpropazine (CPZ, CTZ) is an experimental antidepressant of the phenylpiperazine family which was under development for the treatment of major depressive disorder in India but was never marketed. It is described as having imipramine-like clinical effects, reversing reserpine-induced effects in animals, and potentiating amphetamine-induced effects in animals. The mechanism of action of centpropazine is unknown. The drug reached phase 3 clinical trials prior to the discontinuation of its development. It was first described in the scientific literature by 1980.

Chemical structures of centpropazine and analogues
Centpropazine

Centpyraquin (IHCH-7162)

IHCH-7179

== See also ==
- IHCH-7162 (centpyraquin)
