= BI 1358894 =

Investigational antidepressant compound

Legal status
- Legal status: Investigational

Identifiers
- CAS Number: 2971025-50-8

BI 1358894 is an investigational antidepressant that works as a transient receptor potential cation channel inhibitor. It is developed by Boehringer Ingelheim. As of 2025, it is in Phase II clinical trials for the treatment of borderline personality disorder.
