= AN-788 =

Chemical compound

Clinical data
- Other names: AN788; NSD-788; NSD788; IP-2018; IP2018
- Drug class: Monoamine reuptake inhibitor; Serotonin–dopamine reuptake inhibitor

Identifiers
- CAS Number: 1618658-43-7

AN-788, also known as NSD-788 and IP-2018, is an experimental drug which was originated by NeuroSearch and is under development by Saniona for the treatment of major depressive disorder. It was also under development for anxiety disorders, but development for this indication was discontinued. The drug acts as a serotonin–dopamine reuptake inhibitor (SDRI). As of November of 2018, it is in an agreement for phase II clinical trials for major depressive disorder. As of September 2022, no recent development has been reported for major depressive disorder, but the drug is now in phase 2 clinical trials for erectile dysfunction.

== See also ==
- List of investigational antidepressants
- List of investigational sexual dysfunction drugs
