= SB-247853 =

Clinical data
- Other names: SB247853
- Routes of administration: Unknown/unspecified (but orally active)
- Drug class: Serotonin 5-HT_{2C} receptor inverse agonist
- ATC code: None

Identifiers
- IUPAC name: 5-methyl-N-[6-(pyridin-2-ylmethoxy)-3-pyridinyl]-6-(trifluoromethyl)-2,3-dihydroindole-1-carboxamide
- CAS Number: 200711-10-0
- PubChem CID: 9888804
- ChemSpider: 8064476
- UNII: JBJ4VCT98Y
- ChEMBL: ChEMBL54719

Chemical and physical data
- Formula: C_{22}H_{19}F_{3}N_{4}O_{2}
- Molar mass: 428.415 g·mol^{−1}
- 3D model (JSmol): Interactive image
- SMILES: CC1=CC2=C(C=C1C(F)(F)F)N(CC2)C(=O)NC3=CN=C(C=C3)OCC4=CC=CC=N4
- InChI: InChI=1S/C22H19F3N4O2/c1-14-10-15-7-9-29(19(15)11-18(14)22(23,24)25)21(30)28-16-5-6-20(27-12-16)31-13-17-4-2-3-8-26-17/h2-6,8,10-12H,7,9,13H2,1H3,(H,28,30); Key:KLAHZRONIHBPPB-UHFFFAOYSA-N

SB-247853 is a highly selective serotonin 5-HT_{2C} receptor inverse agonist which was under development for the treatment of major depressive disorder but was never marketed.

Its affinities (K_{i}) were found to be 0.50 nM for the serotonin 5-HT_{2C} receptor, 60 nM for the serotonin 5-HT_{2B} receptor, and 1,300 nM for the serotonin 5-HT_{2A} receptor. Hence, it shows 120-fold selectivity for the serotonin 5-HT_{2C} receptor over the serotonin 5-HT_{2B} receptor and 2,600-fold selectivity for the serotonin 5-HT_{2C} receptor over the serotonin 5-HT_{2A} receptor. The drug reverses the hypolocomotion induced by the serotonin 5-HT_{2C} receptor agonist meta-chlorophenylpiperazine (mCPP) in rodents. It is orally active.

The drug produced orthostatic intolerance in healthy human volunteers during the first dose-escalation clinical study. Subsequently, it was found to cause substantial hypotension (low blood pressure) and presyncope (pre-fainting symptoms) in the tilt table test. It was concluded based on these findings that the serotonin 5-HT_{2C} receptor is involved in regulating the cardiovascular system.

SB-247853 was first described in the scientific literature by 2000. It was developed by GlaxoSmithKline. The drug reached phase 1 clinical trials prior to the discontinuation of its development in 2005.

== See also ==
- Serotonin 5-HT_{2C} receptor antagonist
- List of investigational antidepressants
