= Hypidone =

Investigational antidepressant drug

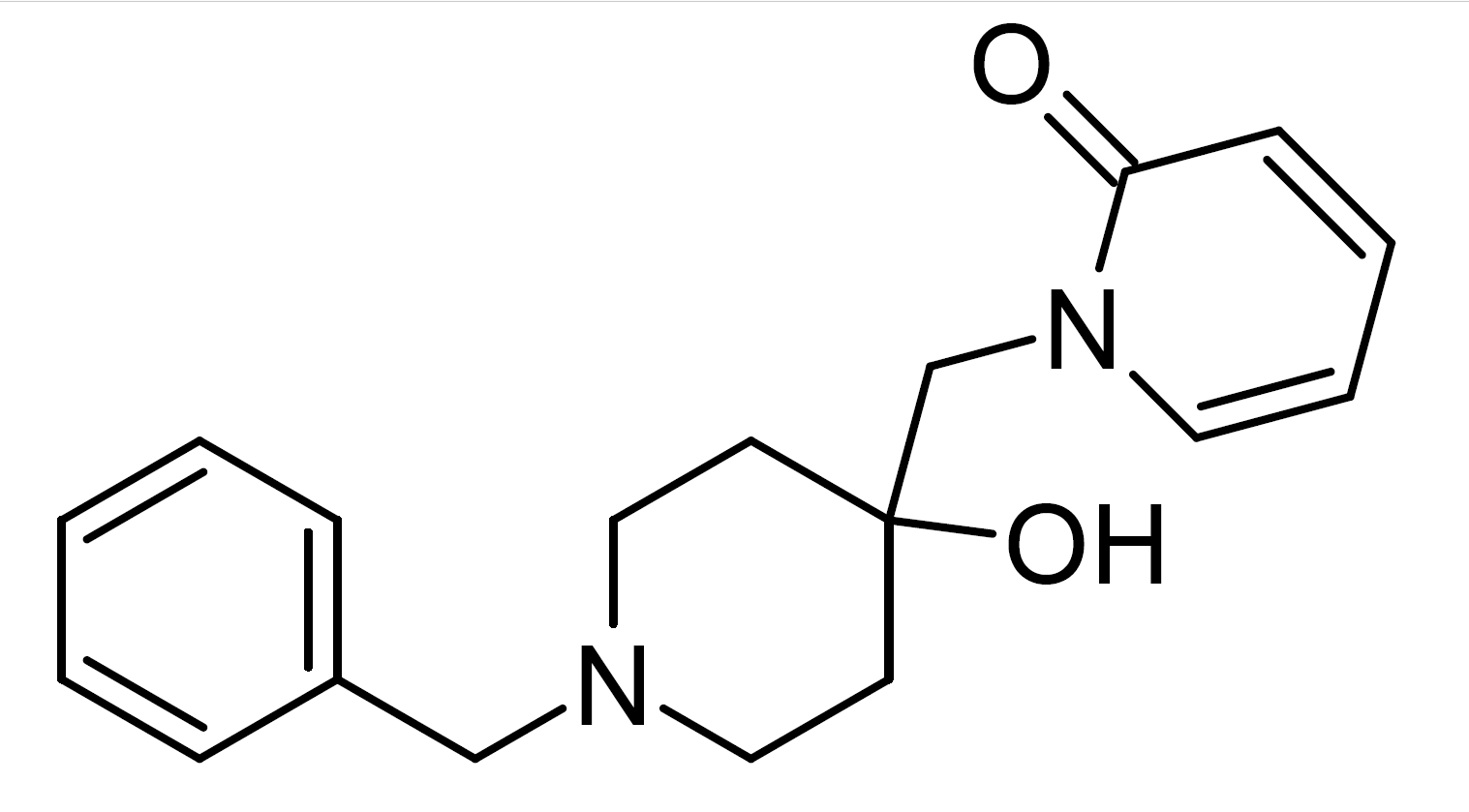

Clinical data
- Other names: YL-0919; YL0919

Identifiers
- IUPAC name: 1-[(1-benzyl-4-hydroxypiperidin-4-yl)methyl]pyridin-2-one
- CAS Number: 1339339-18-2 1339058-04-6 (HCl)
- PubChem CID: 54673543
- ChemSpider: 68055492

Chemical and physical data
- Formula: C_{18}H_{22}N_{2}O_{2}
- Molar mass: 298.386 g·mol^{−1}
- 3D model (JSmol): Interactive image
- SMILES: C1CN(CCC1(CN2C=CC=CC2=O)O)CC3=CC=CC=C3
- InChI: InChI=1S/C18H22N2O2/c21-17-8-4-5-11-20(17)15-18(22)9-12-19(13-10-18)14-16-6-2-1-3-7-16/h1-8,11,22H,9-10,12-15H2; Key:BGMVOROUOUVVRV-UHFFFAOYSA-N

Hypidone (developmental code name YL-0919) is an investigational serotonergic antidepressant which is under development for the treatment of major depressive disorder. It acts as a serotonin reuptake inhibitor, 5-HT_{1A} receptor partial agonist, and 5-HT_{6} receptor full agonist. It is used as the hydrochloride salt. As of January 2021, hypidone is in phase 2 clinical trials for major depressive disorder.

== See also ==
- List of investigational antidepressants
