= TGBA01AD =

Investigational antidepressant drug

Clinical data
- Other names: FKB01MD
- Routes of administration: By mouth

Pharmacokinetic data
- Bioavailability: 17%
- Elimination half-life: 4 hours

TGBA01AD (also known as FKB01MD) is a serotonin reuptake inhibitor, 5-HT_{1A} and 5-HT_{1D} receptor agonist, and 5-HT_{2} receptor antagonist which is under development by Fabre-Kramer for the treatment of major depressive disorder. It has been in phase II clinical trials since 2009, and as of January 2016, remains in this phase of development.

== See also ==
- List of investigational antidepressants
