= Serotonin–dopamine reuptake inhibitor =

Class of drug

Chemical structure of the monoamine and indole neurotransmitter serotonin.

Chemical structure of the monoamine and catecholamine neurotransmitter dopamine.

A serotonin–dopamine reuptake inhibitor (SDRI) is a type of drug which acts as a reuptake inhibitor of the monoamine neurotransmitters serotonin and dopamine by blocking the actions of the serotonin transporter (SERT) and dopamine transporter (DAT), respectively. This in turn leads to increased extracellular concentrations of serotonin and dopamine, and, therefore, an increase in serotonergic and dopaminergic neurotransmission.

A closely related type of drug is a serotonin–dopamine releasing agent (SDRA).

== Comparison to SNDRIs ==
Relative to serotonin–norepinephrine–dopamine reuptake inhibitors (SNDRIs), which also inhibit the reuptake of norepinephrine in addition to serotonin and dopamine, SDRIs might be expected to have a reduced incidence of certain side effects, namely insomnia, appetite loss, anxiety, and heart rate and blood pressure changes.

== Examples of SDRIs ==
Unlike the case of other combination monoamine reuptake inhibitors such as serotonin–norepinephrine reuptake inhibitors (SNRIs) and norepinephrine–dopamine reuptake inhibitors (NDRIs), on account of the very similar chemical structures of their substrates, it is exceptionally difficult to tease apart affinity for the DAT from the norepinephrine transporter (NET) and inhibit the reuptake of dopamine alone. As a result, selective dopamine reuptake inhibitors (DRIs) are rare, and comparably, SDRIs are even more so.

=== Pharmaceutical drugs ===
Medifoxamine (Cledial, Gerdaxyl) is an antidepressant that appears to act as an SDRI as well as a 5-HT_{2} receptor antagonist. Sibutramine (Reductil, Meridia, Siredia, Sibutrex) is a withdrawn anorectic that itself as a molecule in vitro is an SNDRI but preferentially an SDRI, with 18.3- and 5.8-fold preference for inhibiting the reuptake of serotonin and dopamine over norepinephrine, respectively. However, the metabolites of sibutramine are substantially more potent and possess different ratios of monoamine reuptake inhibition in comparison, and sibutramine appears to be acting in vivo mainly as a prodrug to them; accordingly, it was found to act as an SNRI (73% and 54% for norepinephrine and serotonin reuptake inhibition, respectively) in human volunteers with only very weak inhibition of dopamine reuptake (16%).

==== Sertraline ====
Sertraline (Zoloft) is a selective serotonin reuptake inhibitor (SSRI), but, uniquely among most antidepressants, it shows relatively high (nanomolar) affinity for the DAT as well. As such, it has been suggested that clinically it may weakly inhibit the reuptake of dopamine, particularly at high dosages. For this reason, sertraline has sometimes been described as an SDRI. This is relevant as dopamine is thought to be involved in the pathophysiology of depression, and increased dopaminergic signaling by sertraline in addition to serotonin may have additional benefits against depression.

Tatsumi et al. (1997) found K_{i} values of sertraline at the SERT, DAT, and NET of 0.29, 25, and 420 nM, respectively. The selectivity of sertraline for the SERT over the DAT was 86-fold. In any case, of the wide assortment of antidepressants assessed in the study, sertraline showed the highest affinity of them all for the DAT, even higher than the norepinephrine–dopamine reuptake inhibitors (NDRIs) nomifensine (K_{i} = 56 nM) and bupropion (K_{i} = 520 nM). Sertraline is also said to have similar affinity for the DAT as the NDRI methylphenidate. It is notable that tametraline (CP-24,441), a very close analogue of sertraline and the compound from which sertraline was originally derived, is an NDRI that was never marketed.

Single doses of 50 to 200 mg sertraline have been found to result in peak plasma concentrations of 20 to 55 ng/mL (65–180 nM), while chronic treatment with 200 mg/day sertraline, the maximum recommended dosage, has been found to result in maximal plasma levels of 118 to 166 ng/mL (385–542 nM). However, sertraline is highly protein-bound in plasma, with a bound fraction of 98.5%. Hence, only 1.5% is free and theoretically bioactive. Based on this percentage, free concentrations of sertraline would be 2.49 ng/mL (8.13 nM) at the very most, which is only about one-third of the K_{i} value that Tatsumi et al. found with sertraline at the DAT. A very high dosage of sertraline of 400 mg/day has been found to produce peak plasma concentrations of about 250 ng/mL (816 nM). This can be estimated to result in a free concentration of 3.75 ng/mL (12.2 nM), which is still only about half of the K_{i} of sertraline for the DAT.

As such, it seems unlikely that sertraline would produce much inhibition of dopamine reuptake even at clinically used dosages well in excess of the recommended maximum clinical dosage. This is in accordance with its 86-fold selectivity for the SERT over the DAT and hence the fact that nearly 100-fold higher levels of sertraline would be necessary to also inhibit dopamine reuptake. In accordance, while sertraline has very low abuse potential and may even be aversive at clinical dosages, a case report of sertraline abuse described dopaminergic-like effects such as euphoria, mental overactivity, and hallucinations only at a dosage 56 times the normal maximum and 224 times the normal minimum. For these reasons, significant inhibition of dopamine reuptake by sertraline at clinical dosages is controversial, and occupation by sertraline of the DAT is thought by many experts to not be clinically relevant.

=== Research chemicals ===
Compound 16b. The opposite enantiomer is ent-16b. (Manning 2009)

Two SDRIs that are known in research at present are RTI-83 and UWA-101, though other related compounds are also known. Manning et al. presented two high-affinity MAT-ligands with good binding selectivity for SERT and DAT, namely the 4-indolyl and 1-naphthyl arylalkylamines ent-16b (K_{i} 0.82, 3.8, 4840 nM for SERT, DAT, NET) and ent-13b respectively. AN-788 (NSD-788) is another SDRI, and has been under development for the treatment of depressive and anxiety disorders.

== See also ==
- Monoamine reuptake inhibitor
- Dopamine reuptake inhibitor
- Serotonin reuptake inhibitor
