= MIN-117 =

Chemical compound

Clinical data
- Other names: WF-516

Identifiers
- IUPAC name: (2S)-1-[4-(3,4-Dichlorophenyl)piperidin-1-yl]-3-[2-(5-methyl-1,3,4-oxadiazol-2-yl)benzo[b]furan-4-yloxy]propan-2-ol
- CAS Number: 310392-94-0
- PubChem CID: 9806065
- ChemSpider: 7981825
- UNII: QM05G7NM4H

Chemical and physical data
- Formula: C_{25}H_{25}Cl_{2}N_{3}O
- Molar mass: 454.40 g·mol^{−1}
- 3D model (JSmol): Interactive image
- SMILES: CC1=NN=C(O1)C2=CC3=C(O2)C=CC=C3OC[C@H](CN4CCC(CC4)C5=CC(=C(C=C5)Cl)Cl)O
- InChI: InChI=1S/C25H25Cl2N3O4/c1-15-28-29-25(33-15)24-12-19-22(3-2-4-23(19)34-24)32-14-18(31)13-30-9-7-16(8-10-30)17-5-6-20(26)21(27)11-17/h2-6,11-12,16,18,31H,7-10,13-14H2,1H3/t18-/m0/s1; Key:XIYDIPLATGRHEC-SFHVURJKSA-N

MIN-117 (known formerly as WF-516) is an investigational antidepressant which is under development by Minerva Neurosciences for the clinical treatment of major depressive disorder (MDD). It is described as a 5-HT_{1A} and 5-HT_{2A} receptor antagonist and inhibitor of serotonin and dopamine reuptake, and is also reported to possess affinity for the α_{1A}- and α_{1B}-adrenergic receptors. As of May 2015, MIN-117 is in phase II clinical trials for MDD. In December 2019, Minerva announced that MIN-117 was no longer in clinical development for MDD after disappointing results in a phase IIb trial.

== See also ==
- List of investigational antidepressants
