= Olanzapine/fluoxetine =

Antidepressant medication

Combination of
- Olanzapine: Atypical antipsychotic
- Fluoxetine: Selective serotonin reuptake inhibitor

Clinical data
- Trade names: Symbyax, Cinol Forte, Olapin Forte, others
- AHFS/Drugs.com: Professional Drug Facts
- License data: US DailyMed: Olanzapine_and_fluoxetine
- Pregnancy category: AU: C
- Routes of administration: By mouth
- ATC code: N06CA03 (WHO)

Legal status
- Legal status: US: ℞-only

Identifiers
- CAS Number: 250603-12-4
- KEGG: D10206

Olanzapine/fluoxetine (trade name Symbyax, created by Eli Lilly and Company) is a fixed-dose combination medication containing olanzapine (Zyprexa), an atypical antipsychotic, and fluoxetine (Prozac), a selective serotonin reuptake inhibitor (SSRI). Olanzapine/fluoxetine is primarily used to treat the depressive episodes of bipolar I disorder as well as treatment-resistant depression.

== Medical uses ==
Olanzapine/fluoxetine was approved by the U.S. Food and Drug Administration (FDA) to treat the depressive episodes of bipolar I disorder in 2003. In 2009, it was granted approval for the treatment of treatment-resistant depression.

Olanzapine/fluoxetine, or other antidepressant/antipsychotic combinations, are sometimes prescribed off-label for anxiety disorders, eating disorders, obsessive–compulsive disorder (OCD), and posttraumatic stress disorder (PTSD).

== Side effects ==
Possible side effects of olanzapine/fluoxetine include all those of the two component drugs: olanzapine (side effects) and fluoxetine (side effects). Common side effects include suicidal thoughts, increased appetite, weight gain, drowsiness, fatigue, dry mouth, swelling, tremor, blurred vision, and difficulty concentrating.

Olanzapine/fluoxetine could produce a severe allergic reaction and should not be used if the patient has previously experienced an allergic reaction to either fluoxetine or olanzapine.

Olanzapine is correlated with an increase in blood sugar. Patients with diabetes, or those at risk for developing it, require careful monitoring.

In rare cases, olanzapine/fluoxetine may cause neuroleptic malignant syndrome.

Like other SSRIs, olanzapine/fluoxetine carries a boxed warning stating that it could increase the risk of suicidal thoughts and behaviors in patients aged 24 and under. The warning also states that olanzapine/fluoxetine may increase the risk of death in elderly patients with dementia-related psychosis.

== See also ==
- Amitriptyline/perphenazine
- Aripiprazole/sertraline
- Flupentixol/melitracen
- Tranylcypromine/trifluoperazine
