= Vasopressin receptor 1B =

Protein found in humans

AVPR1B

Identifiers
- Aliases: AVPR1B, AVPR3, arginine vasopressin receptor 1B, V1bR, VPR3, vasopressin 3 receptor, antidiuretic hormone receptor 1B
- External IDs: OMIM: 600264; MGI: 1347010; GeneCards: AVPR1B

Gene location (Human)
Chr.	Chromosome 1 (human)
Band	1q32.1	Start	206,106,936 bp
Band	1q32.1	End	206,117,699 bp

Gene location (Mouse)
Chr.	Chromosome 1 (mouse)
Band	1|1 E4	Start	131,526,977 bp
Band	1|1 E4	End	131,539,738 bp
RNA expression pattern
Bgee	Human / Mouse (ortholog); Top expressed in: anterior pituitary; endothelial cell; secondary oocyte; islet of Langerhans; gonad; visceral pleura; duodenum; metanephros; embryo; ganglionic eminence / Top expressed in: tail of embryo; embryo; blastocyst; embryo; meninges; spinal cord; hippocampus proper; vasculature; thalamus; islet of Langerhans; More reference expression data
BioGPS	n/a
Gene ontology
Molecular function	peptide binding; G protein-coupled receptor activity; signal transducer activity; protein kinase C binding; vasopressin receptor activity
Cellular component	integral component of membrane; endosome; plasma membrane; integral component of plasma membrane; membrane
Biological process	positive regulation of cytosolic calcium ion concentration; G protein-coupled receptor signaling pathway; regulation of systemic arterial blood pressure by vasopressin; cellular response to hormone stimulus; activation of phospholipase C activity; positive regulation of vasoconstriction; signal transduction; response to peptide
Sources:Amigo / QuickGO
Orthologs
Databases	NCBI: entry; OMA: entry
Species	Human	Mouse
Entrez	553	26361
Ensembl	ENSG00000198049	ENSMUSG00000026432
UniProt	P47901	Q9WU02
RefSeq (mRNA)	NM_000707	NM_011924
RefSeq (protein)	NP_000698	NP_036054
Location (UCSC)	Chr 1: 206.11 – 206.12 Mb	Chr 1: 131.53 – 131.54 Mb
PubMed search
- Wikidata
View/Edit Human	View/Edit Mouse

Vasopressin V1b receptor (V1BR) also known as vasopressin 3 receptor (VPR3) or antidiuretic hormone receptor 1B is a protein that in humans is encoded by the AVPR1B (arginine vasopressin receptor 1B) gene.

V1BR acts as a receptor for vasopressin. AVPR1B belongs to the subfamily of G protein-coupled receptors. Its activity is mediated by G proteins which stimulate a phosphatidylinositol-calcium second messenger system. It is a major contributor to homeostasis and the control of water, glucose, and salts in the blood. Arginine vasopressin has four receptors, each of which are located in different tissues and have specific functions. AVPR1b is a G protein-coupled pituitary receptor that has only recently been characterized because of its rarity.

It has been found that the 420-amino-acid sequence of the AVPR1B receptor shared the most overall similarities with the AVP1A, AVP2 and oxytocin receptors. AVPR1B maps to chromosome region 1q32 and is a member of the vasopressin/oxytocin family subfamily.

== Tissue distribution ==
AVPR1B was initially described as a novel vasopressin receptor located in the anterior pituitary, where it stimulates ACTH release. Subsequent studies have shown that it is also present in the brain and some peripheral tissues.

== Clinical significance ==
=== Behavioral ===
Inactivation of the Avpr1b gene in mice (knockout) produces mice with greatly reduced aggression and a reduced ability to recognize recently investigated mice. Defensive behaviour and predatory behaviours appear normal in these knockout mice, but there is evidence that social motivation or awareness is reduced. The AVPR1B antagonist, SSR149415, has been shown to have anti-aggressive actions in hamsters and anti-depressant- and anxiety (anxiolytic)-like behaviors in rats. A single nucleotide polymorphism (SNP) has been associated with susceptibility to depression in humans.

=== Metabolic ===
Various stress-induced elevations of ACTH are blunted in the Avpr1b knockout mouse.

=== Oncology ===
AVPR1B is expressed at high levels in ACTH-secreting pituitary adenomas as well as in bronchial carcinoids responsible for the ectopic ACTH syndrome.

== Ligands ==
Nelivaptan (SSR149415) and D-[Leu^{4}-Lys^{8}]-vasopressin are a specific antagonist and agonist for the vasopressin 1b receptor, respectively.

== Function ==
AVPR1B is found in different parts of the body and thus has several influences and regulatory actions. Arginine vasopressin influences several symptoms related to affective disorders including significant memory processes, pain sensitivity, synchronization of biological rhythms and the timing and quality of REM sleep. Studies have shown that AVPR1B deficiencies produce behavioral changes that can be reversed when the peptide is replaced. These effects are expressed through contact with specific plasma membrane receptors. AVPR1B is responsible for fueling the effects of vasopressin on ACTH release. This interaction takes place as Arginine Vasopressin works with corticotropin releasing hormone to stimulate the pituitary gland to secrete ACTH. AVPR1b is then responsible for mediating the stimulatory effect of vasopressin on ACTH release. Several G proteins are also involved in the signal transduction pathways linked with AVPR1B. These relationships depend on the level of receptor expression and concentration of vasopressin. For example, AVPR1B causes secretion of ACTH from the anterior pituitary cells in a dose-dependent relationship by activating protein kinase C via the Gq/11 protein.

== Application ==
There have been several experiments which have studied these interactions further and revealed AVPR1B's role in psychological disorders and regulatory functions. Haplotypes of AVPR1B are associated with increased protective effects to recurrent major depression. AVPR1B has also been associated with higher cortisol responses to psychosocial stress in children with psychiatric disorders compared with carriers of glucocorticoid receptor gene. AVPR1b has also shown involvement in regulation of brain water content and cerebral edema. This was revealed as increased levels of AVPR1B mRNA on the choroid plexus were discovered as a result of increased plasma osmolality. The increase after a reduction of brain water content from salt water loading indicated AVPR1B's role in the neuroendocrine feedback loop in maintaining normal central nervous system fluid balance.
