= Balovaptan =

Chemical compound

Clinical data
- Other names: RG7314
- ATC code: None

Identifiers
- IUPAC name: 8-Chloro-5-methyl-1-(4-pyridin-2-yloxycyclohexyl)-4,6-dihydro-[1,2,4]triazolo[4,3-a][1,4]benzodiazepine
- CAS Number: 1228088-30-9
- PubChem CID: 46200932
- DrugBank: DB14823
- ChemSpider: 59718648
- UNII: RAX5D5AGV6
- KEGG: D11476

Chemical and physical data
- Formula: C_{22}H_{24}ClN_{5}O
- Molar mass: 409.92 g·mol^{−1}
- 3D model (JSmol): Interactive image
- SMILES: CN1CC2=NN=C([C@H]3CC[C@@H](CC3)OC3=CC=CC=N3)N2C2=C(C1)C=C(Cl)C=C2
- InChI: InChI=1S/C22H24ClN5O/c1-27-13-16-12-17(23)7-10-19(16)28-20(14-27)25-26-22(28)15-5-8-18(9-6-15)29-21-4-2-3-11-24-21/h2-4,7,10-12,15,18H,5-6,8-9,13-14H2,1H3/t15-,18-; Key:GMPZPHGHNDMRKL-RZDIXWSQSA-N

Balovaptan (INN; developmental code name RG7314), is a selective small molecule antagonist of the vasopressin V_{1A} receptor which is under development by Roche for the treatment of post-traumatic stress disorder (PTSD).

== Research ==
=== Post-traumatic stress disorder ===
It was in a phase III clinical trial for adults and a phase II clinical trial for children for post-traumatic stress disorder.

=== Autism ===
In January 2018, Roche announced that the US Food and Drug Administration (FDA) had granted breakthrough therapy designation for balovaptan in people with autism spectrum disorder (ASD). The FDA granted this based on the results of the adult phase II clinical trial called VANILLA (Vasopressin ANtagonist to Improve sociaL communication in Autism) study.

The phase III study concluded that balovaptan did not improve social communication in autistic adults.

=== Stroke ===
It was also in phase II studies for the treatment of stroke. However, it has since been discontinued for both of those indications.
