= List of investigational anxiety disorder drugs =

Investigational anxiety disorder drugs

This is a list of investigational anxiety disorder drugs, or drugs that are currently under development for clinical use in the treatment of anxiety disorders (type unspecified) but are not yet approved.

Chemical/generic names are listed first, with developmental code names, synonyms, and brand names in parentheses. The format of list items is "Name (Synonyms) – Mechanism of Action [Reference]".

This list was last comprehensively updated in September 2025. It is likely to become outdated with time.

== Under development ==
=== Phase 3 ===
- Lysergic acid diethylamide (LSD; lysergide; MM-120; MM120) – non-selective serotonin receptor agonist and psychedelic hallucinogen
- Ranquilon (6-phenylhexanoyl)glycyl-L-tryptophan amide; GB-115) – cholecystokinin (CCK) receptor antagonist
- Soclenicant (BNC-210; BNC210; IW-2143;) – α_{7}-nicotinic acetylcholine receptor negative allosteric modulator

=== Phase 2 ===
- BAER-101 (AZ-7325; AZD-7325) – selective GABA_{A} α_{2} and α_{3} subunit-containing receptor positive allosteric modulator and nonbenzodiazepine/cinnoline
- Brexanolone caprilcerbate (Glyph Allopregnanolone; GlyphAllo; LYT-300; SPT-300; allopregnanolone prodrug) – GABA_{A} receptor positive allosteric modulator and neurosteroid (brexanolone prodrug)
- Cannabidiol (CBD; Arvisol) – cannabinoid receptor modulator and other actions
- Cenobamate (ONO-2017; Ontozry; X-Copri; Xcopri; YKP-3089) – atypical voltage-gated sodium channel blocker and GABA_{A} receptor positive allosteric modulator
- ENX-102 (ENX102) — α_{2}, α_{3}, and α_{5} subunit-containing GABA_{A} receptor positive allosteric modulator and nonbenzodiazepine
- JNJ-42165279 (JNJ-5279) – fatty acid amide hydrolase (FAAH) inhibitor
- Maritupirdine (CD-008-0045) – serotonin 5-HT_{6} receptor antagonist
- Psilocybin low dose (APEX-52) – non-selective serotonin receptor agonist and psychedelic hallucinogen
- Vortioxetine (Brintellix; Lu-AA21004; trintellix; Vortidif) – serotonin reuptake inhibitor, serotonin 5-HT_{1A} and 5-HT_{1B} receptor agonist, and serotonin 5-HT_{1D}, 5-HT_{3}, and 5-HT_{7} receptor antagonist
- Zuranolone (BIIB-125; S-812217; SAGE-217; SGE-797; Zurzuvae) – GABA_{A} receptor positive allosteric modulator and neurosteroid

=== Phase 1 ===
- Etifoxine deuterated (deuterated etifoxine; GRX-917) – GABA_{A} receptor positive allosteric modulator, translocator protein (TSPO) agonist, and nonbenzodiazepine/benzoxazine
- KAR-2618 (GFB-887; TRPC4/5 inhibitor) – transient receptor potential TRPC4 and TRPC5 cation channel inhibitor
- SNTX-2643 (SENS-01) – atypical serotonin reuptake inhibitor (SRI) (kanna-derived)
- Transient receptor potential channel 4/5 inhibitor - Bristol-Myers Squibb – transient receptor potential TRPC4 and TRPC5 cation channel inhibitor

=== Preclinical ===
- EB-002 (EB-373; psilocin prodrug) – non-selective serotonin receptor agonist and psychedelic hallucinogen
- Midomafetamine (MDMA; ecstasy) microneedle patch – serotonin–norepinephrine–dopamine releasing agent, weak serotonin 5-HT_{2} receptor agonist, and entactogen
- Nerinetide (NA-1; Tat-NR2B9c) – PDZ domain inhibitor
- OV-4041 – potassium–chloride-cotransporter agonist
- PSIL-025 – serotonin 5-HT_{1} receptor modulator

=== Phase unknown ===
- INV-407 – undefined mechanism of action

== Not under development ==
=== No development reported ===
- ACH-36 – undefined mechanism of action
- Alprazolam sublingual – GABA_{A} receptor positive allosteric modulator and benzodiazepine
- Antalarmin (CP-154526) – corticotropin-releasing hormone (CRH) inhibitor
- Buspirone controlled release (Buspirone ER) – serotonin 5-HT_{1A} receptor partial agonist and other actions
- BW-723C86 – serotonin 5-HT_{2B} and 5-HT_{2C} receptor agonist
- Cannabidiol dry powder inhalation (RLS-103) – cannabinoid receptor modulator and other actions
- Darigabat (CVL-865; PF-06372865; PF-6372865) – GABA_{A} receptor positive allosteric modulator
- Divaplon (RU-32698) – GABA_{A} receptor positive allosteric modulator and nonbenzodiazepine/imidazolpyrimidine
- Fananserin (RP-62203) – serotonin 5-HT_{2A} receptor antagonist and dopamine D_{4} receptor antagonist
- FR260010 (FR-260010) – serotonin 5-HT_{2C} receptor antagonist
- GSK-588045 (GSK588045) – serotonin 5-HT_{1A}, 5-HT_{1B}, and 5-HT_{1D} receptor antagonist
- GSK-1360707 – serotonin–norepinephrine–dopamine reuptake inhibitor (SNDRI)
- GT-001 – GABA_{A} receptor positive allosteric modulator
- Guanfacine extended release (Connexyn; Intuniv; Intuniv XR; S-877503; SHP-503; SPD-503) – α_{2}-adrenergic receptor agonist
- Itriglumide (CR-2945) – cholecystokinin B (CCK_{B}) receptor antagonist
- Lohocla-201 (Kindolor) – various actions
- LY-293284 – serotonin 5-HT_{1A} receptor agonist
- NMRA-511 (BTRX-323511; NMRA-323511) – vasopressin V_{1A} receptor antagonist
- Paroxetine (Aropax; BRL-29060; Deroxat; Divarius; FG-7051; Frosinor; Motivan; NNC-207051; Paxil; Seroxat; SI-211103; Tagonis) – selective serotonin reuptake inhibitor (SSRI)
- Psilocybin (MYCO-001; MYCO-003) – non-selective serotonin receptor agonist and psychedelic hallucinogen
- PT-00114 (PT100114) – corticotropin-releasing hormone (CRH) inhibitor
- Research programme: allosteric modulators - Addex Therapeutics – various actions
- Research programme: AMPA receptor agonists - RespireRx (ampakines; CX compounds) – AMPA receptor agonists and brain-derived neurotrophic factor (BDNF) stimulants
- Research programme: anxiety and neurological disorder therapeutics - AstraZeneca – various actions
- Research programme: cannabis-based therapeutics - Skye Bioscience – cannabinoid receptor agonists
- Research programme: neuropeptide S receptor modulators - Pfizer (WYE-198232) – neuropeptide receptor agonists
- Research programme: oxytocin receptor agonist - Wyeth – oxytocin receptor agonists
- RGH-618 – metabotropic glutamate mGlu_{5} receptor negative allosteric modulator
- Riluzole (PK-26124; Rilutek; RP-54274) – various actions
- Risperidone (JNJ-410397-AAA; R-64766; R064766; Risperdal; Risperdal Consta; Risperdal Depot) – atypical antipsychotic (non-selective monoamine receptor modulator)
- Saripidem (SL-850274) – GABA_{A} receptor positive allosteric modulator and nonbenzodiazepine/imidazopyridine
- SB-242084 (SB242084) – serotonin 5-HT_{2C} receptor antagonist
- SRX-246 (API-246) – vasopressin V_{1A} receptor antagonist
- SYT-510 – anandamide reuptake inhibitor
- Tebideutorexant (JNJ-3215; JNJ-61393215; Orexin-1) – orexin OX_{1} receptor antagonist
- WAY-100135 – serotonin 5-HT_{1A} receptor antagonist
- Ziprasidone (CP-88059-01; CP-88059-1; Geodon; ME-2112; RQ-00000003; Zeldox) – atypical antipsychotic (non-selective monoamine receptor modulator)

=== Discontinued ===
- 1-Amino-5-bromouracil (ABU) – undefined mechanism of action
- ABT-418 – nicotinic acetylcholine receptor agonist
- ABT-436 – vasopressin V_{1B} receptor antagonist
- Adipiplon (NG-273) – GABA_{A} receptor positive allosteric modulator and nonbenzodiazepine
- Alnespirone (S-20499) – serotonin 5-HT_{1A} receptor agonist
- Alosetron (GR-68755; GR-68755C; Lotronex) – serotonin 5-HT_{3} receptor antagonist
- Alpidem (Ananxyl; S-800342-001; SL-800342) – GABA_{A} receptor positive allosteric modulator and nonbenzodiazepine/imidazopyridine
- Alprazolam lingual spray – GABA_{A} receptor positive allosteric modulator and benzodiazepine
- AN-788 (IP-2018; NSD788) – serotonin–dopamine reuptake inhibitor (SDRI)
- AP-521 – serotonin 5-HT_{1A} receptor partial agonist
- Aprepitant (Emend; L-754030; MK-0869; MK-869; ONO-7436) – neurokinin NK_{1} receptor antagonist
- AVN-211 (CD-008-0173) – serotonin 5-HT_{6} receptor antagonist
- AVN-397 – undefined mechanism of action
- AZD-2327 – δ-opioid receptor (DOR) agonist
- AZD-8129 (AR-A000002; AR-A2XX; AR-A2) – serotonin 5-HT_{1B} receptor antagonist
- Befloxatone (MD-370503) – reversible inhibitor of monoamine oxidase A (RIMA)
- Blarcamesine (AE-37; ANA001; ANAVEX 2-73) – sigma σ_{1} receptor agonist, muscarinic acetylcholine M_{1} receptor agonist, and ionotropic glutamate NMDA receptor agonist
- Bretazenil (RO-166028) – GABA_{A} receptor positive allosteric modulator and benzodiazepine
- Brofaromine (Brofaremine; CGP-11305A; Consonar; Consonev) – reversible inhibitor of monoamine oxidase A (RIMA) and serotonin reuptake inhibitor (SRI)
- Buspirone transdermal (BuSpar Patch) – serotonin 5-HT_{1A} receptor partial agonist and other actions
- CGS-12066 – serotonin 5-HT_{1B} receptor partial agonist and other actions
- Coluracetam (BCI-540; MKC-231) – ionotropic glutamate AMPA receptor positive allosteric modulator, choline uptake and acetylcholine synthesis enhancer, and racetam
- DAA-1097 – translocator protein (TSPO) agonist
- Devazepide (Devacade; L-364718; MK-329) – Cholecystokinin A (CCK_{A}) receptor antagonist
- Dipraglurant (ADX-48621; mGluR5-NAM) – metabotropic glutamate mGlu_{5} receptor negative allosteric modulator
- Eglumetad (eglumegad; LY-354740) – metabotropic glutamate mGlu_{2} and mGlu_{3} receptor agonist
- Emapunil (AC-5216; XBD173) – translocator protein (TSPO) agonist
- Emicerfont (GW-876008; GW876008) – corticotropin releasing factor CRF_{1} receptor antagonist
- Enciprazine (D-3112; WY-48624) – serotonin 5-HT_{1A} receptor agonist and α_{1}-adrenergic receptor ligand
- Eplivanserin (Ciltyri; Sliwens; SR-46349; SR-46349B; SR-46615A) – serotonin 5-HT_{2A} receptor antagonist
- Eptapirone (F-11440) – serotonin 5-HT_{1A} receptor agonist
- Esprolol ((S)-ACC-9369) – beta blocker (β-adrenergic receptor antagonist) (amoxolol prodrug)
- Flesinoxan (DU-29373) – serotonin 5-HT_{1A} receptor agonist
- Gabapentin (CI-945; Gabapen; GOE-3450; Neurontin) – gabapentinoid (α_{2}δ subunit-containing voltage-gated calcium channel ligand)
- Girisopam (EGIS-5810; GYKI-51189) – GABA_{A} receptor positive allosteric modulator and benzodiazepine
- GT-2203 – histamine H_{3} receptor agonist
- Guanfacine (Guanfacine Carrier Wave project; SPD-554) – α_{2}-adrenergic receptor agonist
- Ipsapirone (BAY-Q-7821; TVX-Q-7821) – serotonin 5-HT_{1A} receptor partial agonist
- Isamoltane (CGP-361A) – beta blocker (β-adrenergic receptor antagonist) and serotonin 5-HT_{1A} and 5-HT_{1B} receptor antagonist
- Itasetron (DAU-6215; U-98079) – serotonin 5-HT_{3} receptor antagonist
- ITI-333 – serotonin 5-HT_{2A} receptor antagonist, dopamine D_{1} receptor antagonist, α_{1A}-adrenergic receptor antagonist, and μ-opioid receptor (MOR) partial agonist
- JNJ-19567470 (CRA-5626; R-317573) – corticotropin releasing factor CRF_{1} receptor antagonist
- Levetiracetam (Keppra; L-059; SIB-S1; UCB-059; UCB-22059; UCB-L059) – synaptic vesicle glycoprotein 2A (SV2A) ligand
- Lorazepam intranasal – GABA_{A} receptor positive allosteric modulator and benzodiazepine
- Mavoglurant (AFQ-056; STP-7) – metabotropic glutamate mGlu_{5} receptor antagonist
- Midazolam intranasal (ITI-111; midazolam nasal spray; Nayzilam; USL-261) – GABA_{A} receptor positive allosteric modulator and benzodiazepine
- MK-0777 (L-830982; TPA-023) – GABA_{A} receptor positive allosteric modulator and nonbenzodiazepine/triazolopyridazine
- NBI-34041 (SB-723620) – corticotropin-releasing hormone (CRH) inhibitor
- Nerisopam (EGIS-6775; GYKI-52322) – GABA_{A} receptor positive allosteric modulator and benzodiazepine
- Nivasorexant (ACT-539313; SORA) – orexin OX_{1} receptor antagonist
- NS-11821 (NS11821) – GABA_{A} receptor positive allosteric modulator and nonbenzodiazepine
- Orvepitant (GW-823296; GW823296X) – neurokinin NK_{1} receptor antagonist
- Osanetant (ACER-801; SR-142801; SR-142806) – neurokinin NK_{3} receptor antagonist
- Panadiplon (FD-10571; FG-10571; NNC-140571; U-78875) – GABA_{A} receptor positive allosteric modulator and nonbenzodiazepine/pyrazolopyrimidine
- Pazinaclone (A-77000; DN-2327) – GABA_{A} receptor positive allosteric modulator and nonbenzodiazepine/cyclopyrrolone
- Pozanicline (A-87089.0; ABT-089) – nicotinic acetylcholine receptor agonist
- Psilocybin (CYB-001; INT0052/2020) – non-selective serotonin receptor agonist and psychedelic hallucinogen
- Research programme: depression and anxiety therapies - Roche/Vernalis – undefined mechanism of action
- Research programme: GPCR modulators - Nxera Pharma – various actions
- Research programme: monoamine oxidase A inhibitors - CeNeRx BioPharma – monoamine oxidase A (MAO-A) inhibitors
- Ritanserin (R-55667) – serotonin 5-HT_{2} receptor antagonist and other actions
- Robalzotan (AZD-7371; NAD-299) – serotonin 5-HT_{1A} receptor antagonist
- RS-127445 (MT-500) – serotonin 5-HT_{2B} receptor antagonist
- SAX-187 (WAY-181187) – serotonin 5-HT_{6} receptor agonist
- Sergolexole (LY-281067) – serotonin 5-HT_{2} receptor antagonist
- Siramesine (LU-28179) – sigma σ_{2} receptor agonist
- SKL-PSY (FZ-016) – serotonin 5-HT_{1A} receptor agonist
- SSR-241586 (SSR241586) – neurokinin NK_{2} and NK_{3} receptor antagonist
- SUN-8399 – serotonin 5-HT_{1A} receptor agonist
- Suriclone (RP-31264) – GABA_{A} receptor positive allosteric modulator and nonbenzodiazepine/cyclopyrrolone
- Talaglumetad (LY-544344) – metabotropic glutamate mGlu_{2} and mGlu_{3} receptor agonist (eglumetad prodrug)
- Tiagabine (A-70569; CEP-6671; Gabitril; NO-050328; NO-328) – GABA transporter 1 (GAT-1) blocker and GABA reuptake inhibitor
- Troriluzole (BHV-4157; Dazluma; FC-4157; trigriluzole) – various actions (riluzole prodrug)
- Vestipitant (GW-597599) – neurokinin NK_{1} receptor antagonist
- Zabaglurant (TMP-301; TMP301; Heptares 25; HTL-0014242; HTL14242) – metabotropic glutamate mGlu_{5} receptor negative allosteric modulator
- Zalospirone (WY-47846) – serotonin 5-HT_{1A} receptor agonist

== Clinically used drugs ==
=== Approved drugs ===
- Emoxypine (ethylmethylhydroxypyridine; Mexidol) – antioxidant and unknown mechanism of action
- Tandospirone (metanopirone; Sediel; SM-3997) – serotonin 5-HT_{1A} receptor partial agonist
- Tianeptine (Coaxil; Stablon; Tatinol) – weak atypical μ-opioid receptor agonist and other actions

== See also ==
- Lists of investigational drugs
- List of investigational generalized anxiety disorder drugs
- List of investigational social anxiety disorder drugs
- List of investigational panic disorder drugs
- List of investigational post-traumatic stress disorder drugs
