= List of investigational autism and pervasive developmental disorder drugs =

Investigational pervasive developmental disorder drugs

This is a list of investigational autism and pervasive developmental disorder drugs, or drugs that are currently under development for clinical use in the treatment of autistic spectrum disorders (ASDs) and/or other pervasive developmental disorders (PDDs) but are not yet approved.

Chemical/generic names are listed first, with developmental code names, synonyms, and brand names in parentheses.

This list was last comprehensively updated in October 2024. It is likely to become outdated with time.

== Under development ==
=== Preregistration ===
- CM-4612 (CM-ADHD; CM-AT; CM-PK) – enzyme modulator/replacement for gastrointestinal or pancreatic secretory deficiencies

=== Phase 3 ===
- Brexpiprazole (Rexulti) – dopamine D_{2} and D_{3} receptor partial agonist, serotonin 5-HT_{1A} receptor partial agonist, serotonin 5-HT_{2A} 5-HT_{2B}, and 5-HT_{7} receptor antagonist, α_{1}- and α_{2}-adrenergic receptor antagonist, and atypical antipsychotic
- Cariprazine (Reagila, Symvenu, Vraylar; MP-214, RGH-188, WID-RGC20) – dopamine D_{2} and D_{3} receptor partial agonist, serotonin 5-HT_{1A} receptor partial agonist, serotonin 5-HT_{2B} receptor antagonist, and atypical antipsychotic
- Lumateperone (Caplyta) – dopamine D_{1} and D_{2} receptor antagonist, serotonin 5-HT_{2A} receptor antagonist, α_{1}-adrenergic receptor antagonist, serotonin reuptake inhibitor, and atypical antipsychotic
- Lurasidone (Latuda) – dopamine D_{2} and D_{3} receptor antagonist, serotonin 5-HT_{1A} receptor partial agonist, serotonin 5-HT_{2A} and 5-HT_{7} receptor antagonist, α_{2C}-adrenergic receptor antagonist, and atypical antipsychotic
- Tasimelteon (Hetlioz) – melatonin MT_{1} and MT_{2} receptor agonist

=== Phase 2 ===
- AB-2004 – microbiome modulator
- Acamprosate (AOP-2020; Campral; SF-679/SF-775; SF-999) – unknown / GABA_{A} receptor positive allosteric modulator and ionotropic glutamate NMDA receptor antagonist
- Alogabat (RG-7816, RG7816, RO-7017773; GABA-A-α_{5} PAM) – GABA_{A} α_{5} subunit-containing receptor positive allosteric modulator
- Arbaclofen ((R)-baclofen; STX-209) – GABA_{B} receptor agonist
- Cannabidiol (CBD; Epidiolex) – cannabinoid receptor modulator, other actions
- Cannabidiol transdermal patch/gel (Zygel; ZYN-002) – cannabinoid receptor modulator, other actions
- Cannabidivarin (CBDV; GWP-42006) – non-intoxicating cannabinoid receptor modulator, other actions
- CP-101 – bacteria relacement and gastrointestinal microbiome modulator
- JNJ-42165279 (JNJ-5279) – fatty acid amide hydrolase (FAAH) inhibitor
- Non-racemic MDMA (ALA-002; 70–80% (R)-MDMA, 20–30% (S)-MDMA) – serotonin, norepinephrine, and dopamine releasing agent, weak serotonin 5-HT_{2A}, 5-HT_{2B}, 5-HT_{2C} receptor agonist, entactogen, and weak psychedelic hallucinogen
- Oxytocin (intranasal potentiated oxytocin; TI-001, TI-114, TNX-1900, TNX-2900) – oxytocin receptor agonist
- Pitolisant (Wakix; tiprolisant) – histamine H_{3} receptor inverse agonist
- Racemetirosine (DL-α-methyltyrosine; L1-79) – tyrosine hydroxylase inhibitor
- Suramin (IV suramin; PAX-101/PAX-102) – DNA synthesis inhibitor and anti-purinergic agent
- Zolmitriptan modified-release (ML-004, ML004) – serotonin 5-HT_{1B} and 5-HT_{1D} receptor agonist

=== Phase 1 ===
- (R)-MDMA ((R)-midomafetamine; MM-402) – serotonin, norepinephrine, and dopamine releasing agent and weak serotonin 5-HT_{2A}, 5-HT_{2B}, and 5-HT_{2C} receptor agonist (entactogen and weak psychedelic hallucinogen)
- STP-1 (STALICLA Therapeutic Package 1) – phosphoric diester hydrolase inhibitor and sodium–potassium–chloride symporter inhibitor
- Sulforafan alfadex (sulforaphane alfadex; sulforafan α-cyclodextrin; SFX-01, STP-2; broccoli sprout extract) – various actions

=== Preclinical ===
- ASD-002 - a child-specific (non-acidic, sustained-release) anti-hyper excitatory ester prodrug of the potassium channel modulator NSAID mefenamic acid (MFA, approved as Ponstel) to prevent toddlers from becoming non-verbal (developmental language disorder, DLD)
- Bryostatin-1 (MW-904) – protein kinase C stimulant
- CJRB-303 (CJRB-901, MRx-0006) – bacteria replacement
- Debamestrocel (growth factor-producing stem cell therapy) – dopaminergic cell replacement therapy
- FIN-211 – bacteria replacement and gastrointestinal microbiome modulator
- Levophacetoperane (NLS-3; (R,R)-phacetoperone; methylphenidate reverse ester) – norepinephrine and dopamine reuptake inhibitor and psychostimulant
- LIT-001 – small-molecule oxytocin receptor agonist
- MBDB – serotonin and norepinephrine releasing agent and weak serotonin 5-HT_{1} and 5-HT_{2} receptor ligand (entactogen)
- Psilocin (PLZ-1015) – non-selective serotonin receptor agonist and psychedelic hallucinogen
- QBM-001 – undefined mechanism of action (allosteric channel modulator; putative neuroprotective and anti-inflammatory agent)

=== Research ===
- Baeocystin (PLZ-1019) – non-hallucinogenic serotonin 5-HT_{2A} receptor agonist, other actions
- Norpsilocin (PLZ-1017) – non-hallucinogenic serotonin 5-HT_{2A} receptor agonist, other actions
- Roluperidone (CYR-101, MIN-101, MT-210) – serotonin 5-HT_{2A}, sigma σ_{2}, and α_{1A}-adrenergic receptor antagonist
- Squalamine (ENT-01; Enterin-01; kenterin) – various actions

=== Phase unknown ===
- Psilocybin (COMP360; COMP-360) – non-selective serotonin receptor agonist and psychedelic hallucinogen

== Not under development ==
=== Development suspended ===
- KM-391 – serotonin reuptake inhibitor

=== No development reported ===
- AB-1224 – microbiome modulator
- AGX-201 (histamine dihydrochloride salt) – histamine H_{1} receptor antagonist and histamine H_{3} receptor agonist
- Aminolevulinic acid/sodium ferrous citrate (5-ALA-SFC, 5-ALA/SFX; sodium ferrous citrate/aminolevulinic acid; SPP-003) – erythropoiesis stimulant and photosensitizer
- Aripiprazole transdermal (AQS-1301; transdermal aripiprazole) – dopamine D_{2} and D_{3} receptor partial agonist, serotonin 5-HT_{1A} and 5-HT_{7} receptor partial agonist, serotonin 5-HT_{2A} and 5-HT_{2B} receptor antagonist or inverse agonist, and atypical antipsychotic
- BAER-101 (AZ-7325; AZD-7325) – selective GABA_{A} α_{2} and α_{3} subunit-containing receptor positive allosteric modulator
- BBP-472 – phosphatidylinositol 3 kinase β (PI3Kβ) inhibitor
- Fasoracetam co-crystallised (co-crystallised fasoracetam; AEVI-004) – various actions and racetam
- Guanfacine once-daily (Guanfacine Carrier Wave; SPD-547) – α_{2}-adrenergic receptor agonist
- KBLP-010 – bacteria replacement and microbiome modulator
- Oxytocin intranasal (OPN-300; OptiNose oxytocin) – oxytocin receptor agonist
- Research programme: allosteric modulators - Addex Therapeutics (various) – various actions
- Research programme: antisense oligonucleotide therapeutics - RogCon U.R (RCUR-313, RCUR-SMP) – voltage-gated sodium channel Na_{v}1.2 expression stimulants
- Research programme: autism and obesity therapeutics - Berand Neuropharmacology – histone deacetylase inhibitors
- Research programme: brain development disorder therapeutics - Seaside Therapeutics (STX-110) – metabotropic glutamate mGlu_{5} receptor antagonists and muscarinic acetylcholine M_{1} receptor antagonists
- Research programme: cannabinoid receptor modulators - GW Pharmaceuticals (cannabigerol; CBG) – cannabinoid receptor modulators
- Research programme: cannabis extract therapeutics - Cannabis Science (CBIS compounds) – cannabinoid receptor modulators
- Research programme: central nervous system therapeutics - AbbVie/Rugen – undefined mechanism of action
- Research programme: CNS disorder therapeutics - Promentis Pharmaceuticals – antioxidants, glutamate receptor modulators, SLC7A11 modulators
- Research programme: CNS disorders therapeutics - Sage Therapeutics (SAGE-105; SGE-202; SGE-301; SGE-516) – GABA_{A} receptor modulators and ionotropic glutamate NMDA receptor modulators
- Research programme: G protein-coupled receptor modulating small molecules - Omeros Corporation – G protein-coupled receptor modulator and neuromedin U receptor modulator
- Research programme: GPCR modulators - Nxera Pharma – various actions
- Research programme: immunomodulating bacteria-based therapeutics - 4D Pharma – bacteria replacements
- Research programme: metabotropic glutamate receptor 5 antagonists - Roche/Seaside Therapeutics – metabotropic glutamate mGlu_{5} receptor antagonists
- Research programme: oxytocin intranasal - Pastorus Pharma – neurotransmitter modulators/oxytocin receptor agonists
- Research programme: therapeutic autoantibodies - Sengenics – undefined mechanism of action
- RG-7713 (RG7713) – vasopressin V_{1A} receptor antagonist
- Tideglusib (AMO-02, NP-031112, NP-12; Nypta, Zentylor) – glycogen synthase kinase 3β (GSK-3β) inhibitor
- Vafidemstat (ORY-2001) – dual lysine specific demethylase 1 (LSD1) inhibitor and monoamine oxidase B (MAO-B) inhibitor
- Xenon (NBTX-001) – ionotropic glutamate NMDA receptor antagonist

=== Discontinued ===
- Balovaptan (RG-7314, RO-5028442, RO-5285119) – vasopressin V_{1A} receptor antagonist
- Blarcamesine (AE-37, ANA001, ANAVEX 2-73) – sigma σ_{1}, muscarinic acetylcholine M_{1}, and ionotropic glutamate NMDA receptor agonist
- Brilaroxazine (RP-5063, RP-5000) – dopamine D_{2}, D_{3}, D_{4} receptor partial agonist, serotonin 5-HT_{1A} receptor agonist, serotonin 5-HT_{2A}, 5-HT_{2B}, 5-HT_{7} receptor antagonist, and atypical antipsychotic
- Bumetanide oral liquid (S-95008) – sodium–potassium–chloride symporter/cotransporter inhibitor and indirect GABAergic inhibitor discontinued after failed phase 3 trial
- Carbetocin (CYP-2001) – oxytocin receptor agonist
- CX-516 (1-BCP; BDP-12, SPD-420; AMPAlex) – AMPA receptor modulator
- EM-036 (memantine analogue) – ionotropic glutamate NMDA receptor antagonist, other actions
- Fasoracetam (AEVI-001, LAM-105, MDGN-001, NFC-1, NS-105) – various actions and racetam
- Fluoxetine rapid-dissolve (AT-001; AT001; NPL-2008; Serelsa; Zydis™ ODT fluoxetine) – serotonin reuptake inhibitor
- GTS-21 (DMXB-A, DMXB-A sustained release, DMXB-A-SR) – α_{7} nicotinic acetylcholine receptor partial agonist
- Ketamine intranasal (RVT-701) – ionotropic glutamate NMDA receptor antagonist
- Memantine (Namenda) – ionotropic glutamate NMDA receptor antagonist, other actions
- Oxytocin intranasal (Syntocinon Nasal Spray; TUR 001) – oxytocin receptor agonist
- Research programme: AMPA receptor agonists (ampakines, AMPAkines; CX compounds) - RespireRx – ionotropic glutamate AMPA receptor agonists
- Research programme: NMDA receptor modulators - AbbVie/Naurex (NRX-1050; NRX-1051; NRX-1059; NRX-105x; NRX-1060; NRX-2085; NRX-20xx) – ionotropic glutamate NMDA receptor modulators
- Risperidone extended-release (Risperisphere) – dopamine D_{2} and D_{3} receptor antagonist, serotonin 5-HT_{1B}, 5-HT_{2A}, 5-HT_{2C}, and 5-HT_{7} receptor antagonist or inverse agonist, α_{1}- and α_{2}-adrenergic receptor antagonist, histamine H_{1} receptor inverse agonist, and atypical antipsychotic
- Secretin (INN-329, RG-1068; SecreFlo) – medical imaging enhancer (diagnosis)
- Suramin (Antrypol) – DNA-directed DNA polymerase inhibitor and intercellular signaling peptide/protein inhibitor
- Trichuris suis ova (CNDO-201, TSO, TSO-2500, TSO-7500) – immunomodulator
- Trofinetide (Daybue; G-2Me-PE; Glycyl-2-methyl-L-prolyl-L-glutamic acid; NNZ-2566; IGF-1 (1–3) analogue) – unknown / various actions

=== Formal development never or not yet started ===
- KNX-100 (KNX100; SOC-1) – oxytocin-like drug / indirect oxytocin receptor modulator

== Clinically used drugs ==
=== Approved drugs ===
- Aripiprazole (Abilify) – dopamine D_{2} and D_{3} partial agonist, serotonin 5-HT_{1A} and 5-HT_{7} receptor partial agonist, serotonin 5-HT_{2A} and 5-HT_{2B} receptor antagonist or inverse agonist, and atypical antipsychotic
- Risperidone (Risperdal) – dopamine D_{2} and D_{3} receptor antagonist, serotonin 5-HT_{1B}, 5-HT_{2A}, 5-HT_{2C}, and 5-HT_{7} receptor antagonist or inverse agonist, α_{1}- and α_{2}-adrenergic receptor antagonist, histamine H_{1} receptor inverse agonist, and atypical antipsychotic

=== Off-label drugs ===
- α_{2}-Adrenergic receptor agonists (e.g., clonidine, guanfacine)
- Anticonvulsants/mood stabilizers (e.g., valproic acid, lamotrigine)
- Antipsychotics (non-licensed) (e.g., haloperidol, olanzapine)
- Cannabinoids (e.g., cannabis, dronabinol, nabilone)
- Dietary supplements (e.g., N-acetylcysteine, omega-3 fatty acids, sulforaphane)
- Entactogens (serotonin releasing agents) (e.g., MDMA)
- Melatonin receptor agonists (e.g., melatonin)
- NMDA receptor antagonists (e.g., memantine, amantadine)
- Norepinephrine reuptake inhibitors (NRIs) (e.g., atomoxetine)
- Opioid receptor antagonists (e.g., naltrexone)
- Other antidepressants (e.g., mirtazapine)
- Oxytocin receptor agonists (e.g., oxytocin)
- Probiotics and prebiotics
- Psychostimulants (norepinephrine–dopamine releasing agents and/or reuptake inhibitors) (e.g., amphetamine, methylphenidate)
- Selective serotonin reuptake inhibitors (SSRIs) (e.g., fluoxetine, fluvoxamine, sertraline, citalopram)
- Serotonergic psychedelics (e.g., psilocybin, lysergic acid diethylamide (LSD))
- Serotonin–norepinephrine reuptake inhibitors (SNRIs) (e.g., milnacipran)
- Serotonin releasing agents (e.g., fenfluramine—withdrawn and no longer recommended)
- Serotonin 5-HT_{1A} receptor agonists (e.g., buspirone)
- Tricyclic antidepressants (TCAs) (e.g., clomipramine)

== See also ==
- List of investigational drugs
- List of investigational aggression drugs
- List of investigational agitation drugs
- List of investigational social anxiety disorder drugs
