= List of investigational generalized anxiety disorder drugs =

Investigational generalized anxiety disorder drugs

This is a list of investigational generalized anxiety disorder drugs, or drugs that are currently under development for clinical use in the treatment of generalized anxiety disorder (GAD) but are not yet approved.

Chemical/generic names are listed first, with developmental code names, synonyms, and brand names in parentheses. The format of list items is "Name (Synonyms) – Mechanism of Action [Reference]".

This list was last comprehensively updated in September 2025. It is likely to become outdated with time.

== Under development ==
=== Phase 3 ===
- Gepirone (Ariza; BMY-13805; Exxua; Gepirone ER; MJ-13805; Org-33062; TGFK-07AD; TGFK07AD; Travivo; Variza) – serotonin 5-HT_{1A} receptor partial agonist
- Lysergic acid diethylamide (LSD; lysergide; MM-120; MM120) – non-selective serotonin receptor agonist and psychedelic hallucinogen
- Toludesvenlafaxine extended release (4-methylbenzoate desvenlafaxine; ansofaxine; desvenlafaxine prodrug; LPM-570065; LY-03005; Ruoxinlin) – serotonin–norepinephrine–dopamine reuptake inhibitor (SNDRI)
- Vilazodone (EMD-68843; SB-659746A; Viibryd) – serotonin reuptake inhibitor (SRI) and serotonin 5-HT_{1A} receptor partial agonist

=== Phase 2/3 ===
- Ulotaront (SEP-363856; SEP-856) – trace amine-associated receptor 1 (TAAR1) agonist and serotonin 5-HT_{1A} receptor partial agonist

=== Phase 2 ===
- Desmethylcariprazine prodrug (ABBV-932; RGH-932) – dopamine D_{2} and D_{3} receptor partial agonist and other actions
- ENX-102 (ENX102) — α_{2}, α_{3}, and α_{5} subunit-containing GABA_{A} receptor positive allosteric modulator and nonbenzodiazepine
- FKW-00GA (FKW00GA; TGW-00AA; TGW00AA) – serotonin 5-HT_{1A} receptor partial agonist and serotonin 5-HT_{2A} receptor antagonist
- Lumateperone deuterated (ITI-1284) – atypical antipsychotic (non-selective monoamine receptor modulator
- ONO-1110 – endocannabinoid synthesis regulator and indirect cannabinoid receptor modulator
- TGFK-08AA (TGFK08AA) – serotonin 5-HT_{1A} receptor modulator
- Vortioxetine (Brintellix; Lu-AA21004; Trintellix; Vortidif) – serotonin reuptake inhibitor, serotonin 5-HT_{1A} and 5-HT_{1B} receptor agonist, and serotonin 5-HT_{1D}, 5-HT_{3}, and 5-HT_{7} receptor antagonist

=== Phase 1/2 ===
- Non-racemic MDMA (AM-1002; 90% (R)-MDMA, 10% (S)-MDMA) – serotonin, norepinephrine, and dopamine releasing agent, weak serotonin 5-HT_{2A}, 5-HT_{2B}, 5-HT_{2C} receptor agonist, entactogen, and weak psychedelic hallucinogen
- PT-00114 (PT100114; TCAP-1) – corticotropin-releasing hormone inhibitor

=== Phase 1 ===
- NTX-1955 (RO-7308480) – γ_{1} subunit-containing GABA_{A} receptor positive allosteric modulator
- SPT-320 (LYT-320) – agomelatine prodrug (melatonin receptor agonist and weak serotonin 5-HT_{2B} and 5-HT_{2C} receptor antagonist)

=== Preclinical ===
- Duloxetine oral liquid – serotonin–norepinephrine reuptake inhibitor (SNRI)
- Generalised anxiety disorder therapeutic - SIMR Biotech – undefined mechanism of action
- OV-4041 – potassium–chloride cotransporter agonist
- XYL-3001 (PSYLO-3001) – serotonin 5-HT_{2A} receptor agonist and non-hallucinogenic psychoplastogen

=== Phase unknown ===
- Oxybutynin controlled release – non-selective muscarinic acetylcholine receptor antagonist

== Not under development ==
=== Preregistration submission withdrawal ===
- Quetiapine (FK-949; FK949; ICI-204636; Seroquel; Seroquel XL; Seroquel XR) – atypical antipsychotic (non-selective monoamine receptor modulator)

=== Suspended ===
- Agomelatine (AGO-178; AGO178; Alodil; Melitor; S-20098; Thymanax; Valdoxan; Vestin) – melatonin MT_{1} and MT_{2} receptor agonist and weak serotonin 5-HT_{2C} receptor antagonist

=== No development reported ===
- Guanfacine extended release (Connexyn; Intuniv; Intuniv XR; S-877503; SHP-503; SPD-503) – α_{2}-adrenergic receptor agonist
- Riluzole sublingual (BHV-0223; Nurtec) – various actions
- Sertraline (Aremis; Besitran; CP-51974; Gladem; Lustral; Serad; Serlain; Tatig; Zoloft) – selective serotonin reuptake inhibitor (SSRI)

=== Discontinued ===
- Amibegron (SR-58611; SR-58611A) – β_{3}-adrenergic receptor agonist
- BTG-1640 (ABIO-08/01; ABIO-0801) – undefined mechanism of action
- Darigabat (CVL-865; PF-06372865; PF-6372865) – GABA_{A} receptor positive allosteric modulator
- Imagabalin (PD-0332334; PD-332334; PF-00195889) – α_{2}δ subunit-containing voltage-gated calcium channel ligand
- Naluzotan (PRX-00023) – serotonin 5-HT_{1A} receptor agonist and sigma σ_{1} receptor agonist
- Ocinaplon (CL-273547) – GABA_{A} receptor positive allosteric modulator and nonbenzodiazepine/pyrazolopyrimidine
- Pagoclone (IP-456; Panex; RP-62955) – GABA_{A} receptor positive allosteric modulator and nonbenzodiazepine/cyclopyrrolone
- PF-572778 – undefined mechanism of action
- Rufinamide (Banzel; CGP-33101; E-2080; Inovelon; RUF-331; SYN-111) – sodium channel blocker and other actions
- Talaglumetad (LY-544344) – metabotropic glutamate mGlu_{2} and mGlu_{3} receptor agonist (eglumetad prodrug)
- Tedatioxetine (Lu-AA24530) – serotonin–norepinephrine–dopamine reuptake inhibitor (SNDRI), serotonin 5-HT_{2A}, 5-HT_{2C}, and 5-HT_{3} receptor antagonist, and α_{1A}-adrenergic receptor antagonist

== Clinically used drugs ==
=== Approved drugs ===
==== Selective serotonin reuptake inhibitors (SSRIs) ====
- Escitalopram (Cipralex; Entact; Lexapro; LU-26054; MLD-55; (S)-citalopram; Seroplex; Sipralex; Sipralexa) – selective serotonin reuptake inhibitor (SSRI)
- Paroxetine (Aropax; BRL-29060; Deroxat; Divarius; FG-7051; Frosinor; Motivan; NNC-207051; Paxil; Seroxat; SI-211103; Tagonis) – selective serotonin reuptake inhibitor (SSRI)
- Paroxetine (Dropax; Dropaxin; Serestill) – selective serotonin reuptake inhibitor (SSRI)

==== Serotonin–norepinephrine reuptake inhibitors (SNRIs) ====
- Duloxetine (Ariclaim; Cymbalta; LY-227942; LY-248686; Xeristar; Yentreve) – serotonin–norepinephrine reuptake inhibitor (SNRI)
- Venlafaxine (Dobupal; Efexor XR; Effexor; Effexor XR; Elafax; WY-45030; WY-45651; WY-45655) – serotonin–norepinephrine reuptake inhibitor (SNRI)

==== Azapirones (serotonin 5-HT_{1A} receptor agonists) ====
- Buspirone (Buspar) – serotonin 5-HT_{1A} receptor partial agonist and other actions
- Tandospirone (metanopirone; Sediel; SM-3997) – serotonin 5-HT_{1A} receptor partial agonist

==== GABA_{A} receptor positive allosteric modulators ====
- Alpidem (Ananxyl; SL800342; SL-800342) – GABA_{A} receptor positive allosteric modulator and nonbenzodiazepine/imidazopyridine – discontinued/withdrawn due to toxicity
- Alprazolam (Xanax) – GABA_{A} receptor positive allosteric modulator and benzodiazepine

==== Other drugs ====
- Opipramol (Ensidon; G-33040; Insidon; Nisidana) – tricyclic antidepressant (TCA) (non-selective monoamine receptor modulator and other actions)
- Pregabalin (CI-1008; isobutylgaba; Lyrica; PD-144723) – gabapentinoid (α_{2}δ subunit-containing voltage-gated calcium channel ligand)

=== Off-label drugs ===
- α_{2}-Adrenergic receptor agonists (e.g., guanfacine)
- Atypical antipsychotics (non-selective monoamine receptor modulators) (e.g., aripiprazole, olanzapine, quetiapine, risperidone, ziprasidone)
- Benzodiazepines (GABA_{A} receptor positive allosteric modulators) (e.g., chlordiazepoxide, clonazepam, diazepam, lorazepam)
- Beta blockers (β-adrenergic receptor antagonists) (e.g., propranolol)
- Gabapentinoids (α_{2}δ subunit-containing voltage-gated calcium channel ligands) (e.g., gabapentin, gabapentin enacarbil)
- GABA reuptake inhibitors (e.g., tiagabine)
- Monoamine oxidase inhibitors (MAOIs) (e.g., phenelzine, tranylcypromine)
- NMDA receptor antagonists (e.g., esketamine, ketamine)
- Nonbenzodiazepines/Z-drugs (GABA_{A} receptor positive allosteric modulators) (e.g., eszopiclone)
- Selective serotonin reuptake inhibitors (SSRIs) (e.g., citalopram, fluoxetine, fluvoxamine, sertraline)
- Serotonin antagonists and reuptake inhibitors (SARIs) (e.g., trazodone, nefazodone)
- Serotonin modulators and stimulators (SMSs) (e.g., vilazodone, vortioxetine)
- Tetracyclic antidepressants (TeCAs) (e.g., mirtazapine)
- Tricyclic antidepressants (TCAs) (e.g., amitriptyline, clomipramine, doxepin, imipramine)
- Others (e.g., agomelatine, bupropion, hydroxyzine)

== See also ==
- Lists of investigational drugs
- List of investigational anxiety disorder drugs
- List of investigational social anxiety disorder drugs
- List of investigational panic disorder drugs
- List of investigational post-traumatic stress disorder drugs
