= List of investigational post-traumatic stress disorder drugs =

Investigational PTSD drugs

This is a list of investigational post-traumatic stress disorder drugs, or drugs that are currently under development for clinical use for the treatment of post-traumatic stress disorder (PTSD) but are not yet approved.

Chemical/generic names are listed first, with developmental code names, synonyms, and brand names in parentheses. The format of list items is "Name (Synonyms) – Mechanism of Action [Reference]".

This list was last comprehensively updated in September 2025. It is likely to become outdated with time.

== Under development ==
=== Preregistration ===
- Midomafetamine (MDMA; "ecstasy") – serotonin–norepinephrine–dopamine releasing agent, weak serotonin 5-HT_{2} receptor agonist, and entactogen

=== Phase 3 ===
- Aripiprazole (Abilify; OPC-14597) – atypical antipsychotic (non-selective monoamine receptor modulator)
- Cyclobenzaprine (KRL-102; TNX-102; Tonmya) – tricyclic antidepressant (monoamine reuptake inhibitor and monoamine receptor modulator)

=== Phase 2 ===
- 7-Oxoprasterone (7-keto-DHEA; HBL-9001; HL-9001; At-Ease) – undefined mechanism of action (immunomodulator)
- Amdiglurax (ALTO-100; NSI-189) – unknown mechanism of action (hippocampal neurogenesis stimulant and indirect brain-derived neurotrophic factor (BDNF) modulator)
- BI-1358894 – transient receptor potential cation channel TRPC4 and TRPC5 inhibitor
- Cannabidiol (A-1002-N5S; CBD; Nantheia™) – cannabinoid, various actions
- CORT-108297 (ADS-108297) – glucocorticoid receptor antagonist
- Dronabinol (BX-1) – cannabinoid CB_{1} and CB_{2} receptor agonist
- Iloperidone (Fanapt; Fanaptum; Fiapta; HP-873; ILO-522; VYV-683; Zomaril) – atypical antipsychotic (non-selective monoamine receptor modulator)
- Ketamine intranasal (Ereska; PMI-100; PMI-150; SLS-002; TUR-002) – NMDA receptor antagonist and dissociative hallucinogen
- Lithium cocrystal (AL-001; LiProSal; lithium salicylate/L-proline cocrystal) – undefined mechanism of action and mood stabilizer (improved formulation of lithium)
- Methylone (MDMC; TSND-201) – serotonin–norepinephrine–dopamine releasing agent and entactogen
- Midomafetamine/citalopram (MDMA/citalopram) – serotonin–norepinephrine–dopamine releasing agent, weak serotonin 5-HT_{2} receptor agonist, and entactogen followed by a selective serotonin reuptake inhibitor
- Psilocybin (COMP-360; COMP360) – non-selective serotonin receptor agonist, serotonin 5-HT_{2A} receptor agonist, and psychedelic hallucinogen
- Psilocybin (MYCO-001, MYCO-003) – non-selective serotonin receptor agonist, serotonin 5-HT_{2A} receptor agonist, and psychedelic hallucinogen
- Soclenicant (BNC-210; IW-2143) – α_{7}-nicotinic acetylcholine receptor antagonist
- SRX-246 (API-246) – vasopressin V_{1A} receptor antagonist
- Xenon (NBTX-001) – NMDA receptor antagonist

=== Phase 1/2 ===
- PT-00114 – corticotropin-releasing hormone (CRH) inhibitor

=== Phase 1 ===
- Dexmedetomidine (BXCL-501; Igalmi; KalmPen) – α_{2}-adrenergic receptor agonist
- ENX-205 – dopamine D_{2} and D_{3} receptor antagonist and serotonin 5-HT_{1A} and 5-HT_{2A} receptor agonist
- (R)-Midomafetamine ((R)-MDMA; EMP-01) – serotonin–norepinephrine releasing agent, weak serotonin 5-HT_{2} receptor agonist, and entactogen
- Mirodenafil (AR-1001) – phosphodiesterase PDE5 inhibitor

=== Preclinical ===
- 2-Bromo-LSD (bromolysergide; BOL-148; BETR-001, TD-0148A) – non-hallucinogenic serotonin 5-HT_{2A} receptor agonist and other actions
- ART-2612 (ART2612) – FABP5 inhibitor
- BMB-202 – serotonin 5-HT_{2A} receptor agonist
- Cycloserine/lurasidone (NRX-101) – combination of cycloserine (NMDA receptor partial agonist) and lurasidone (atypical antipsychotic or non-selective monoamine receptor modulator)
- Cyproheptadine/prazosin (KT-110; Periactine/Alpress) – combination of cyproheptadine (H_{1} receptor antagonist, muscarinic acetylcholine receptor antagonist, serotonin receptor antagonist, other actions) and prazosin (α_{1}-adrenergic receptor antagonist)
- GM-3009 (ibogaine analogue(s); GMX-3009) – various actions
- Leu-enkephalin (leucine enkephalin; Envelta; METDoloron; NES-100; NM-0127; NM-127; PES200) – δ-opioid receptor agonist
- Metyrapone/oxazepam (EMB-001C; EMB-001) – combination of metyrapone (11β-hydroxylase inhibitor, antiglucocorticoid) and oxazepam (GABA_{A} receptor positive allosteric modulator, benzodiazepine)
- Midomafetamine microneedle transdermal patch (MDMA; "ecstasy") – serotonin–norepinephrine–dopamine releasing agent, weak serotonin 5-HT_{2} receptor agonist, and entactogen
- NB-127 – undefined mechanism of action
- NNI-351 – DYRK kinase inhibitor, nerve growth factor (NGF) stimulant
- Prabotulinumtoxin A (ABP-450; DWP-450; Evosyal; Jeuveau; Nabota; Nuceiva) – acetylcholine release inhibitor and neuromuscular blocking agent
- Research programme: neurotransmitter modulators - Awakn Life Sciences (AWKN-SDN-14) – serotonin–norepinephrine–dopamine reuptake inhibitors
- TN-001 – non-hallucinogenic serotonin 5-HT_{2A} receptor partial agonist and serotonin 5-HT_{2B} receptor antagonist and neuroplastogen

== Not under development ==
=== Development suspended ===
- Osanetant (ACER-801; SR-142801; SR-142806) – neurokinin NK_{3} receptor antagonist

=== No development reported ===
- Bupropion (amfebutamone; Wellbutrin) – norepinephrine–dopamine reuptake inhibitor and nicotinic acetylcholine receptor negative allosteric modulator
- Elcubragistat (ABX-1431; Lu-AG06466) – monoacylglycerol lipase (MAGL) inhibitor
- EX-597 (KDS-4103; ORG-231295; URB-597) – fatty acid amide hydrolase (FAAH) inhibitor
- IMM-201 (DAR-901; SRL-172; heat-killed Mycobacterium vaccae strain NCTC-11659) – immunomodulator, immunostimulant, and vaccine
- Ketamine sublingual (SLS-003; Wafermine) – NMDA receptor antagonist and dissociative hallucinogen
- Lanicemine (ARL-15896; ARR-15896; BHV-5500; FPL-15896) – NMDA receptor antagonist
- Research programme: allosteric modulators - Addex Therapeutics – various actions
- Research programme: cannabis extract therapeutics - Cannabis Science
- Research programme: cannabinoid-based therapeutics - Axim Biotechnologies (Cannabidiol/Gabapentin; Cannbleph™)
- Research programme: CNS disorders therapeutics - Sage Therapeutics (SAGE 105; SGE-202; SGE-301; SGE-516) – GABA_{A} receptor modulators and NMDA receptor modulators
- Research programme: psychedelic and empathogenic compounds subcutaneous - Bexson Biomedical – undefined mechanisms of action
- Research programme: serotonin 2A receptor agonists - Bright Minds Biosciences
- Research programme: tryptamine based therapeutics - PsyBio Therapeutics – serotonin 5-HT_{2A} receptor agonists
- Topiramate (Epitomax; KW-6485; KW-6485P; MCN 4853; RWJ 17021; Topamax; Topimax; Topina) – various actions

=== Discontinued ===
- Acamprosate controlled-release (SNC-102) – various actions
- ALTO-202 – NMDA receptor antagonist
- Balovaptan (RG-7314; RO-5028442; RO-5285119) – vasopressin V_{1} receptor antagonist
- Brexpiprazole (Lu-AF41156; OPC-34712; Rexulti) – atypical antipsychotic (non-selective monoamine receptor modulator)
- Carvedilol (Coreg) – α_{1}-, β_{1}-, and β_{2}-adrenergic receptor antagonist and dual alpha/beta blocker
- Crinecerfont (Crenessity; NBI-74788; SSR-125543) – corticotropin releasing factor receptor 1 (CRF_{1}R) antagonist
- ENX-105 – dopamine D_{2} and D_{3} receptor agonist, dopamine D_{4} receptor agonist, and serotonin 5-HT_{1A} and 5-HT_{2A} receptor agonist
- Fluoxetine (Prozac, Sarafem) – selective serotonin reuptake inhibitor
- Ganaxolone (GNX; CCD-1042; Ztalmy) – GABA_{A} receptor positive allosteric modulator and neurosteroid
- JZP-150 (PF-04457845; PF-4457845; PF-’845) – fatty acid amide hydrolase (FAAH) inhibitor
- Nabiximols (tetrahydrocannabinol/cannabidiol; THC/CBD; GW-1000; JZP-378; Nabidiolex®/Tetranabinex®; Sativex) – cannabinoid receptor modulator, other actions
- Naloxone/tianeptine (TNX-601) – combination of tianeptine (weak and atypical μ-opioid receptor agonist) and naloxone (orally inactive opioid receptor antagonist)
- Nepicastat (APL-1401; SYN-117) – dopamine β-hydroxylase (DBH) inhibitor
- NYX-783 – NMDA receptor modulator
- Orvepitant (GW-823296, GW823296X) – neurokinin NK_{1} receptor antagonist
- Pomaglumetad methionil (DB103; LY-2140023; LY-2812223; LY-404039 prodrug) – metabotropic glutamate mGlu_{2} and mGlu_{3} receptor agonist (pomaglumetad prodrug)
- PRAX-114 – GABA modulator
- PRX-3140 (PRX-03140; NTC-942) – serotonin 5-HT_{4} receptor agonist
- Verucerfont (GSK-561679; NBI-77860) – corticotropin releasing factor receptor 1 (CRF_{1}R) antagonist

== Clinically used drugs ==
=== Approved drugs ===
==== Selective serotonin reuptake inhibitors (SSRIs) ====
- Paroxetine (Dropax, Paxil, Seroxat, Serestill) – selective serotonin reuptake inhibitor (SSRI)
- Sertraline (Lustral, Zoloft) – selective serotonin reuptake inhibitor (SSRI)

=== Off-label drugs ===
- Antipsychotics (non-selective monoamine receptor modulators) (e.g., olanzapine, quetiapine, risperidone)
- Benzodiazepines (GABA_{A} receptor positive allosteric modulators) (e.g., alprazolam, clonazepam, diazepam, lorazepam)
- Beta blockers (β-adrenergic receptor antagonists) (e.g., propranolol, sotalol)
- Cannabinoids (cannabinoid receptor agonists) (e.g., cannabis, THC/dronabinol, nabilone)
- Lamotrigine (sodium channel blocker, other actions)
- Monoamine oxidase inhibitors (MAOIs) (e.g., phenelzine)
- NMDA receptor antagonists (dissociative hallucinogens) (e.g., ketamine, esketamine)
- Other selective serotonin reuptake inhibitors (SSRIs) (e.g., citalopram, escitalopram, fluoxetine, fluvoxamine)
- Prazosin (α_{1}-adrenergic receptor antagonist)
- Serotonin–norepinephrine reuptake inhibitors (SNRIs) (e.g., desvenlafaxine, duloxetine, milnacipran, venlafaxine)
- Topiramate (various actions)
- Tricyclic antidepressants (TCAs) (e.g., imipramine, amitriptyline)

== See also ==
- List of investigational drugs
- List of investigational generalized anxiety disorder drugs
- List of investigational panic disorder drugs
- List of investigational social anxiety disorder drugs
- List of investigational anxiety disorder drugs
- Ibogaine
