= List of investigational social anxiety disorder drugs =

This is a list of investigational social anxiety disorder drugs, or drugs that are currently under development for clinical use in the treatment of social anxiety disorder (SAD; or social phobia) but are not yet approved.

Chemical/generic names are listed first, with developmental code names, synonyms, and brand names in parentheses.

This list was last comprehensively updated in August 2024. It is likely to become outdated with time.

== Under development ==
=== Phase 3 ===
- Fasedienol (Aloradine; AM-005; PH-94B; 4-androstadienol) – vomeropherine
- Soclenicant (BNC-210; IW-2143) – α_{7} nicotinic acetylcholine receptor negative allosteric modulator (abandoned after failed phase 3 trials. See Neuphoria nixes social anxiety program after phase 3 flop.)
- VQW-765 (VQW765; AQW051; AQW-051; JQH481R778) – α_{7} nicotinic acetylcholine receptor partial agonist VQW 765 - AdisInsight

=== Phase 2/3 ===
- Riluzole sublingual (BHV-0223; Nurtec) – complex mechanism of action or glutamatergic modulator

=== Phase 2 ===
- Cannabidiol (CBD; ATL5; RLS103) – cannabinoid receptor modulator and other actions
- Cannabidiol (CBD; Empower CBD) – cannabinoid receptor modulator and other actions
- ENX-102 (ENX102) — α_{2}, α_{3}, and α_{5} subunit-containing GABA_{A} receptor positive allosteric modulator and nonbenzodiazepine
- FKW00GA (FKW-00GA; TGW-00AA; TGW00AA) – serotonin 5-HT_{1A} receptor partial agonist and serotonin 5-HT_{2A} receptor antagonist
- JNJ-42165279 (JNJ-5279) – fatty acid amide hydrolase (FAAH) inhibitor
- (R)-Midomafetamine ((R)-MDMA; R-MDMA; EMP-01) – serotonin, norepinephrine, and dopamine releasing agent, weak serotonin 5-HT_{2A}, 5-HT_{2B}, 5-HT_{2C} receptor agonist, entactogen, and weak psychedelic hallucinogen
- Non-racemic MDMA (ALA-002; 70–80% (R)-MDMA, 20–30% (S)-MDMA) – serotonin, norepinephrine, and dopamine releasing agent, weak serotonin 5-HT_{2A}, 5-HT_{2B}, 5-HT_{2C} receptor agonist, entactogen, and weak psychedelic hallucinogen
- NTX-1472 (RO-6953958) – vasopressin V_{1A} receptor antagonist
- ONO-1110 – endocannabinoid synthesis regulator and indirect cannabinoid receptor modulator ONO 1110 - AdisInsight Delving into the Latest Updates on ONO-1110 with Synapse Ozmosi | ONO-1110 Drug Profile
- Oxytocin (intranasal potentiated oxytocin; TI-001; TI-114; TNX-1900; TNX-2900) – oxytocin receptor agonist
- Vilazodone (Viibryd) – serotonin 5-HT_{1A} receptor partial agonist and serotonin reuptake inhibitor

=== Phase 1 ===
- SNTX-2643 (SENS-01) – atypical serotonin reuptake inhibitor (SRI) (kanna-derived)

=== Preclinical ===
- Dimethyltryptamine (DMT) – non-selective serotonin receptor agonist and psychedelic hallucinogen
- EX-14280 – fatty acid amide hydrolase (FAAH) inhibitor
- EX-14663 – fatty acid amide hydrolase (FAAH) inhibitor
- PSYLO-3001 (Psylo-3001) – non-selective serotonin receptor agonist and psychedelic hallucinogen
- Research programme: CNS disorders and substance-related disorders therapeutics - Kinoxis Therapeutics — oxytocin receptor modulators

=== Phase unknown ===
- Fluvoxamine extended-release – selective serotonin reuptake inhibitor (SSRI)
- Venlafaxine controlled-release – serotonin–norepinephrine reuptake inhibitor (SNRI)

== Not under development ==
=== No development reported ===
- Bupropion (Wellbutrin) – norepinephrine–dopamine reuptake inhibitor (NDRI) and nicotinic acetylcholine receptor negative allosteric modulator
- EX-597 (KDS-4103; ORG-231295; URB-597) – fatty acid amide hydrolase (FAAH) inhibitor
- Guanfacine extended-release (Connexyn; Intuniv; Intuniv XR; S-877503; SHP-503; SPD-503) – α_{2}-adrenergic receptor agonist

=== Development discontinued ===
- AV-608 (CGP-60829; NK-608; NKP-608C; NKP608) – neurokinin NK_{1} receptor antagonist
- Cycloserine (D-cycloserine; TIK-101; TIK101) — NMDA receptor partial agonist
- Tradipitant (LY-686017; VLY-686) – neurokinin NK_{1} receptor antagonist
- Verucerfont (GSK-561679; NBI-77860) – corticotropin-releasing hormone receptor 1 (CRF_{1}) antagonist

=== Formal development never or not yet started ===
- Small-molecule oxytocin receptor agonists (e.g., LIT-001, LIT-002)
- 15-Lipoxygenase (15-LOX; ALOX15) inhibitors (small-molecule indirect oxytocin-like drugs) (e.g., KNX-100 (SOC-1), KNX-101)

== Clinically used drugs ==
=== Approved drugs ===
==== Selective serotonin reuptake inhibitors (SSRIs) ====
- Escitalopram (Lexapro; Cipralex) – selective serotonin reuptake inhibitor
- Fluvoxamine (Depromel; Luvox) – selective serotonin reuptake inhibitor
- Paroxetine (Dropax; Serestill; Paxil; Seroxat) – selective serotonin reuptake inhibitor
- Sertraline (Zoloft; Lustral) – selective serotonin reuptake inhibitor

==== Serotonin–norepinephrine reuptake inhibitors (SNRIs) ====
- Venlafaxine (Dobupal; Effexor; Effexor XR; Elafax) – serotonin–norepinephrine reuptake inhibitor

==== Monoamine oxidase inhibitors (MAOIs) ====
- Moclobemide (Manerix) – reversible inhibitor of monoamine oxidase A (RIMA)

=== Off-label drugs ===
- Alcohol (over-the-counter self-medication) – GABA_{A} receptor positive allosteric modulator
- Atypical antipsychotics (e.g., olanzapine, quetiapine) – monoamine receptor modulators
- Benzodiazepines (e.g., alprazolam, chlordiazepoxide, clonazepam, diazepam, lorazepam, oxazepam) – GABA_{A} receptor positive allosteric modulators
- Beta blockers (e.g., atenolol, propranolol) – β-adrenergic receptor antagonists
- Bupropion (Wellbutrin) – norepinephrine–dopamine reuptake inhibitor (NDRI) and nicotinic acetylcholine receptor negative allosteric modulator
- Cannabidiol (CBD) – cannabinoid receptor modulator and other actions, found in cannabis
- Gabapentinoids (e.g., gabapentin, pregabalin) – α_{2}δ subunit-containing voltage-dependent calcium channel blockers
- Monoamine oxidase inhibitors (MAOIs) (e.g., phenelzine, selegiline, tranylcypromine)
- NMDA receptor antagonists (e.g., ketamine)
- Other anticonvulsants (besides gabapentinoids) (e.g., topiramate, valproic acid, tiagabine)
- Psychostimulants (e.g., amphetamine, methylphenidate)
- Selective serotonin reuptake inhibitors (SSRIs) (non-licensed) (e.g., citalopram, fluoxetine)
- Serotonin–norepinephrine reuptake inhibitors (SNRIs) (non-licensed) (e.g., desvenlafaxine, duloxetine)
- Serotonin 5-HT_{1A} receptor agonists (e.g., buspirone)
- Tricyclic antidepressants (TCAs) (e.g., clomipramine, imipramine)

== See also ==
- List of investigational drugs
- List of investigational generalized anxiety disorder drugs
- List of investigational panic disorder drugs
- List of investigational post-traumatic stress disorder drugs
- List of investigational anxiety disorder drugs
- List of investigational autism and pervasive developmental disorder drugs
- List of investigational aggression drugs
