= List of investigational obsessive–compulsive disorder drugs =

Investigational obsessive–compulsive disorder drugs

This is a list of investigational obsessive–compulsive disorder drugs, or drugs that are currently under development for clinical use in the treatment of obsessive–compulsive disorder (OCD) but are not yet approved.

Chemical/generic names are listed first, with developmental code names, synonyms, and brand names in parentheses. The format of list items is "Name (Synonyms) – Mechanism of Action [Reference]".

This list was last comprehensively updated in September 2025. It is likely to become outdated with time.

== Under development ==
=== Phase 2 ===
- BP-1.4979 (BP-1.4979; BP-14979; BP14979) – dopamine D_{3} receptor partial agonist
- Psilocybin (SYNP-101; synthetic psilocybin) – non-selective serotonin receptor agonist and psychedelic hallucinogen

=== Phase 1 ===
- Carbidopa/oxytriptan (EVX-101; carbidopa/oxitriptan; carbidopa/5-HTP) – combination of carbidopa (aromatic L-amino-acid decarboxylase (AAAD) inhibitor) and oxytriptan (5-HTP; serotonin precursor)
- Psilocybin (MLS-101) – non-selective serotonin receptor agonist and psychedelic hallucinogen

=== Preclinical ===
- HBL20017 – non-hallucinogenic non-selective serotonin receptor agonist

=== Research ===
- Research programme: obsessive-compulsive disorder therapeutics - Serenatis Bio – dopamine modulators and glutamate modulators

== Not under development ==
=== No development reported ===
- Agomelatine (AGO-178; AGO178C; Alodil; Melitor; S-20098; S-20098-F55; Thymanax; Valdoxan; Vestin) – melatonin MT_{1} and MT_{2} receptor agonist and weak serotonin 5-HT_{2C} receptor antagonist
- Ketamine (AWKN-001; AWKN-P-001) – ionotropic glutamate NMDA receptor antagonist
- Research programme: Cannabidiol therapeutics - Phytecs (4'-F-CBD; fluorinated cannabidiol; HUF-102; HUF-103) – cannabinoid receptor modulators
- Research programme: cannabis extract therapeutics - Cannabis Science (CBIS compounds) – cannabinoid receptor modulators
- Research programme: central nervous system therapeutics - AbbVie/Rugen – undefined mechanism of action
- Research programme: GPCR modulators - Nxera Pharma – various actions
- Research programme: orexin receptor antagonists - Rottapharm (CR-5542) – orexin receptor antagonists
- Research programme: serotonin reuptake inhibitors/serotonin 1A receptor antagonists - Pfizer (SSA-426; SSRI/5HT1A receptor antagonist; WAY-163426; WAY-211612; WAY-253752; WAY-426) – serotonin reuptake inhibitors and serotonin 5-HT_{1A} receptor antagonists
- Risperidone (JNJ-410397-AAA; R-64766; R064766; Risperdal; Risperdal Consta; Risperdal Depot) – atypical antipsychotic (non-selective monoamine receptor modulator

=== Discontinued ===
- Bitopertin (DISC-1459; R-1678; RG-6178; RG1678; RO-4917838) – glycine transporter 1 (GlyT1) inhibitor and glycine reuptake inhibitor
- Cycloserine (D-cycloserine; TIK-101) – ionotropic glutamate NMDA receptor partial agonist and other actions
- DSP-1181 – serotonin 5-HT_{1A} receptor agonist
- F-14258 – serotonin 5-HT_{1B} and 5-HT_{1D} receptor antagonist
- Mavoglurant (AFQ-056; STP-7) – metabotropic glutamate mGlu_{5} receptor antagonist
- Minocycline (NPL-2003) – various actions and "glutamate modulator"
- Naltrexone/fluoxetine (fluoxetine/naltrexone; OREX-004) – combination of naltrexone (opioid receptor antagonist) and fluoxetine (selective serotonin reuptake inhibitor (SSRI))
- Ondansetron (Setrodon; TO-2061) – serotonin 5-HT_{3} receptor antagonist
- Ro-600175 (Ro600175) – serotonin 5-HT_{2C} receptor agonist
- Roxindole (EMD-49980) – non-selective monoamine receptor modulator
- SB-200646 (SB-200646A) – serotonin 5-HT_{2B} and 5-HT_{2C} receptor antagonist
- Secretin (INN-329; RG-1068; SecreFlo; synthetic human secretin) – secretin receptor agonist and medical imaging enhancer
- Troriluzole (BHV-4157; Dazluma; FC-4157; trigriluzole) – various actions (riluzole prodrug)

=== Formal development never or not yet started ===
- Antiandrogens (e.g., flutamide, cyproterone acetate, triptorelin)
- Cannabinoids (e.g., nabilone, tetrahydrocannabinol (THC), cannabis)
- Nonsteroidal anti-inflammatory drugs (NSAIDs) (e.g., celecoxib, naproxen)
- Rituximab (Rituxan) – monoclonal antibody against CD20
- Serotonin 5-HT_{6} receptor agonists (e.g., WAY-181187, WAY-208466)
- Tolcapone (Tasmar) – catechol-O-methyltransferase (COMT) inhibitor

== Clinically used drugs ==
=== Approved drugs ===
==== Selective serotonin reuptake inhibitors (SSRIs) ====
- Escitalopram (Cipralex; Entact; Lexapro; LU-26054; MLD-55; (S)-citalopram; Seroplex; Sipralex; Sipralexa) – selective serotonin reuptake inhibitor (SSRI)
- Fluoxetine (LY-110140; Prozac; Prozac Weekly; Reneuron; Sarafem) – selective serotonin reuptake inhibitor (SSRI)
- Fluoxetine – selective serotonin reuptake inhibitor (SSRI)
- Fluvoxamine (Depromel; Luvox; Luvox CR; SME-3110) – selective serotonin reuptake inhibitor (SSRI) and sigma σ_{1} receptor agonist
- Paroxetine (Aropax; BRL-29060; Deroxat; Divarius; FG-7051; Frosinor; Motivan; NNC-207051; Paxil; Paxil CR; Seroxat; SI-211103; Tagonis) – selective serotonin reuptake inhibitor (SSRI)
- Paroxetine (Dropax; Dropaxin; Serestill) – selective serotonin reuptake inhibitor (SSRI)
- Sertraline (Aremis; Besitran; CP-51974; CP-51974-01; Gladem; J Zoloft; Lustral; Serad; Serlain; Tatig; Zoloft) – selective serotonin reuptake inhibitor (SSRI)

==== Tricyclic antidepressants (TCAs) ====
- Clomipramine (Anafranil) – tricyclic antidepressant (TCA) (non-selective monoamine reuptake inhibitor and receptor modulator)

=== Off-label drugs ===
- Anticonvulsants (e.g., lamotrigine, topiramate)
- Antipsychotics (non-selective monoamine receptor modulators) (e.g., aripiprazole, haloperidol, olanzapine, quetiapine, risperidone)
- Anxiolytics (e.g., benzodiazepines, buspirone)
- Entactogens (e.g., midomafetamine/MDMA)
- Monoamine oxidase inhibitors (MAOIs) (e.g., phenelzine, tranylcypromine, moclobemide)
- NMDA receptor antagonists (e.g., memantine, ketamine)
- Serotonergic psychedelics (e.g., psilocybin, lysergic acid diethylamide (LSD), dimethyltryptamine (DMT))
- Serotonin 5-HT_{3} receptor antagonist (e.g., ondansetron, granisetron, tropisetron)
- Serotonin–norepinephrine reuptake inhibitors (SNRIs) (e.g., desvenlafaxine, duloxetine, venlafaxine)
- Stimulants (e.g., dextroamphetamine)

== See also ==
- List of investigational drugs
