= Roxindole =

Dopaminergic & serotonergic drug developed for schizophrenia treatment

Clinical data
- Other names: EMD-49980; EMD49980
- Drug class: Dopamine D_{2}-like receptor agonist; Serotonin 5-HT_{1A} receptor agonist; Serotonin reuptake inhibitor
- ATC code: None

Identifiers
- IUPAC name: 3-[4-(4-phenyl-3,6-dihydro-2H-pyridin-1-yl)butyl]-1H-indol-5-ol
- CAS Number: 112192-04-8
- PubChem CID: 219050
- IUPHAR/BPS: 52
- DrugBank: DB19883
- ChemSpider: 189880
- UNII: 43227SMS0O
- ChEBI: CHEBI:48558
- ChEMBL: ChEMBL431367
- CompTox Dashboard (EPA): DTXSID5043895

Chemical and physical data
- Formula: C_{23}H_{26}N_{2}O
- Molar mass: 346.474 g·mol^{−1}
- 3D model (JSmol): Interactive image
- SMILES: C1CN(CC=C1C2=CC=CC=C2)CCCCC3=CNC4=C3C=C(C=C4)O
- InChI: InChI=1S/C23H26N2O/c26-21-9-10-23-22(16-21)20(17-24-23)8-4-5-13-25-14-11-19(12-15-25)18-6-2-1-3-7-18/h1-3,6-7,9-11,16-17,24,26H,4-5,8,12-15H2; Key:HGEYJZMMUGWEOT-UHFFFAOYSA-N

Roxindole (INN; developmental code name EMD-49980) is a dopaminergic and serotonergic drug which was under development for the treatment of major depressive disorder, obsessive–compulsive disorder (OCD), panic disorder, and psychotic disorders like schizophrenia but was never marketed.

== Pharmacology ==
=== Pharmacodynamics ===
Roxindole acts as an agonist at the following receptors:

- D_{2} receptor (K_{i} = 2.82 nM)
- D_{3} receptor (K_{i} = 1.17 nM)
- D_{4} receptor (K_{i} = 5.89 nM)
- 5-HT_{1A} receptor (K_{i} = 0.380 nM)

At D_{2} and possibly D_{3} receptors roxindole is a partial agonist with preferential actions at autoreceptors and has been touted as a 'selective' autoreceptor agonist, hence the justification of its application as an antipsychotic. It shows markedly lower affinity for the serotonin 5-HT_{1B} and 5-HT_{1D} receptors and acts as a weak partial agonist of these receptors. It is also a serotonin reuptake inhibitor (IC_{50} = 1.4 nM) and has been reported to act as a 5-HT_{2A} receptor antagonist as well.

== History and development ==
Roxindole was originally developed by Merck KGaA for the treatment of schizophrenia. In clinical trials its antipsychotic efficacy was only modest but it was unexpectedly found to produce potent and rapid antidepressant and anxiolytic effects. As a result, roxindole was further researched for the treatment of depression instead. It has also been investigated as a therapy for Parkinson's disease and prolactinoma. However, it has never been marketed. The drug reached phase 3 clinical trials prior to the discontinuation of its development.

== See also ==
- List of investigational antidepressants
- List of investigational antipsychotics
- List of investigational obsessive–compulsive disorder drugs
- List of investigational panic disorder drugs
- Carmoxirole
- Dimethylhomotryptamine
