= FKW00GA =

Experimental serotonergic drug

Clinical data
- Other names: FKW-00GA; TGW00AA; TGW-00AA; TGWOOAA; TGW-OOAA
- Routes of administration: Oral
- Drug class: Serotonin 5-HT_{1A} receptor partial agonist; Serotonin 5-HT_{2A} receptor antagonist

FKW00GA, also known as TGW00AA, is a serotonin 5-HT_{1A} receptor partial agonist and serotonin 5-HT_{2A} receptor antagonist which is under development for the treatment of generalized anxiety disorder, social phobia (social anxiety disorder), and sexual dysfunction. It is taken by mouth.

As of June 2021, FKW00GA is in phase 2 clinical trials for generalized anxiety disorder, social phobia, and sexual dysfunction. It has been in phase 2 clinical trials since at least 2018. The drug is under development by Fabre-Kramer Pharmaceuticals. FKW00GA is a small molecule, but its chemical structure does not yet seem to have been released.

== See also ==
- List of investigational generalized anxiety disorder drugs
- List of investigational social anxiety disorder drugs
- List of investigational sexual dysfunction drugs
