= FR260010 =

Clinical data
- Other names: FR-260010
- Routes of administration: Oral
- Drug class: Serotonin 5-HT_{2C} receptor antagonist
- ATC code: None

Identifiers
- IUPAC name: N-[3-(4-methylimidazol-1-yl)phenyl]-5,6-dihydrobenzo[h]quinazolin-4-amine
- CAS Number: 374555-75-6
- PubChem CID: 9968450
- ChemSpider: 8144042
- UNII: 6SDJ3JV4WB

Chemical and physical data
- Formula: C_{22}H_{19}N_{5}
- Molar mass: 353.429 g·mol^{−1}
- 3D model (JSmol): Interactive image
- SMILES: CC1=CN(C=N1)C2=CC=CC(=C2)NC3=NC=NC4=C3CCC5=CC=CC=C54
- InChI: InChI=1S/C22H19N5/c1-15-12-27(14-25-15)18-7-4-6-17(11-18)26-22-20-10-9-16-5-2-3-8-19(16)21(20)23-13-24-22/h2-8,11-14H,9-10H2,1H3,(H,23,24,26); Key:LFKNMCJSJZOQJF-UHFFFAOYSA-N

FR260010 is a selective serotonin 5-HT_{2C} receptor antagonist which was under development for the treatment of anxiety disorders but was never marketed. It is taken orally.

The drug shows high affinity for the serotonin 5-HT_{2C} receptor (K_{i} = 1.1 nM) and high selectivity over the serotonin 5-HT_{2A} receptor (K_{i} = 386 nM) and many other targets. Similarly, it shows little affinity for the serotonin 5-HT_{2B} receptor. FR260010 is a silent antagonist of the serotonin 5-HT_{2C} receptor. It blocks the hypolocomotion and hypophagia induced by the serotonin 5-HT_{2C} receptor agonist meta-chlorophenylpiperazine (mCPP) in rodents. Similarly to diazepam, the drug produces anxiolytic-like effects in multiple different animal models of anxiety, whereas buspirone was ineffective in the same models. In contrast to diazepam but similarly to buspirone, FR260010 has modest adverse effect-like properties in rodents.

FR260010 was under development by Astellas Pharma. It was first described in the scientific literature by 2006. No recent development has been reported as of 2016. It reached the discovery stage of development prior to its discontinuation.

== See also ==
- List of investigational anxiety disorder drugs
