= ENX-102 =

Clinical data
- Other names: ENX102; TPA-023B; TPA-023-B; TPA023B; TPA-023b; TPA023b
- Routes of administration: Oral
- Drug class: GABA_{A} receptor positive allosteric modulator; Nonbenzodiazepine; Anxiolytic

Pharmacokinetic data
- Onset of action: 3–4.5 hours (T_{max})
- Elimination half-life: 25–66 hours

Identifiers
- IUPAC name: 3-fluoro-2-[2-fluoro-5-[3-(2-hydroxypropan-2-yl)imidazo[1,2-b][1,2,4]triazin-7-yl]phenyl]benzonitrile
- CAS Number: 425377-76-0
- PubChem CID: 9865233
- ChemSpider: 8040925
- UNII: GMY695BP6Q
- ChEMBL: ChEMBL204696
- CompTox Dashboard (EPA): DTXSID9047330

Chemical and physical data
- Formula: C_{21}H_{15}F_{2}N_{5}O
- Molar mass: 391.382 g·mol^{−1}
- 3D model (JSmol): Interactive image
- SMILES: CC(C)(C1=NC2=NC=C(N2N=C1)C3=CC(=C(C=C3)F)C4=C(C=CC=C4F)C#N)O
- InChI: InChI=1S/C21H15F2N5O/c1-21(2,29)18-11-26-28-17(10-25-20(28)27-18)12-6-7-15(22)14(8-12)19-13(9-24)4-3-5-16(19)23/h3-8,10-11,29H,1-2H3; Key:PCZLQMGFNUNVOM-UHFFFAOYSA-N

ENX-102, also known as TPA-023B, is a GABA_{A} receptor positive allosteric modulator, nonbenzodiazepine, and investigational anxiolytic which is under development for the treatment of generalized anxiety disorder and social phobia (social anxiety disorder). It is taken orally.

The drug is a selective and partial positive allosteric modulator of α_{2}, α_{3}, and α_{5} subunit-containing GABA_{A} receptors, whereas it shows no activity at α_{1} subunit-containing GABA_{A} receptors, and is potentially "anxioselective", producing anxiolytic effects with little or no sedation, in contrast to existing agents like benzodiazepines and Z-drugs.

== Side effects ==
Side effects of ENX-102 include mild and transient fatigue, tiredness, somnolence, and drowsiness. It has also been found to produce cognitive and memory impairment. The adverse effects of ENX-102 appear to be less than with lorazepam. Tolerance develops to the effects and side effects of ENX-102.

== Pharmacology ==
=== Pharmacodynamics ===
ENX-102 acts as a subunit-selective positive allosteric modulator of the benzodiazepine site of the GABA_{A} receptor. More specifically, it selectively and partially potentiates GABA_{A} receptors containing α_{2}, α_{3}, and α_{5} subunits, whilst showing no activity at as a silent allosteric modulator or functionally antagonizing GABA_{A} receptors containing α_{1} subunits.

ENX-102 activities
| GABA_{A}R | ENX-102 | | Diazepam | |
| GABA_{A}R | E_{max} | EC_{50} (nM) | E_{max} | EC_{50} (nM) |
|---|---|---|---|---|
| α_{1}β_{3}γ_{2}L | 3% | ND | 140% | 22.2 |
| α_{2}β_{3}γ_{2}L | 89% | 0.82 | 385% | 6.19 |
| α_{3}β_{3}γ_{2}L | 113% | 2.47 | 429% | 42.6 |
| α_{5}β_{3}γ_{2}L | 96% | 0.20 | 208% | 15.4 |

The drug produces anxiolytic-like effects in animals, including in rodents and primates. It produced robust anxiolytic-like effects comparable to those of chlordiazepoxide in rodents. The drug was "anxioselective" in rodents and primates, producing no sedation at doses 10- to 30-fold higher and corresponding to receptor occupancies of greater than 98%. The electroencephalogram (EEG) changes for ENX-102 were distinct from those of benzodiazepines in animals. ENX-102 also showed distinct discriminative stimulus or interoceptive effects from those of lorazepam and zolpidem in rodent drug discrimination tests. It generalizes with TPA-023, but not with lorazepam or zolpidem.

TPA-023 showed no misuse potential in baboons, whereas ENX-102 was not assessed but may be expected to be similar. Subsequent research has found that ENX-102 is self-administered by monkeys but shows reduced reinforcing effects compared to benzodiazepines. In addition, ENX-102 has been found to attenuate benzodiazepine self-administration. The drug also attenuated benzodiazepine withdrawal symptoms. It has been suggested for the potential treatment of benzodiazepine addiction.

ENX-102 has been evaluated in humans. It reduced saccadic peak velocity (SPV), a biomarker reflecting arousal and a potential surrogate marker for anxiolysis. The reduction in SPV was comparable to that with lorazepam. Conversely, the drug showed minimal effects on alertness and motor coordination and did not produce sedation. In addition, like in animals, it showed distinct EEG changes compared to benzodiazepines. The GABA_{A} receptor occupancy of ENX-102 has been studied in humans. At approximately 50% receptor occupancy, there was no sedation with ENX-102, whereas benzodiazepines produce clear sedation at occupancies of only 15 to 24%.

Subsequent research, based on animal studies and including ENX-102 and other agents, has suggested that α_{1} subunit-containing GABA_{A} receptors may mediate moderate or deep sedation, whereas α_{2} and α_{3} subunit-containing GABA_{A} receptors may mediate a mild form of sedation.

In addition to its anxiolytic effects, ENX-102 also produces analgesic effects in animals. In 2026, it was unexpectedly found that ENX-102's analgesic effects did not correlate with receptor occupancy at γ_{2} subunit-containing GABA_{A} receptors and that the drug not only potentiated these receptors but also potentiated γ_{1} subunit-containing GABA_{A} receptors that could be involved in the analgesic effects.

=== Pharmacokinetics ===
ENX-102 is well-absorbed with oral administration in humans. The time to peak levels is 3 to 4.5 hours. Steady-state levels are reached after 6 days of continuous daily administration. The drug accumulation ratio is 3 to 4. ENX-102 levels decline biexponentially, with a terminal half-life of 25 to 66 hours. There was minimal interindividual variability in the pharmacokinetics of ENX-102. The pharmacokinetics of ENX-102, including oral bioavailability, have also been studied in animals.

== Chemistry ==
ENX-102 is specifically formulated as the phosphate salt. The chemical synthesis of ENX-102 has been described.

== History and development ==
ENX-102 was first described in the scientific literature by 2005. It was developed by Merck and was originally known as TPA-023B. The drug was formally clinically developed by this company and appears to have reached phase 1 clinical trials. ENX-102 is now under development by Engrail Therapeutics. As of October 2025, it is in phase 2 clinical trials for treatment of social phobia and other anxiety disorders. In terms of other anxiety disorders, it is specifically under development for generalized anxiety disorder. The first publication on ENX-102 in the scientific literature under this specific developmental code name was published in 2022.

== See also ==
- GABA_{A} receptor positive allosteric modulator
- Nonbenzodiazepine
- List of investigational generalized anxiety disorder drugs
- List of investigational social anxiety disorder drugs
- List of investigational anxiety disorder drugs
- TPA-023 (MK-0777)
- MRK-409 (MK-0343)
- L-838417
- NTX-1955 (RO-7308480)
