= Lithium salicylate =

Lithium compound

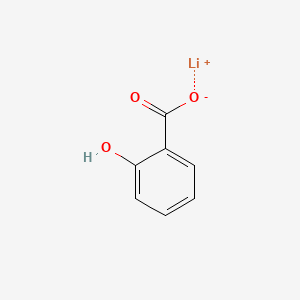

Names
- IUPAC name lithium 2-hydroxybenzoate

Identifiers
CAS Number	552-38-5
ChemSpider	10620
PubChem CID	23663621
UNII	93F1SP6QIN

Properties
Chemical formula	C_{7}H_{5}LiO_{3}
- Except where otherwise noted, data are given for materials in their standard state (at 25 °C [77 °F], 100 kPa). Infobox references

Lithium salicylate (C_{7}H_{5}LiO_{3}) is a crystalline salt of salicylic acid and lithium used in medicine and materials. Lithium cocrystal, a combination of lithium salicylate and the amino acid L-proline, is under development as a drug for Alzheimer's disease, bipolar disorder, and other uses.

== See also ==
- Lithium cocrystal
