= ONO-1110 =

Clinical data
- Other names: ONO1110
- Routes of administration: Oral
- Drug class: Endocannabinoid synthesis regulator; Indirect cannabinoid receptor modulator

ONO-1110 is an endocannabinoid synthesis regulator and indirect cannabinoid receptor modulator which is under development for the treatment of fibromyalgia, generalized anxiety disorder, interstitial cystitis, major depressive disorder, postherpetic neuralgia, and social phobia. It is taken orally. ONO-1110 is under development by Ono Pharmaceutical in Japan. As of March 2025, the drug is in phase 2 clinical trials for all indications. Its chemical structure does not yet appear to have been disclosed.

== See also ==
- List of investigational antidepressants
- List of investigational fibromyalgia drugs
- List of investigational generalized anxiety disorder drugs
- List of investigational social anxiety disorder drugs
