= TPA-023 =

Chemical compound

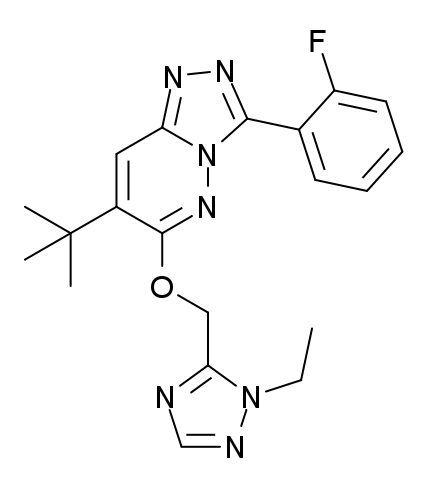

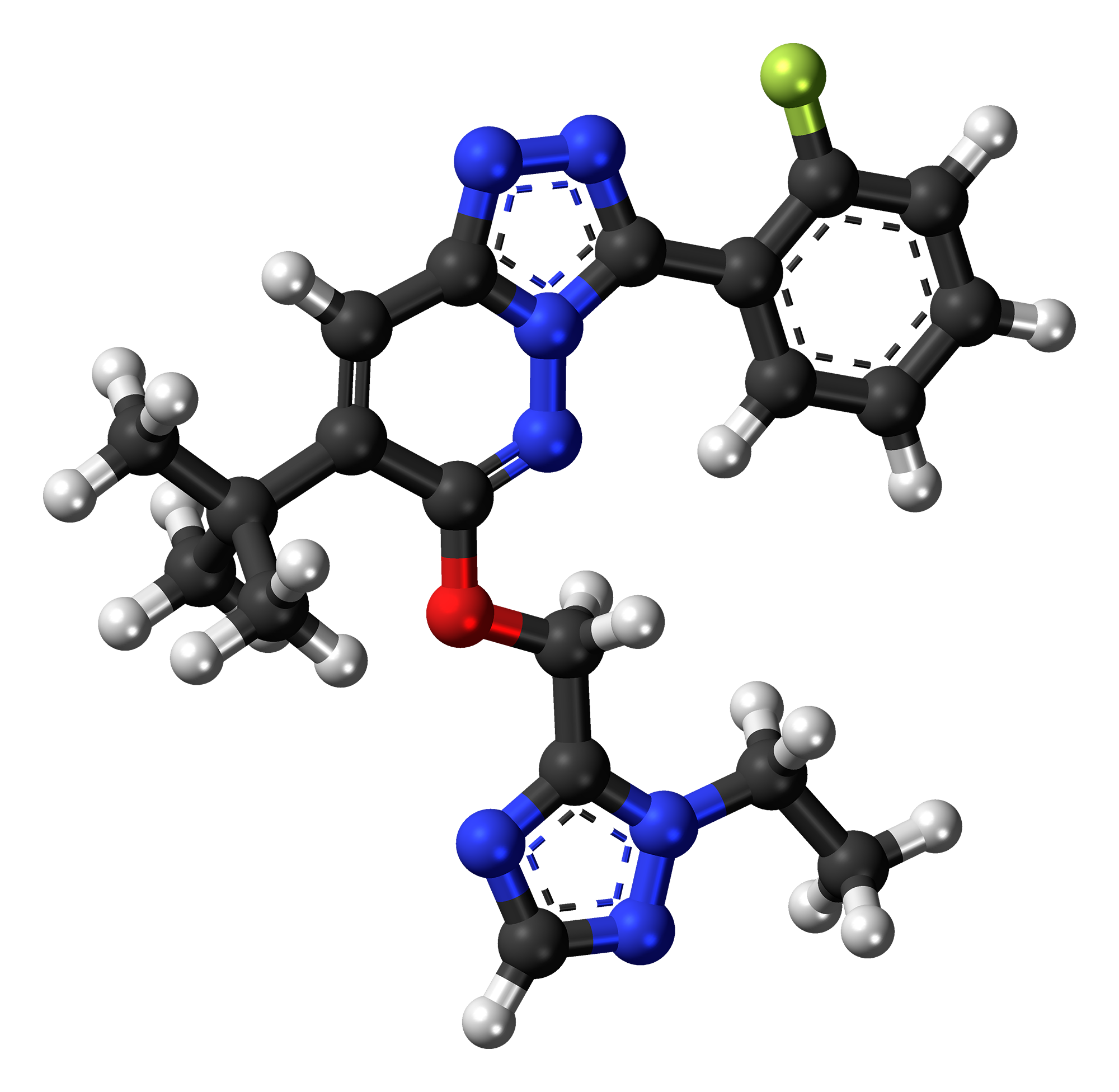

Clinical data
- Other names: MK-0777
- Routes of administration: By mouth

Pharmacokinetic data
- Metabolism: liver
- Elimination half-life: 6.7 hours

Identifiers
- IUPAC name: 7-(1,1-Dimethylethyl)-6-(2-ethyl-2H-1,2,4-triazol-3-ylmethoxy)-3-(2-fluorophenyl)-1,2,4-triazolo[4,3-b]pyridazine
- CAS Number: 252977-51-8
- PubChem CID: 9908684
- ChemSpider: 8084336
- UNII: 1FI3KTC550
- CompTox Dashboard (EPA): DTXSID10179938

Chemical and physical data
- Formula: C_{20}H_{22}FN_{7}O
- Molar mass: 395.442 g·mol^{−1}
- 3D model (JSmol): Interactive image
- SMILES: CC(C)(C)C2=Cc3nnc(-c1ccccc1F)n3N=C2OCc4ncnn4CC
- InChI: InChI=1S/C20H22FN7O/c1-5-27-17(22-12-23-27)11-29-19-14(20(2,3)4)10-16-24-25-18(28(16)26-19)13-8-6-7-9-15(13)21/h6-10,12H,5,11H2,1-4H3; Key:QKIWQBLNTSQOLY-UHFFFAOYSA-N

TPA-023 (MK-0777) is an anxiolytic drug with a novel chemical structure, which is used in scientific research. It has similar effects to benzodiazepine drugs, but is structurally distinct and so is classed as a nonbenzodiazepine anxiolytic. It is a mixed, subtype-selective ligand of the benzodiazepine site of α1, α2, α3, and α5-containing GABA_{A} receptors, where it acts as a partial agonist at benzodiazepine sites of the α2 and α3-containing subtypes, but as a silent antagonist at α1 and α5-containing subtypes. It has primarily anxiolytic and anticonvulsant effects in animal tests, but with no sedative effects even at 50 times the effective anxiolytic dose.

In human trials on healthy volunteers, TPA-023 was comparable to lorazepam, but lacked negative effects on cognition, memory, alertness or coordination seen with the latter drug. In Phase II trials, the compound was significantly superior to placebo without inducing sedation. The clinical development was halted due to preclinical toxicity (cataract) in long term dosing studies. TPA-023 is well absorbed following oral administration and extensively metabolised by the liver, with a half-life of 6.7 hours. The main enzyme involved in its metabolism is CYP3A4, with some contribution by CYP3A5.

== See also ==
- List of investigational antipsychotics
- List of investigational anxiety disorder drugs
- ENX-102 (TPA-023B)
