= CGS-12066 =

Chemical compound

Clinical data
- Other names: CGS12066; CGS-12066A; CGS12066A; CGS-12066B; CGS12066B
- Routes of administration: Unknown
- Drug class: Serotonin 5-HT_{1B} receptor agonist
- ATC code: None

Identifiers
- IUPAC name: 4-(4-methylpiperazin-1-yl)-7-(trifluoromethyl)pyrrolo[1,2-a]quinoxaline
- CAS Number: 109028-09-3
- PubChem CID: 2689
- IUPHAR/BPS: 109
- ChemSpider: 2588
- UNII: 5TB4SXQ7HG
- ChEBI: CHEBI:64055
- ChEMBL: ChEMBL27403
- CompTox Dashboard (EPA): DTXSID3043730

Chemical and physical data
- Formula: C_{17}H_{17}F_{3}N_{4}
- Molar mass: 334.346 g·mol^{−1}
- 3D model (JSmol): Interactive image
- SMILES: CN1CCN(CC1)C2=NC3=C(C=CC(=C3)C(F)(F)F)N4C2=CC=C4
- InChI: InChI=1S/C17H17F3N4/c1-22-7-9-23(10-8-22)16-15-3-2-6-24(15)14-5-4-12(17(18,19)20)11-13(14)21-16/h2-6,11H,7-10H2,1H3; Key:LXFHSCDLMBZYKY-UHFFFAOYSA-N

CGS-12066, also known as CGS-12066A and CGS-12066B, is a predominant serotonin 5-HT_{1B} receptor agonist which was under development for the treatment of anxiety disorders but was never marketed. Its route of administration is unknown.

In terms of affinity, it is moderately (17-fold) selective for the serotonin 5-HT_{1B} receptor over the serotonin 5-HT_{1A} receptor, where it is also an agonist. Although reported to be a selective serotonin 5-HT_{1B} receptor agonist, it was subsequently found to be equipotent as an agonist of the serotonin 5-HT_{1B} and 5-HT_{1D} receptors. The drug showed weak affinity for the serotonin 5-HT_{2A}, 5-HT_{2B}, and 5-HT_{2C} receptors (K_{i} = 871–4,270 nM). It had minimal affinity for various adrenergic and dopamine receptors.

CGS-12066 produces anxiolytic-like, prosocial, and antiaggressive effects in rodents. There is rapid tolerance to its prosocial effects, thought to be due to desensitization of serotonin 5-HT_{1B} receptors. The drug also produces hyperlocomotion in rodents, although to a much lesser extent than RU-24969, perhaps due to its lower-efficacy partial agonism of the serotonin 5-HT_{1B} receptor. It produces wakefulness and reduces slow wave sleep (SWS) and rapid eye movement (REM) sleep in rodents. Some of the effects of CGS-12066 in animals, such as hypothermia and serotonin behavioral syndrome, are not mediated by the serotonin 5-HT_{1B} receptor.

CGS-12066 was first described in the scientific literature by 1987. It reached the preclinical research stage of development for anxiety disorders prior to the discontinuation of its development in 1995.

== See also ==
- Serotonin 5-HT_{1B} receptor agonist
- List of investigational anxiety disorder drugs
