= Alogabat =

GABAA receptor modulator

Clinical data
- Other names: GABA-Aa5 PAM; GABA-Aα5 PAM; RG-7816; RG7816; RO-7017773; RO7017773
- Routes of administration: Oral
- Drug class: α_{5} subunit-containing GABA_{A} receptor positive allosteric modulator

Identifiers
- IUPAC name: 6-[[5-methyl-3-(6-methylpyridin-3-yl)-1,2-oxazol-4-yl]methoxy]-N-(oxan-4-yl)pyridazine-3-carboxamide
- CAS Number: 2230009-48-8
- PubChem CID: 134588268
- DrugBank: DB18708
- ChemSpider: 115006746
- UNII: 0HPA4GK3UH
- KEGG: D12382
- ChEMBL: ChEMBL5095259

Chemical and physical data
- Formula: C_{21}H_{23}N_{5}O_{4}
- Molar mass: 409.446 g·mol^{−1}
- 3D model (JSmol): Interactive image
- SMILES: CC1=NC=C(C=C1)C2=NOC(=C2COC3=NN=C(C=C3)C(=O)NC4CCOCC4)C
- InChI: InChI=1S/C21H23N5O4/c1-13-3-4-15(11-22-13)20-17(14(2)30-26-20)12-29-19-6-5-18(24-25-19)21(27)23-16-7-9-28-10-8-16/h3-6,11,16H,7-10,12H2,1-2H3,(H,23,27); Key:ACZCJTHHWMBFKC-UHFFFAOYSA-N

Alogabat (INN, USAN; developmental code names RG-7816 and RO7017773) is an α_{5} subunit-containing GABA_{A} receptor positive allosteric modulator which is under development for the treatment of pervasive developmental disorders (e.g., autism) and Angelman syndrome. It is taken by mouth.

As of June 2024, alogabat is in phase 2 clinical trials for pervasive developmental disorders and Angelman syndrome. It is under development by Roche.

== See also ==
- Darigabat
