= Lithium cocrystal =

Experimental psychiatric medication

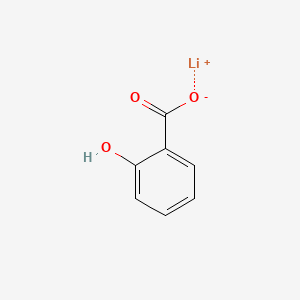

- Lithium salicylate (top) and L-proline (bottom)

Combination of
- Lithium salicylate: Lithium salt
- L-Proline: Amino acid

Clinical data
- Trade names: AL-001, Lithium salicylate/L-proline cocrystal, LiProSal, LISPRO
- Routes of administration: oral
- Drug class: Mood stabilizer

Lithium cocrystal (AL-001, Lithium salicylate/L-proline cocrystal, LiProSal, LISPRO) is a form of lithium that combines lithium salicylate and the amino acid L-proline. The ionic cocrystal (ICC) form combines the lithium salt with an organic anion. This formulation allows more of the compound to cross the blood–brain barrier and into the central nervous system. The lithium salicylate/L-proline cocrystal allows approximately 20% lower blood serum levels versus lithium carbonate, and thus fewer attendant side effects.

== Clinical trials ==
The compound is in phase 2 clinical trials for Alzheimer's disease, bipolar disorder, major depressive disorder and PTSD. Lithium cocrystal was created in 2004 at the University of South Florida. It is under development by Alzamend Neuro with the designation AL-001, with phase II trials for bipolar disorder and Alzheimer's disease beginning in April 2026.

== See also ==
- List of investigational antidepressants
- List of investigational bipolar disorder drugs
- List of investigational post-traumatic stress disorder drugs
- Lithium (medication)
