= NTX-1472 =

Clinical data
- Other names: NTX1472; RO-6953958; RO6953958
- Routes of administration: Oral
- Drug class: Vasopressin V_{1A} receptor antagonist

Pharmacokinetic data
- Elimination half-life: ~5–7 hours

NTX-1472, also known as RO-6953958, is a vasopressin V_{1A} receptor antagonist which is under development for the treatment of social phobia (social anxiety disorder). It is taken orally.

The drug is a potent and highly selective antagonist of the vasopressin V_{1A} receptor, with an affinity (K_{i}) of 0.5 nM and an inhibitory potency (K_{b}) of 0.22 nM. Vasopressin V_{1A} receptor antagonists have been found to reduce amygdala activation in response to threatening social cues and to reduce anxiety-potentiated startle in humans, which are thought to be possible biomarkers of treatment response for social phobia.

NTX-1472 was originated by Roche and is under development by Newleos Therapeutics. As of January 2026, it is in phase 2 clinical trials for social phobia. The chemical structure of NTX-1472 does not yet appear to have been disclosed.

== See also ==
- Vasopressin receptor antagonist
- List of investigational social anxiety disorder drugs
