= Isamoltane =

Drug used in scientific research

Clinical data
- Other names: Isamoltan; CGP-361A; CGP361A
- Drug class: Beta blocker; Serotonin 5-HT_{1A} receptor antagonist; Serotonin 5-HT_{1B} receptor antagonist
- ATC code: None

Identifiers
- IUPAC name: 1-(propan-2-ylamino)-3-(2-pyrrol-1-ylphenoxy)propan-2-ol
- CAS Number: 99740-06-4
- PubChem CID: 127403
- ChemSpider: 113051
- UNII: 214SP5P1EX
- CompTox Dashboard (EPA): DTXSID00912513

Chemical and physical data
- Formula: C_{16}H_{22}N_{2}O_{2}
- Molar mass: 274.364 g·mol^{−1}
- 3D model (JSmol): Interactive image
- SMILES: OC(CNC(C)C)COc1ccccc1n2cccc2

Isamoltane (developmental code name CGP-361A) is a beta blocker (β-adrenergic receptor antagonist) with additional serotonin 5-HT_{1A} and 5-HT_{1B} receptor antagonist activity. It has about 5-fold higher affinity for the serotonin 5-HT_{1B} receptor (K_{i} = 21 nM) over the serotonin 5-HT_{1A} receptor (K_{i} = 112 nM). It has anxiolytic effects in rodents. The drug was under development by Novartis and AstraZeneca for the treatment of anxiety disorders in the 1990s but was never marketed.

== See also ==
- List of investigational anxiety disorder drugs
