= Teneurin C-terminal associated peptide =

Family of peptides

Teneurin C-terminal associated peptides (TCAPs) are a family of highly conserved 40–41 amino acid peptides encoded within the C-terminus of the type II transmembrane proteins known as teneurins that are involved with cell adhesion. TCAPs are proposed to be liberated by proteolytic cleavage from the parent protein. Once released, TCAPs have been shown in have been shown in HEK293 cell assays and rodent models to act as to act as soluble neuromodulatory and metabolic regulators that influence neuronal morphology, synaptic connectivity, and stress responsiveness, in part via cytoskeletal remodeling, enhanced energy generating oxidative metabolism in some contexts, and based on in vitro studies, functional interaction with adhesion GPCRs of the latrophilin family.

== Species distribution ==
Across vertebrates, four paralogous TCAPs (TCAP-1–4) exhibit structural similarity to corticotropin-releasing hormone (CRH) and other secretin-family peptides and have been shown in rodent and non-mammalian models to exert anxiolytic-like effects, modulate glucose and energy homeostasis, and participate in broader tissue-specific signaling, highlighting TCAPs as evolutionarily conserved peptides.

== Therapeutic applications ==
TCAPs are potential starting points for neuropsychiatric and metabolic disease therapeutics.

== Biosynthesis and sequences ==
TCAP peptides are encoded at the distal C‑terminus of teneurins, where they are bounded by an N‑terminal prohormone convertase–like Lys/Arg cleavage site and a C‑terminal glycine‑basic amidation motif (e.g. GKR/GRR) immediately before the stop codon, consistent with proteolytic release and subsequent C‑terminal amidation by peptidylglycine alpha-amidating monooxygenase.

Human teneurin C-terminal associated peptides (TCAPs)
TCAP	Source protein	UniProt accession	Residue range	Length (aa)	Upstream cleavage site	TCAP Sequence	Downstream amidation site
TCAP-1	Teneurin-1	Q9UKZ4	2690–2730	41	EKQ	QLLSTGRVQGYDGYFVLSVEQYLELSDSANNIHFMRQSEIG-NH2	RR
TCAP-2	Teneurin-2	Q9NT68	2723–2763	41	EKQ	QLLSTGRVQGYEGYYVLPVEQYPELADSSSNIQFLRQNEMG-NH2	KR
TCAP-3	Teneurin-3	Q9P273	2657–2697	41	EKR	QLLSAGKVQGYDGYYVLSVEQYPELADSANNIQFLRQSEIG-NH2	RR
TCAP-4	Teneurin-4	Q6N022	2752–2792	41	EKQ	QVLSTGRVQGYDGFFVISVEQYPELSDSANNIHFMRQSEMG-NH2	RR
Sequence conservation (Note: An asterisk (*) indicates a fully conserved residue, a colon (:) indicates conservation between residues with strongly similar physicochemical properties, a period (.) indicates weakly similar properties, and a blank indicates no significant conservation at that position.)					**:	*:**:*:****:*::*: **** **:**:.**:*:**.*:*	:*

== See also ==
- PT-00114
