= NS-11821 =

Clinical data
- Other names: NS11821
- Routes of administration: Oral
- Drug class: GABA_{A} receptor positive allosteric modulator; Nonbenzodiazepine; Anxiolytic
- ATC code: None

Pharmacokinetic data
- Onset of action: 0.5–4.0 hours (T_{max})
- Elimination half-life: 0.62–5.0 hours

NS-11821, or NS11821 is a GABA_{A} receptor positive allosteric modulator and nonbenzodiazepine which was under development for the treatment of anxiety disorders and CNS disorders but was never marketed. It is taken orally.

The drug is a subunit-selective partial positive allosteric modulator of the GABA_{A} receptor. More specifically, it shows affinity (K_{i}) values of 1.6 nM at α_{1}, 9.7 nM at α_{2}, 3.8 nM at α_{3}, and 2.5 nM at α_{5}, whereas it shows EC_{50} (E_{max}) values of ND (4%) at α_{1}, 59 nM (17%) at α_{2}, 73 nM (40%) at α_{3}, and 44 nM (41%) at α_{5}. Based on animal studies, this is expected to translate into a profile of anxiolytic effects with low propensity for sedation. Clinical findings of NS-11821 in humans have been described.

NS-11821 was under development by NeuroSearch. It reached phase 1 clinical trials for both anxiety disorders and CNS disorders prior to the discontinuation of its development in 2017. The chemical structure of NS-11821 does not yet appear to have been disclosed.

== See also ==
- List of investigational anxiety disorder drugs
