= MRK-409 =

Abandoned drug

Names
- IUPAC name 7-Cyclobutyl-3-(2,6-difluorophenyl)-6-[(2-methyl-1,2,4-triazol-3-yl)methoxy]-[1,2,4]triazolo[4,3-b]pyridazine
- Other names: MK-0343; 1,2,4-Triazolo(4,3-b)pyridazine, 7-cyclobutyl-3-(2,6-difluorophenyl)-6-((1-methyl-1H-1,2,4-triazol-5-yl)methoxy)-

Identifiers
CAS Number	233275-76-8
3D model (JSmol)	Interactive image
ChEMBL	ChEMBL4303594
ChemSpider	11499267
DrugBank	DB13993
PubChem CID	22609888
UNII	9VSE02330I
CompTox Dashboard (EPA)	DTXSID101016659
- InChI: InChI=1S/C19H17F2N7O/c1-27-16(22-10-23-27)9-29-19-12(11-4-2-5-11)8-15-24-25-18(28(15)26-19)17-13(20)6-3-7-14(17)21/h3,6-8,10-11H,2,4-5,9H2,1H3 Key: GOIFCXRIFSYPFG-UHFFFAOYSA-N
- SMILES: CN1C(=NC=N1)COC2=NN3C(=NN=C3C4=C(C=CC=C4F)F)C=C2C5CCC5

Properties
Chemical formula	C_{19}H_{17}F_{2}N_{7}O
Molar mass	397.390 g·mol^{−1}
- Except where otherwise noted, data are given for materials in their standard state (at 25 °C [77 °F], 100 kPa). Infobox references

MRK-409, also known as MK-0343, is a GABA_{A} receptor partial agonist.

It was designed to be a non-sedative anxiolytic, however its development was halted because it produced sedation in humans.

== Pharmacodynamics ==
Despite lacking the benzodiazepine chemical structure, MRK-409 acts on the benzodiazepine binding site, it is therefore a nonbenzodiazepine.

MRK-409 binds to the α1, α2, α3 and α5 subunits of the GABA_{A} receptor.

In rats, it produces minimal to no sedation, however it produces sedation in humans at doses above 1 mg.

== See also ==
- ENX-102 (TPA-023B)
