= PRAX-114 =

Experimental psychiatric drug

Clinical data
- Other names: PRAX114
- Routes of administration: Oral
- Drug class: Neurosteroid; GABA_{A} receptor positive allosteric modulator

PRAX-114 is a neurosteroid and GABA_{A} receptor positive allosteric modulator which is under development for the treatment of major depressive disorder, essential tremor, depressive disorders, and epilepsy. It was also under development for the treatment of post-traumatic stress disorder (PTSD), but development for this indication was discontinued. The drug is taken by mouth.

PRAX-114 is described as an extrasynaptic-preferring GABA_{A} receptor positive allosteric modulator with a wider separation between antidepressant-like activity and sedative effects in preclinical research than related drugs like zuranolone. It has 10.5-fold preference for potentation of extrasynaptic GABA_{A} receptors over synaptic GABA_{A} receptors in vitro. Hence, the drug is theorized to have improved tolerability. PRAX-114 shows antidepressant-like, anxiolytic-like, and, at higher doses, sedative effects in animals.

As of March 2023, PRAX-114 is in phase 2/3 clinical trials for major depressive disorder and phase 2 clinical trials for essential tremor. No recent development has been reported for treatment of depressive disorders and epilepsy. In a June 2023 literature review, it was reported that PRAX-114 had failed to show effectiveness in the treatment of major depressive disorder in a phase 2/3 trial and that there were no further plans to develop PRAX-114 for treatment of psychiatric disorders. The drug is or was under development by Praxis Pharmaceuticals. Aside from being a small molecule and neurosteroid, the chemical structure of PRAX-114 does not seem to have been disclosed.

== See also ==
- List of investigational antidepressants
- List of investigational post-traumatic stress disorder drugs
