= Itasetron =

Clinical data
- Other names: DAU-6215; DAU6215; U-98079; U98079
- Routes of administration: Oral
- Drug class: Serotonin 5-HT_{3} receptor antagonist
- ATC code: None

Pharmacokinetic data
- Bioavailability: 68%
- Elimination half-life: 10.6–12.4 hours

Identifiers
- IUPAC name: N-[(1R,5S)-8-methyl-8-azabicyclo[3.2.1]octan-3-yl]-2-oxo-3H-benzimidazole-1-carboxamide
- CAS Number: 123258-84-4 127618-28-4 (hydrochloride)
- PubChem CID: 6918106
- ChemSpider: 16736654
- UNII: 00S0D0OEKR
- ChEBI: CHEBI:140079
- ChEMBL: ChEMBL4765211
- CompTox Dashboard (EPA): DTXSID9048803

Chemical and physical data
- Formula: C_{16}H_{20}N_{4}O_{2}
- Molar mass: 300.362 g·mol^{−1}
- 3D model (JSmol): Interactive image
- SMILES: CN1[C@@H]2CC[C@H]1CC(C2)NC(=O)N3C4=CC=CC=C4NC3=O
- InChI: InChI=1S/C16H20N4O2/c1-19-11-6-7-12(19)9-10(8-11)17-15(21)20-14-5-3-2-4-13(14)18-16(20)22/h2-5,10-12H,6-9H2,1H3,(H,17,21)(H,18,22)/t10?,11-,12+; Key:RWXRJSRJIITQAK-YOGCLGLASA-N

Itasetron (INN, USAN; developmental code names DAU-6215 and U-98079) is a selective serotonin 5-HT_{3} receptor antagonist which was under development for the treatment of anxiety disorders, cognition disorders, nausea and vomiting, and psychotic disorders but was never marketed. It is taken orally. Itasetron was first described in the scientific literature by 1990. The drug was under development by Boehringer Ingelheim. It reached phase 3 clinical trials for nausea and vomiting and phase 2 trials for anxiety disorders.

== See also ==
- List of investigational antipsychotics
- List of investigational anxiety disorder drugs
- List of investigational cognition and memory disorder drugs
