= Non-racemic MDMA =

- (R)-MDMA (top) and (S)-MDMA (bottom)

Combination of
- (R)-MDMA: Entactogen; Serotonin–norepinephrine releasing agent (SNRA)
- (S)-MDMA: Entactogen; Serotonin–norepinephrine–dopamine releasing agent (SNDRA)

Clinical data
- Other names: Non-racemic midomafetamine; Non-racemic ecstasy; ALA-002; ALA002; ALA-02; ALA02; AM-1002; AM1002

Non-racemic MDMA, also known by the developmental code names ALA-002 and AM-1002, are non-racemic mixtures of the MDMA (midomafetamine; "ecstasy") enantiomers (R)-MDMA and (S)-MDMA which are under development for the treatment of social phobia (social anxiety disorder; SAD), autistic spectrum disorder (ASD), and generalized anxiety disorder (GAD). ALA-002, which is under development by PharmAla Biotech for social phobia and autistic spectrum disorders, is a mixture of 70–80% (R)-MDMA and 20–30% (S)-MDMA. Conversely, AM-1002, which is under development by Arcadia Medicine for GAD, is a mixture of 90% (R)-MDMA and 10% (S)-MDMA. Based on animal studies, (R)-MDMA-preferring non-racemic MDMA mixtures show less hyperlocomotion, hyperthermia, hypertension, and neurotoxicity than racemic MDMA. ALA-002 is in phase 2 clinical trials for SAD and ASD as of 2026, whereas AM-1002 is in phase 1/2 trials for GAD as of 2026. Jupiter Neurosciences acquired the exclusive rights to develop ALA-002 in the United States from PharmAla Biotech in May 2026.

== See also ==
- List of investigational hallucinogens and entactogens
- List of investigational social anxiety disorder drugs
- List of investigational autism and pervasive developmental disorder drugs
- List of investigational generalized anxiety disorder drugs
- (R)-MDMA (EMP-01, DT402/MM402)
- APA-01 (APA-001; PharmAla-1)
