= List of investigational panic disorder drugs =

Investigational panic disorder drugs

This is a list of investigational panic disorder drugs, or drugs that are currently under development for clinical use for the treatment of panic disorder (PD) but are not yet approved.

Chemical/generic names are listed first, with developmental code names, synonyms, and brand names in parentheses. The format of list items is "Name (Synonyms) – Mechanism of Action [Reference]".

This list was last comprehensively updated in September 2025. It is likely to become outdated with time.

== Under development ==
=== Phase 2 ===
- Darigabat (CVL-865; PF-06372865; PF-6372865) – GABA_{A} receptor positive allosteric modulator
- HB-1 (HB-01) – undefined mechanism of action

=== Phase unknown ===
- Oxybutynin controlled release – muscarinic acetylcholine receptor antagonist
- Venlafaxine controlled release – serotonin–norepinephrine reuptake inhibitor (SNRI)

== Not under development ==
=== No development reported ===
- ADX-71149 (JNJ-1813; JNJ-40411813; JNJ-mGluR2-PAM) – metabotropic glutamate mGlu_{2} receptor positive allosteric modulator
- Tebideutorexant (JNJ-61393215; JNJ-3215) – orexin OX_{1} receptor antagonist

=== Discontinued ===
- Alprazolam inhalation (AZ-002; FNP-002; Staccato® alprazolam; STAP-001; UCB-7538) – GABA_{A} receptor positive allosteric modulator and benzodiazepine
- Alprazolam intranasal (Panistat) – GABA_{A} receptor positive allosteric modulator and benzodiazepine
- BTG-1640 (ABIO-08/01; ABIO-0801) – undefined mechanism of action
- Eglumetad (Eglumegad; LY-354740) – metabotropic glutamate mGlu_{2} and mGlu_{3} receptor agonist
- JNJ-19567470 (CRA-5626; R-317573) – corticotropin releasing factor receptor 1 (CRF_{1}R) antagonist
- Nefazodone (BMY-13754; Dutonin; MJ-13754; MS-13754; Nefadar; Serzone) – serotonin 5-HT_{1A} receptor ligand, serotonin 5-HT_{2A} and 5-HT_{2C} receptor antagonist, α_{1}- and α_{2}-adrenergic receptor antagonist, weak serotonin–norepinephrine–dopamine reuptake inhibitor (SNDRI), and other actions
- Xenon (NBTX-001) – ionotropic glutamate NMDA receptor antagonist

== Clinically used drugs ==
=== Approved drugs ===
- Escitalopram (Cipralex; Entact; Lexapro; LU-26054; MLD-55; (S)-citalopram; Seroplex; Sipralex; Sipralexa) – selective serotonin reuptake inhibitor (SSRI)
- Fluoxetine (LY-110140; Prozac; Reneuron; Sarafem) – selective serotonin reuptake inhibitor (SSRI)
- Fluoxetine (Fluoxetine Tablets) – selective serotonin reuptake inhibitor (SSRI)
- Paroxetine (Aropax; BRL-29060; Deroxat; Divarius; FG-7051; Frosinor; Motivan; NNC-207051; Paxil; Seroxat; SI-211103; Tagonis) – selective serotonin reuptake inhibitor (SSRI)
- Paroxetine (Dropax; Dropaxin; Serestill) – selective serotonin reuptake inhibitor (SSRI)
- Sertraline (Aremis; Besitran; CP-51974; Gladem; Lustral; Serad; Serlain; Tatig; Zoloft) – selective serotonin reuptake inhibitor (SSRI)
- Venlafaxine (Dobupal; Efexor XR; Effexor; Effexor XR; Elafax; WY-45030; WY-45651; WY-45655) – serotonin–norepinephrine reuptake inhibitor (SNRI)

=== Off-label drugs ===
- Anticonvulsants (e.g., valproic acid)
- Atypical antipsychotics (e.g., quetiapine)
- Azapirones (serotonin 5-HT_{1A} receptor agonists) (e.g., buspirone)
- Benzodiazepines (GABA_{A} receptor positive allosteric modulators) (e.g., alprazolam, chlordiazepoxide, clonazepam, diazepam, lorazepam)
- Beta blockers (e.g., propranolol)
- Gabapentinoids (α_{2}δ subunit-containing voltage-gated calcium channel ligands) (e.g., gabapentin, pregabalin)
- Monoamine oxidase inhibitors (MAOIs) (e.g., isocarboxazid, moclobemide, phenelzine, tranylcypromine)
- NMDA receptor antagonists (e.g., ketamine, esketamine)
- Selective serotonin reuptake inhibitors (SSRIs) (e.g., citalopram, fluvoxamine)
- Serotonin–norepinephrine reuptake inhibitors (SNRIs) (e.g., desvenlafaxine, duloxetine, levomilnacipran, milnacipran)
- Serotonin modulators and stimulators (SMSs) (e.g., vilazodone, vortioxetine)
- Tricyclic antidepressants (TCAs) (e.g., amitriptyline, clomipramine, doxepin, imipramine)
- Tetracyclic antidepressants (TeCAs) (e.g., mirtazapine)
- Others (e.g., hydroxyzine)

== See also ==
- List of investigational drugs
- List of investigational generalized anxiety disorder drugs
- List of investigational social anxiety disorder drugs
- List of investigational post-traumatic stress disorder drugs
- List of investigational anxiety disorder drugs
