= KM-391 =

Abandoned autism drug

Clinical data
- Other names: KM391
- Routes of administration: Oral
- Drug class: Serotonin reuptake inhibitor

KM-391 is a serotonin reuptake inhibitor which was under development for the treatment of autism but was never marketed. It is taken by mouth.

== Description ==
The drug showed activity in an animal model of autism. In this model, the serotonergic neurotoxin 5,7-dihydroxytryptamine (5,7-DHT) is injected into the forebrain of newborn rat pups and this results in neonatal serotonin depletion, development of autism-like behaviors, and reduced neuroplasticity. KM-391 was able to restore brain serotonin concentrations to near-normal levels, restore normal behaviors, and increase neuroplasticity. Moreover, it was more efficacious than fluoxetine in this model. KM-391 also diminished the intensification of autism-like behaviors, such as repetitive behaviors and sensitivity to touch, that occurred when an oxytocin receptor antagonist was added in the model.

KM-391 was under development by Cellceutix Corporation (now Innovation Pharmaceuticals). It remained under development as late as 2012 and reached the preclinical research stage of development for autism. However, its development was eventually suspended.

== See also ==
- Zolmitriptan § Social deficits and aggression
