= PT-00114 =

Clinical data
- Other names: PT100114; TCAP-1
- Routes of administration: Subcutaneous injection
- Drug class: Corticotropin-releasing hormone (CRH) inhibitor

PT-00114, also known as TCAP-1, is a corticotropin-releasing hormone (CRH) inhibitor which is under development for the treatment of generalized anxiety disorder, major depressive disorder, opioid-related disorders, post-traumatic stress disorder (PTSD), and mood disorders. It is taken by subcutaneous injection. The drug is a synthetic analogue of the teneurin C-terminal associated peptides (TCAP) and is a 41-amino acid peptide. It has been reported to produce anxiolytic-like effects in animals, among other effects. PT-00114 is under development by Protagenic Therapeutics and Charles River Laboratories. As of August 2025, it is in phase 1/2 clinical trials for generalized anxiety disorder, major depressive disorder, opioid-related disorders, and PTSD and is in phase 1 trials for mood disorders. It is or was also under development for the treatment of other anxiety and depressive disorders as well as of impulse control disorders and neurodegenerative disorders, but no recent development has been reported for these indications.

== See also ==
- List of investigational antidepressants
- List of investigational generalized anxiety disorder drugs
- List of investigational post-traumatic stress disorder drugs
- List of investigational substance-related disorder drugs
- Corticotropin-releasing hormone antagonist
