= SPT-320 =

Clinical data
- Other names: SPT320; LYT-320; LYT320
- Routes of administration: Oral
- Drug class: Melatonin receptor agonist; Serotonin 5-HT_{2B} receptor antagonist; Serotonin 5-HT_{2C} receptor antagonist;

SPT-320, also formerly known as LYT-320, is a prodrug of agomelatine which is under development for the treatment of mood and anxiety disorders, for instance generalized anxiety disorder.

As an agomelatine prodrug, it acts as a melatonin receptor agonist and as a serotonin 5-HT_{2B} and 5-HT_{2C} receptor antagonist. The drug is taken by mouth and is said to bypass first-pass hepatic metabolism.

As of December 2023, SPT-320 is in the preclinical research phase of development. It is under development by Seaport Therapeutics and is being developed towards approval in the United States. The chemical structure of SPT-320 does not yet appear to have been disclosed.
