= AVN-397 =

Drug possibly to treat Alzheimer's disease

AVN-397 is a 5-hydroxytryptamine subtype 6 receptor antagonist drug developed by Avineuro Pharmaceuticals Inc. that can potentially be used to treat Alzheimer's disease and general anxiety disorder (GAD). Avineuro announced that it would start Phase II clinical trials in 2009, and those trials were ongoing as of 2012. Phase II trials are now listed as Discontinued.
