= AXS-17 =

Clinical data
- Other names: AXS17; BAER101; AZD7325; AZ-7325; AZ7325
- Drug class: GABA_{A} receptor positive allosteric modulator; Nonbenzodiazepine
- ATC code: None

Identifiers
- IUPAC name: 4-amino-8-(2-fluoro-6-methoxyphenyl)-N-propylcinnoline-3-carboxamide
- CAS Number: 942437-37-8
- PubChem CID: 23581869
- DrugBank: DB13994
- ChemSpider: 26334679
- UNII: KNM216XOUH
- ChEMBL: ChEMBL1783282

Chemical and physical data
- Formula: C_{19}H_{19}FN_{4}O_{2}
- Molar mass: 354.385 g·mol^{−1}
- 3D model (JSmol): Interactive image
- SMILES: CCCNC(=O)C1=NN=C2C(=C1N)C=CC=C2C3=C(C=CC=C3F)OC
- InChI: InChI=1S/C19H19FN4O2/c1-3-10-22-19(25)18-16(21)12-7-4-6-11(17(12)23-24-18)15-13(20)8-5-9-14(15)26-2/h4-9H,3,10H2,1-2H3,(H2,21,23)(H,22,25); Key:KYDURMHFWXCKMW-UHFFFAOYSA-N

AXS-17, also known as BAER-101 or as AZD-7325, is a GABA_{A} receptor positive allosteric modulator and nonbenzodiazepine which is under development for the treatment of anxiety disorders and absence epilepsy. It is or was also under development for autism spectrum disorder, fragile X syndrome, and other neurological disorders, but no recent development has been reported for these indications.

The drug is a GABA_{A} receptor α_{2} and α_{3} subunit-selective partial positive allosteric modulator acting via the benzodiazepine site. It might have reduced side effects compared to non-selective high-efficacy positive allosteric modulators like the benzodiazepines diazepam and lorazepam. In terms of chemical structure, AXS-17 is a cinnoline derivative.

AXS-17 was originated by AstraZeneca and the University College London. It was licensed and under development by Avenue Therapeutics's Baergic Bio, but was later acquired by Axsome Therapeutics, which is now developing the drug. As of November 2025, AXS-17 is in phase 2 clinical trials for anxiety disorders and is in the preclinical research stage of development for absence epilepsy. AXS-17 was first described in the scientific literature by at least 2012.

== See also ==
- List of investigational anxiety disorder drugs
