= Troriluzole =

Chemical compound

Clinical data
- Other names: Vyglxia, Trigriluzole, BHV-4157, FC-4157
- Routes of administration: By mouth
- ATC code: N07XX23 (WHO)

Identifiers
- IUPAC name: 2-Amino-N-[2-[methyl-[2-oxo-2-[[6-(trifluoromethoxy)-1,3-benzothiazol-2-yl]amino]ethyl]amino]-2-oxoethyl]acetamide
- CAS Number: 1926203-09-9
- PubChem CID: 121488186
- DrugBank: DB15079
- ChemSpider: 58828005
- UNII: S7H48S6K7H
- KEGG: D11414
- ChEMBL: ChEMBL4297586

Chemical and physical data
- Formula: C_{15}H_{16}F_{3}N_{5}O_{4}S
- Molar mass: 419.38 g·mol^{−1}
- 3D model (JSmol): Interactive image
- SMILES: CN(CC(=O)NC1=NC2=C(S1)C=C(C=C2)OC(F)(F)F)C(=O)CNC(=O)CN
- InChI: InChI=1S/C15H16F3N5O4S/c1-23(13(26)6-20-11(24)5-19)7-12(25)22-14-21-9-3-2-8(4-10(9)28-14)27-15(16,17)18/h2-4H,5-7,19H2,1H3,(H,20,24)(H,21,22,25); Key:YBZSGIWIPOUSHY-UHFFFAOYSA-N

Troriluzole is an experimental medication that has been investigated as a potential treatment for Machado–Joseph disease (MJD), obsessive–compulsive disorder (OCD),, spinocerebellar ataxia (SCA), and glioblastoma. It is a prodrug modification of the medication riluzole.

== Pharmacology ==
=== Pharmacokinetics ===
While riluzole is typically taken twice-daily and on an empty stomach, troriluzole may offer a potential once-daily dosing with or without food along with greater bioavailability.

== Research ==
In 2024, researchers published a study in the Journal of Neurochemistry that reported troriluzole could reverse some early Alzheimer's disease brain changes in mice, reduce harmful glutamate levels, and improve memory and learning abilities.
