= Soclenicant =

Chemical compound

Clinical data
- Other names: BNC210; BNC-210; IW2143; IW-2143
- Routes of administration: Oral
- Drug class: α_{7}-Nicotinic acetylcholine receptor negative allosteric modulator
- ATC code: None

Legal status
- Legal status: Investigational

Pharmacokinetic data
- Bioavailability: 69.4% (rat)
- Protein binding: 70–88%
- Elimination half-life: 6.2 hours (rat)

Identifiers
- IUPAC name: 6-((2,3-dihydro-1H-inden-2-yl)amino)-1-ethyl-3-(4-morpholinylcarbonyl)-1,8-naphthyridin-4(1H)-one
- CAS Number: 1020634-41-6
- PubChem CID: 24772165
- UNII: QP49AY37OY
- KEGG: D13360

Chemical and physical data
- Formula: C_{24}H_{26}N_{4}O_{3}
- Molar mass: 418.497 g·mol^{−1}
- 3D model (JSmol): Interactive image
- SMILES: CCN1C=C(C(=O)C2=C1N=CC(=C2)NC3CC4=CC=CC=C4C3)C(=O)N5CCOCC5
- InChI: InChI=1S/C24H26N4O3/c1-2-28-22-19-7-3-4-8-20(19)24(30)27-23(22)26-21-13-14-15-16-17-21/h3-8,13-17,26H,2,9-12H2,1H3; Key:XYCMUJUHXRZPMP-UHFFFAOYSA-N

Soclenicant (INN), also known by its developmental code names BNC210 and IW-2143, is an antinicotinic agent which is under development for the treatment of anxiety disorders such as social phobia and generalized anxiety disorder, as well as for treatment of agitation, post-traumatic stress disorder (PTSD), and depressive disorders. It is taken by mouth.

The drug acts as a highly selective negative allosteric modulator (NAM) of the α_{7}-nicotinic acetylcholine receptor (α_{7}-nAChR). It produces anxiolytic-, anti-stress-, and antidepressant-like effects without causing sedation, memory or motor impairment, or physical dependence in rodents. Chemically, soclenicant is a synthetic heterocyclic small-molecule compound based on a 1,8-naphthyridin-4-one scaffold, bearing amide and amine functionalities.

Soclenicant is being developed by Bionomics. It has also been developed by Ironwood Pharmaceuticals and EmpathBio. Bionomics was acquired by Neuphoria Therapeutics in December 2024. As of December 2024, soclenicant is in phase 3 clinical trials for anxiety disorders, phase 2 trials for agitation and PTSD, and no recent development has been reported for depressive disorders. The drug received Fast Track designation from the United States Food and Drug Administration (FDA) in 2019. It was first described in the literature, in a conference abstract, by 2007.

== See also ==
- List of investigational anxiolytics
- List of investigational social anxiety disorder drugs
- 5-Hydroxyindoleacetic acid
- Desformylflustrabromine
- Kynurenic acid
