= Riluzole =

Medication used to treat amyotrophic lateral sclerosis

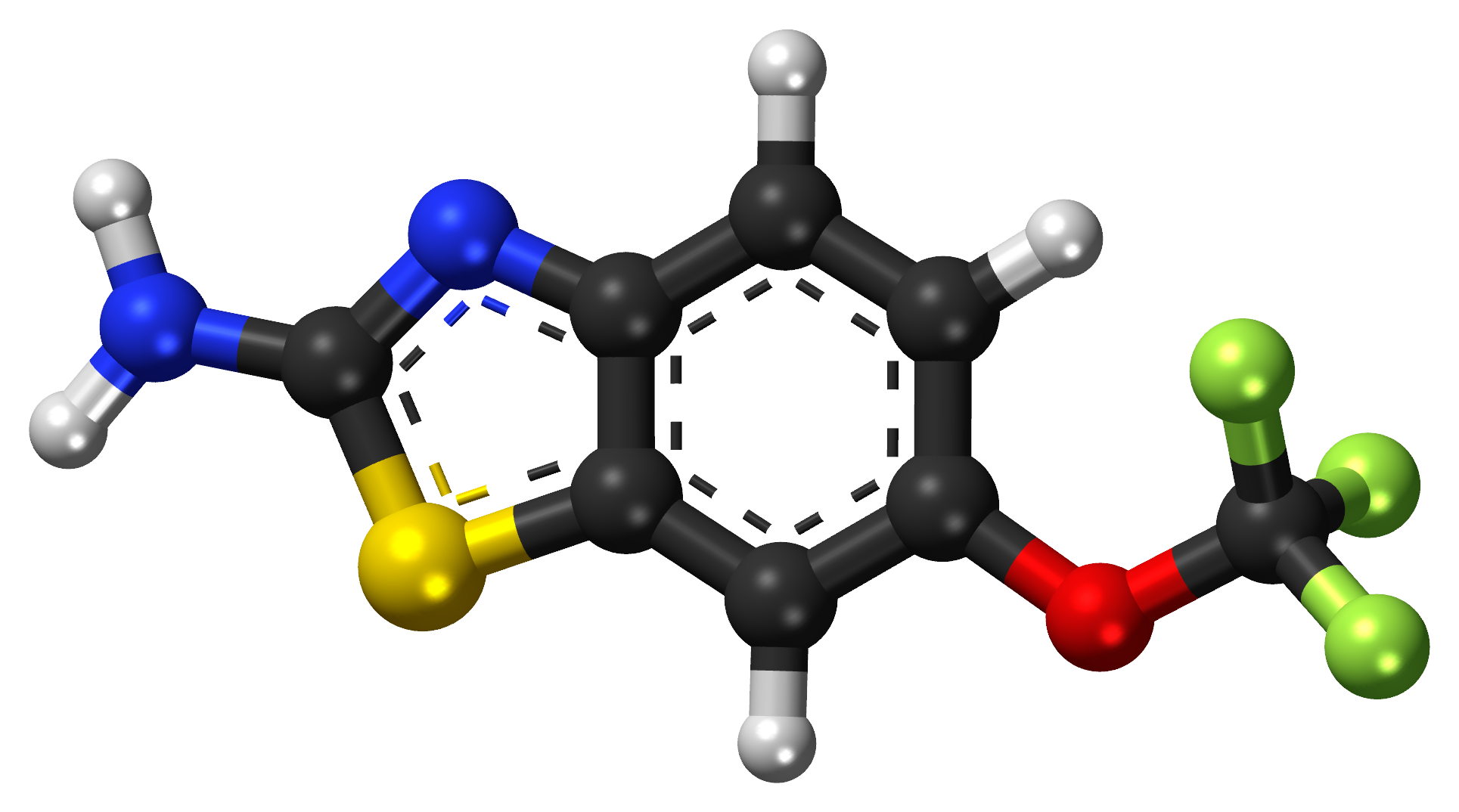

Clinical data
- Trade names: Rilutek, Tiglutik, Exservan, others
- AHFS/Drugs.com: Monograph
- MedlinePlus: a696013
- Pregnancy category: AU: B3
- Routes of administration: By mouth
- ATC code: N07XX02 (WHO)

Legal status
- Legal status: AU: S4 (Prescription only); CA: ℞-only; UK: POM (Prescription only); US: ℞-only; EU: Rx Only

Pharmacokinetic data
- Bioavailability: 60±18%
- Protein binding: 97%
- Metabolism: Hepatic (CYP1A2)
- Elimination half-life: 9–15 hours
- Excretion: Urine (90%)

Identifiers
- IUPAC name: 6-(trifluoromethoxy)benzothiazol-2-amine
- CAS Number: 1744-22-5
- PubChem CID: 5070
- IUPHAR/BPS: 2326
- DrugBank: DB00740
- ChemSpider: 4892
- UNII: 7LJ087RS6F
- KEGG: D00775
- ChEMBL: ChEMBL744
- CompTox Dashboard (EPA): DTXSID3045192
- ECHA InfoCard: 100.124.754

Chemical and physical data
- Formula: C_{8}H_{5}F_{3}N_{2}OS
- Molar mass: 234.20 g·mol^{−1}
- 3D model (JSmol): Interactive image
- SMILES: FC(F)(F)Oc1ccc2nc(sc2c1)N
- InChI: InChI=1S/C8H5F3N2OS/c9-8(10,11)14-4-1-2-5-6(3-4)15-7(12)13-5/h1-3H,(H2,12,13); Key:FTALBRSUTCGOEG-UHFFFAOYSA-N

Riluzole is a medication used to treat amyotrophic lateral sclerosis (ALS) and other motor neuron diseases. Riluzole delays the onset of ventilator-dependence or tracheostomy in some people and may increase survival by two to three months. Riluzole is available in tablet and liquid form. A thin film version of riluzole which dissolves on the tongue (commercially known as Exservan or Emylif) is available in the United States and United Kingdom.

== Medical uses ==
=== Amyotrophic lateral sclerosis ===
Riluzole was approved in the United States for the treatment of ALS by the US Food and Drug Administration (FDA) in 1995. In 1996, riluzole was approved for use in treating ALS by the European Medicines Agency (EMA). A Cochrane Library review states a 9% gain in the probability of surviving one year.

== Contraindications ==
Contraindications for riluzole include: known prior hypersensitivity to riluzole or any of the excipients inside the preparations, liver disease, pregnancy or lactation.

== Adverse effects ==
- Very common (>10% frequency): nausea; weakness; decreased lung function
- Common (1–10% frequency): headache; dizziness; drowsiness; vomiting; abdominal pain; increased aminotransferases
- Uncommon (0.1–1% frequency): pancreatitis; interstitial lung disease
- Rare (<0.1% frequency): neutropenia; allergic reaction (including angiooedema, anaphylactoid reaction)

=== Overdose ===
Symptoms of overdose include: neurological and psychiatric symptoms, acute toxic encephalopathy with stupor, coma and methemoglobinemia. Severe methemoglobinemia may be rapidly reversible after treatment with methylene blue.

== Interactions ==
CYP1A2 substrates, inhibitors and inducers would probably interact with riluzole, due to its dependency on this cytochrome for metabolism.

== Mechanism of action ==
Riluzole preferentially blocks TTX-sensitive sodium channels, which are associated with damaged neurons. Riluzole has also been reported to directly inhibit the kainate and NMDA receptors. The drug has also been shown to postsynaptically potentiate GABA_{A} receptors via an allosteric binding site. However, the action of riluzole on glutamate receptors has been controversial, as no binding of the drug to any known sites has been shown for them. In addition, as its antiglutamatergic action is still detectable in the presence of sodium channel blockers, it is also uncertain whether or not it acts via this way. Rather, its ability to stimulate glutamate uptake seems to mediate many of its effects. In addition to its role in accelerating glutamate clearance from the synapse, riluzole may also prevent glutamate release from presynaptic terminals.

== Synthesis ==
Riluzole can be prepared beginning with the reaction of 4-(trifluoromethoxy)aniline with potassium thiocyanate followed by reaction with bromine, forming the thiazole ring.

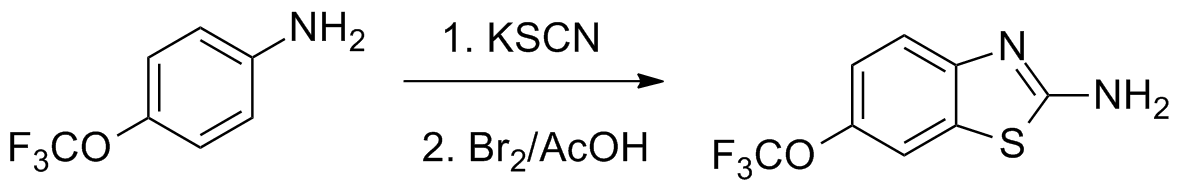
Riluzole synthesis

== Society and culture ==
=== Legal status ===
Riluzole was approved for medical use in the European Union in October 1996.

== Research ==
A number of case studies and randomized controlled trials have indicated that riluzole, which is neuroprotective and a glutamate modulator, may have use in mood and anxiety disorders. Riluzole is thought to have "neuroprotective" properties mainly owing to its ability to modulate glutamate release. However, it failed in trials of Huntington's disease and Parkinson's disease. A 2024 study comparing the effects of riluzole in patients with traumatic spinal cord injury to a control group found riluzole treated patients had higher American Spinal Injury Association (ASIA) motor scores and lower mortality rates at 3 months, though the scores were not statistically significant.

Riluzole has been investigated in rodent models for its potential ability to protect against noise-induced hearing loss (NIHL) and cisplatin-induced ototoxicity. These protective effects are believed to be caused by riluzole's antioxidant and anti-apoptotic properties, but other mechanisms, including modulation of glutamate signaling, are also being investigated. However, further research, especially in human trials, is necessary to confirm these findings and establish riluzole's clinical efficacy for treating hearing loss.

A sublingual reformulation of riluzole that originated at Yale University and is known by the code name BHV-0223 is under development for the treatment of generalized anxiety disorder and mood disorders by Biohaven Pharmaceuticals. A prodrug formulation of riluzole, troriluzole, has been researched as a potential treatment for several different conditions.

== See also ==
- List of investigational antidepressants
- List of investigational obsessive–compulsive disorder drugs
- List of investigational Parkinson's disease drugs
