= Darigabat =

Chemical compound

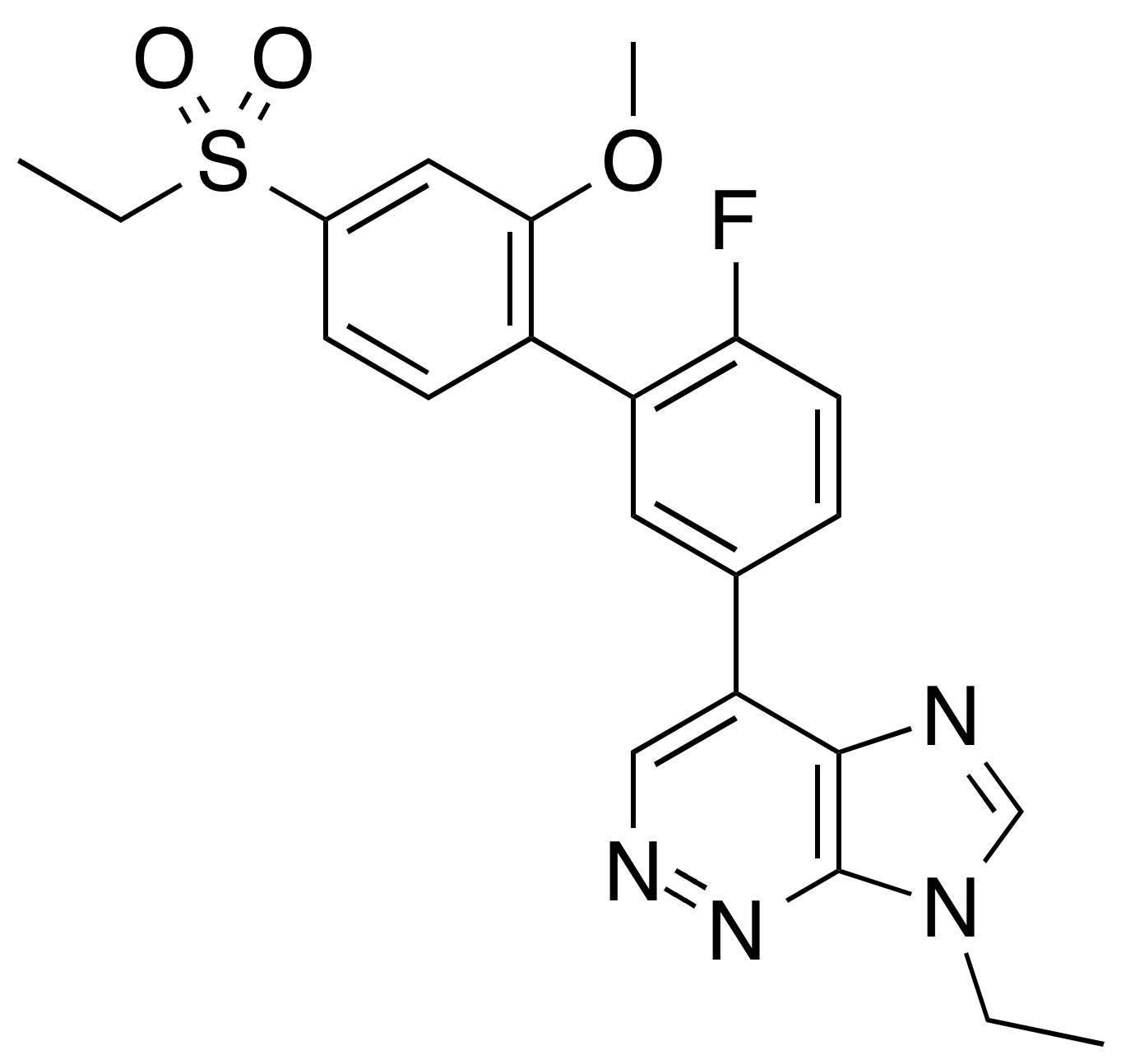

Clinical data
- Other names: CVL-865; PF-06372865; PF-6372865
- Routes of administration: By mouth
- Drug class: GABA_{A} receptor positive allosteric modulator

Pharmacokinetic data
- Metabolism: CYP3A4
- Elimination half-life: 11 hours

Identifiers
- IUPAC name: 7-ethyl-4-[3-(4-ethylsulfonyl-2-methoxyphenyl)-4-fluorophenyl]imidazo[4,5-c]pyridazine
- CAS Number: 1614245-70-3
- PubChem CID: 76287260
- IUPHAR/BPS: 9798
- ChemSpider: 58950370
- UNII: O9BP19HZ3Q
- ChEMBL: ChEMBL3647536

Chemical and physical data
- Formula: C_{22}H_{21}FN_{4}O_{3}S
- Molar mass: 440.49 g·mol^{−1}
- 3D model (JSmol): Interactive image
- SMILES: CCN1C=NC2=C1N=NC=C2C3=CC(=C(C=C3)F)C4=C(C=C(C=C4)S(=O)(=O)CC)OC
- InChI: InChI=1S/C22H21FN4O3S/c1-4-27-13-24-21-18(12-25-26-22(21)27)14-6-9-19(23)17(10-14)16-8-7-15(11-20(16)30-3)31(28,29)5-2/h6-13H,4-5H2,1-3H3; Key:PTTQXDBPTFOCMT-UHFFFAOYSA-N

Darigabat (developmental code names CVL-865, PF-06372865, PF-6372865) is a GABAergic medication which is under development for the treatment of photosensitive epilepsy, focal onset seizures, panic disorder, and other anxiety disorders. It was also under development for the treatment of generalized anxiety disorder and chronic lower back pain, but development for these indications was discontinued. It is taken via oral administration.

Darigabat acts as a GABA_{A} receptor positive allosteric modulator It is specifically a positive allosteric modulator that selectively targets α_{2}, α_{3}, and α_{5} subunit-containing GABA_{A} receptors, with minimal functional activity at α_{1} subunit-containing GABA_{A} receptors. A dose of darigabat that achieved more than 80% receptor occupancy showed no somnolence with dose titration, whereas benzodiazepines, which are non-selective GABA_{A} receptor positive allosteric modulators, achieve only 10 to 15% receptor occupancy whilst producing significant or severe somnolence. It is theorized that α_{1} subunit-containing GABA_{A} receptors preferentially mediate sedation, amnesia, and ataxia, whereas α_{2} and α_{3} subunit-containing GABA_{A} receptors mediate anxiolysis. However, this model has also been questioned. α_{1} subunit-containing GABA_{A} receptors are said to be completely unaffected by darigabat. The elimination half-life of darigabat is 11 hours and it is metabolized mainly by CYP3A4.

In clinical trials conducted thus far, side effects of darigabat have included dizziness, fatigue, headache, mild-to-moderate somnolence, bradyphrenia (slowness of thought), modest memory impairment, mild cognitive impairment, balance impairment, and feeling abnormal. It has been described as well-tolerated.

Darigabat was originated by Pfizer and is under development by Cerevel Therapeutics and Pfizer. As of January 2023, it is in phase 2 clinical trials for epilepsy and seizures, phase 1 trials for panic disorder, and preclinical development for anxiety disorders. Development for back pain was discontinued due to lack of effectiveness in a phase 2 trial, while development for generalized anxiety disorder was discontinued due to business reasons as well as lack of effectiveness in a phase 2 trial.

== See also ==
- List of investigational anxiolytics
