= L-655,708 =

Chemical compound

Identifiers
- IUPAC name: ethyl (13aS)-7-methoxy-9-oxo-11,12,13,13a-tetrahydro-9H-imidazo[1,5-a]pyrrolo[2,1-c][1,4]benzodiazepine-1-carboxylate
- CAS Number: 130477-52-0
- PubChem CID: 5311203
- ChemSpider: 4470723
- UNII: L4BX842T8C
- ChEMBL: ChEMBL52030
- CompTox Dashboard (EPA): DTXSID901017625

Chemical and physical data
- Formula: C_{18}H_{19}N_{3}O_{4}
- Molar mass: 341.367 g·mol^{−1}
- 3D model (JSmol): Interactive image
- SMILES: CCOC(=O)c1c2n(cn1)-c3ccc(cc3C(=O)N4[C@H]2CCC4)OC
- InChI: InChI=1S/C18H19N3O4/c1-3-25-18(23)15-16-14-5-4-8-20(14)17(22)12-9-11(24-2)6-7-13(12)21(16)10-19-15/h6-7,9-10,14H,3-5,8H2,1-2H3/t14-/m0/s1; Key:YKYOQIXTECBVBB-AWEZNQCLSA-N

L-655,708 (FG-8094) is a nootropic drug invented in 1996 by a team working for Merck, Sharp and Dohme, that was the first compound developed which acts as a subtype-selective inverse agonist at the α_{5} subtype of the benzodiazepine binding site on the GABA_{A} receptor. It acts as an inverse agonist at the α_{1}, α_{2}, α_{3} and α_{5} subtypes, but with much higher affinity for α_{5}, and unlike newer α_{5} inverse agonists such as α_{5}IA, L-655,708 exerts its subtype selectivity purely via higher binding affinity for this receptor subtype, with its efficacy as an inverse agonist being around the same at all the subtypes it binds to.

A radiolabelled form of L-655,708 was used to map the distribution of the GABA_{A} α_{5} subtype in the brain, and it was found to be expressed predominantly in the hippocampus, an area of the brain involved with learning and memory. Activation of this subtype is thought to be largely responsible for producing the cognitive side effects displayed by many benzodiazepine and nonbenzodiazepine drugs, such as amnesia and difficulties with learning and memory, and so this led researchers to conclude that a drug acting as an inverse agonist at this subtype should have the opposite effect and enhance learning and memory.

L-655,708 was indeed found to produce improved cognitive performance in animal studies, without producing the side effect of convulsions which is produced by non-selective inverse agonists like DMCM. However it was found to be anxiogenic at doses which enhanced cognition, most likely because of its inverse agonist effects on other subtypes such as α_{2} and α_{3}, making it unlikely that this drug would be suitable for use as a nootropic in humans. Still, L-655,708 may find use in the clinic to combat postoperative cognitive dysfunction since administration of sub-nootropic doses of L-655,708 prevented persistent memory impairment in mice anesthetized with isoflurane.

A study from 2015 found that L-655,708, and another α_{5} subunit-containing GABA_{A} receptor-selective negative allosteric modulator, MRK-016, produced rapid, ketamine-like antidepressant effects in animal models of depression.

== See also ==
- GABA_{A} receptor negative allosteric modulator
- GABA_{A} receptor § Ligands
- PNV-001
