= Suritozole =

Chemical compound

Clinical data
- ATC code: none

Identifiers
- IUPAC name: 5-(3-fluorophenyl)-2,4-dimethyl-2,4-dihydro-3H-1,2,4-triazole-3-thione
- CAS Number: 110623-33-1
- PubChem CID: 25431
- ChemSpider: 23743
- UNII: 3H7H68317X
- KEGG: D05980
- CompTox Dashboard (EPA): DTXSID10149333

Chemical and physical data
- Formula: C_{10}H_{10}FN_{3}S
- Molar mass: 223.27 g·mol^{−1}
- 3D model (JSmol): Interactive image
- SMILES: Cn1c(=S)n(C)nc1-c2cccc(F)c2
- InChI: InChI=1S/C10H10FN3S/c1-13-9(12-14(2)10(13)15)7-4-3-5-8(11)6-7/h3-6H,1-2H3; Key:IWDUZEHNLHFBRZ-UHFFFAOYSA-N

Suritozole (MDL 26,479) is an investigational cognition enhancer. It acts as a partial inverse agonist at the benzodiazepine receptor site on the GABA_{A} ion channel complex, but does not have either anxiogenic or convulsant effects, unlike other BZD inverse agonists such as DMCM. It was investigated for the treatment of depression and Alzheimer's disease in the 90s, but clinical development seems to have been discontinued.

== Synthesis ==
Synthesis: ~85%: Patents: etc

The reaction between monomethylhydrazine [60-34-4] (1) and methyl isothiocyanate (Trapex) [556-61-6] (2) gave 2,4-dimethylthiosemicarbazide [6621-75-6] (3). Amide formation with 3-fluorobenzoyl chloride [1711-07-5] (4) yielded 1-(3-fluorobenzoyl)-2,4-dimethylthiosemicarbazide [110623-52-4] (5). Cyclization to Suritozole (6).

== See also ==
- GABA_{A} receptor negative allosteric modulator
- GABA_{A} receptor § Ligands
