= GABAA receptor negative allosteric modulator =

Drug class

A GABA_{A} receptor negative allosteric modulator is a negative allosteric modulator (NAM), or inhibitor, of the GABA_{A} receptor, a ligand-gated ion channel of the major inhibitory neurotransmitter γ-aminobutyric acid (GABA). They are closely related and similar to GABA_{A} receptor antagonists. The effects of GABA_{A} receptor NAMs are functionally the opposite of those of GABA_{A} receptor positive allosteric modulators (PAMs) like the benzodiazepines, barbiturates, and ethanol (alcohol). Non-selective GABA_{A} receptor NAMs can produce a variety of effects including convulsions, neurotoxicity, and anxiety, among others.

Selective NAMs (or "inverse agonists") of α_{5} subunit-containing GABA_{A} receptors, such as basmisanil and α_{5}IA, do not have convulsant or anxiogenic effects but instead show cognitive- and memory-enhancing or nootropic-like effects. They are under investigation for the treatment of cognitive impairment in conditions like Down syndrome and schizophrenia. In addition, the selective α_{5} subunit-containing GABA_{A} receptor NAMs L-655,708 and MRK-016 have been found to produce rapid-acting antidepressant effects in animals similar to those of the NMDA receptor antagonist ketamine, and are of interest for the potential treatment of depression. Additional selective α_{5} subunit-containing GABA_{A} receptor NAMs include PNV-001, PWZ-029, Ro4938581, and TB-21007.

Certain drugs show weak GABA_{A} receptor NAM activity as an off-target activity that is responsible for undesirable side effects like anxiety, insomnia, and seizures. Examples include fluoroquinolone antibiotics like ciprofloxacin, β-lactam antibiotics like penicillin, ceftriaxone, and imipenem, nonsteroidal antiandrogens like enzalutamide and apalutamide, and the antidepressant bupropion.

Other GABA_{A} NAMs, mostly non-selective, include amentoflavone, bemegride, bilobalide, cicutoxin, dieldrin, FG-7142, fipronil, flurothyl, iomazenil, laudanosine, lindane, oenanthotoxin, pentylenetetrazol, phenylsilatrane, picrotoxin, radequinil, Ro15-4513, sarmazenil, suritozole, terbequinil, tetramethylenedisulfotetramine (TETS), and ZK-93426 as well as the endogenous neurosteroids dehydroepiandrosterone sulfate (DHEA-S), pregnenolone sulfate, epipregnanolone, and isopregnanolone. Some naturally occurring GABA_{A} receptor NAMs like cicutoxin and picrotoxin are considered to be toxins. Other GABA_{A} receptor NAMs like dieldrin and fipronil are used as insecticides (IRAC group 2), and TETS is used as a rodenticide, and yet other GABA_{A} receptor NAMs like bemegride, flurothyl, and pentylenetetrazol are used for clinical purposes.

== See also ==
- GABA_{A} receptor positive allosteric modulator
- AMPA receptor positive allosteric modulator
- List of investigational antidepressants
