= QH-II-66 =

Benzodiazepine sedative drug

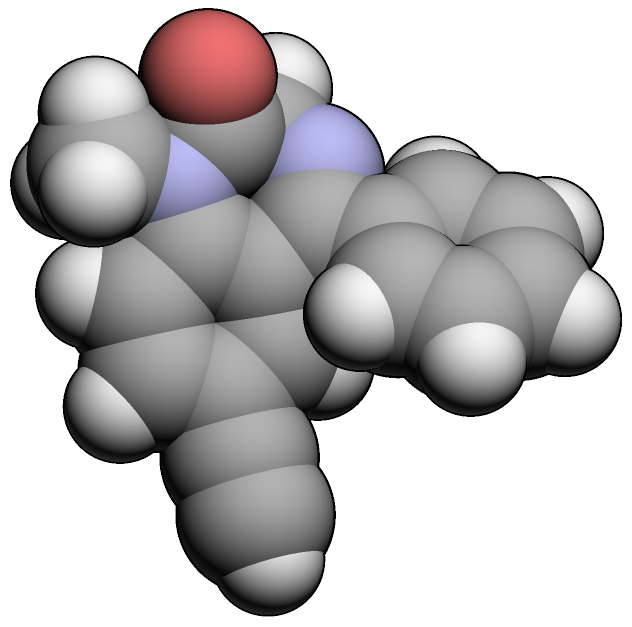

Legal status
- Legal status: CA: Schedule IV; DE: NpSG (Industrial and scientific use only); UK: Under Psychoactive Substances Act

Identifiers
- IUPAC name: 7-ethynyl-1-methyl-5-phenyl-1,3-dihydro-2H-1,4-benzodiazepin-2-one
- CAS Number: 183239-39-6
- PubChem CID: 9838431
- ChemSpider: 8014151
- UNII: PKW6UCK55B
- ChEMBL: ChEMBL174535
- CompTox Dashboard (EPA): DTXSID70431640

Chemical and physical data
- Formula: C_{18}H_{14}N_{2}O
- Molar mass: 274.323 g·mol^{−1}
- 3D model (JSmol): Interactive image
- SMILES: O=C1N(C)C2=C(C(C3=CC=CC=C3)=NC1)C=C(C=C2)C#C
- InChI: InChI=1S/C18H14N2O/c1-3-13-9-10-16-15(11-13)18(14-7-5-4-6-8-14)19-12-17(21)20(16)2/h1,4-11H,12H2,2H3; Key:FESCSZDQOFYRDR-UHFFFAOYSA-N

QH-II-66 (QH-ii-066) is a sedative drug which is a benzodiazepine derivative. It produces some of the same effects as other benzodiazepines, but is much more selective than most other drugs of this class and so produces somewhat less sedation and ataxia than other related drugs such as diazepam and triazolam, although it still retains anticonvulsant effects.

QH-ii-066 is a highly subtype-selective GABA_{A} agonist which was designed to bind selectively to the α_{5} subtype of GABA_{A} receptors.

The α_{5} subtype (and to a lesser extent the α_{1} subtype) of GABA_{A} are two of the most important targets in the brain that produce the effects of alcohol, and so one of the purposes for which QH-ii-066 was developed was to reproduce the GABAergic effects of alcohol separately from its other actions.

QH-ii-066 replicates some of the effects of alcohol, such as sedation and ataxia, but does not increase appetite, as this effect seems to be produced by the α_{1} subtype of GABA_{A} rather than α_{5}. The inverse agonist Ro15-4513, which blocks the α_{5} subtype of GABA_{A}, reverses the effects of alcohol, suggesting that this subtype is also important in producing the subjective effects of alcohol intoxication.

== See also ==
- GL-II-73
- Pyeazolam
- SH-I-048A
- SH-053-R-CH3-2′F
