= Α3IA =

Chemical compound, anxiogenic

α3IA

Names
- IUPAC name Methyl 5-(4-methoxyphenyl)-1-methyl-2-oxo-6-pyridin-4-ylpyridine-3-carboxylate

Identifiers
3D model (JSmol)	Interactive image
ChEMBL	ChEMBL413325
ChemSpider	9998940
IUPHAR/BPS	4094
PubChem CID	11824289
- InChI: InChI=1S/C20H18N2O4/c1-22-18(14-8-10-21-11-9-14)16(12-17(19(22)23)20(24)26-3)13-4-6-15(25-2)7-5-13/h4-12H,1-3H3 Key: LENMNEQXCQXJHV-UHFFFAOYSA-N
- SMILES: CN1C(=C(C=C(C1=O)C(=O)OC)C2=CC=C(C=C2)OC)C3=CC=NC=C3

Properties
Chemical formula	C_{20}H_{18}N_{2}O_{4}
Molar mass	350.374 g·mol^{−1}
- Except where otherwise noted, data are given for materials in their standard state (at 25 °C [77 °F], 100 kPa). Infobox references

α3IA, also known as GTPL4094, is an inverse agonist of the GABA_{A} receptor. It is more selective for the α3 subunit, hence its name.

== Effects ==
Agonism of the α3 subunit shows anxiolytic properties. However, by being an inverse agonist, α3IA has the opposite action: it shows anxiogenic properties.

This compound also has affinity for the other subunits of the GABA_{A} receptor, but it is more selective for the α3 subunit.

== See also ==
- α5IA, an inverse agonist at the α5 subunit of GABA_{A} receptors
