= NS-11394 =

Chemical compound

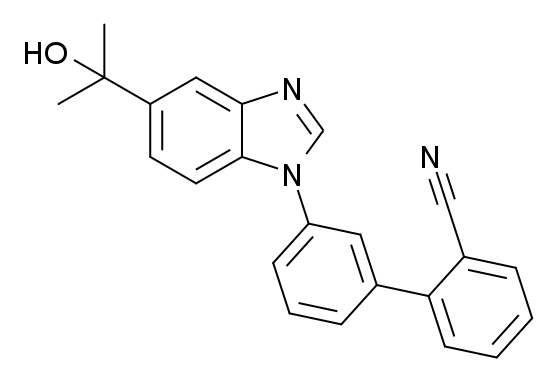

Identifiers
- IUPAC name: 2-(3-[5-(2-hydroxypropan-2-yl)benzimidazol-1-yl]phenyl)benzonitrile
- CAS Number: 951650-22-9
- PubChem CID: 16747643
- ChemSpider: 20578861
- UNII: 1PTH9FK74J
- CompTox Dashboard (EPA): DTXSID60587781

Chemical and physical data
- Formula: C_{23}H_{19}N_{3}O
- Molar mass: 353.425 g·mol^{−1}
- 3D model (JSmol): Interactive image
- SMILES: N#Cc2ccccc2-c(ccc3)cc3-n1cnc(c4)c1ccc4C(C)(C)O
- InChI: InChI=1S/C23H19N3O/c1-23(2,27)18-10-11-22-21(13-18)25-15-26(22)19-8-5-7-16(12-19)20-9-4-3-6-17(20)14-24/h3-13,15,27H,1-2H3; Key:HLKYSQGBIIIQJN-UHFFFAOYSA-N

NS-11394 is a drug which acts as a subtype-selective positive allosteric modulator at GABA_{A} receptors, with selectivity for the α_{3} and α_{5} subtypes. It has been researched as an analgesic for use in chronic or neuropathic pain.
