= Ro4938581 =

Chemical compound

Identifiers
- IUPAC name: 3-Bromo-10-(difluoromethyl)-9H-benzo[f]imidazo[1,5-a][1,2,4]triazolo[1,5-d][1,4]diazepine
- CAS Number: 883093-10-5
- PubChem CID: 11624499
- IUPHAR/BPS: 4299
- ChemSpider: 9799246
- UNII: ZK5NA2M82J
- ChEMBL: ChEMBL1080588
- CompTox Dashboard (EPA): DTXSID601045378

Chemical and physical data
- Formula: C_{13}H_{8}BrF_{2}N_{5}
- Molar mass: 352.143 g·mol^{−1}
- 3D model (JSmol): Interactive image
- SMILES: FC(F)C(N=C1)=C(N1C2=C3C=C(Br)C=C2)CN4C3=NC=N4
- InChI: InChI=1S/C13H8BrF2N5/c14-7-1-2-9-8(3-7)13-17-5-19-21(13)4-10-11(12(15)16)18-6-20(9)10/h1-3,5-6,12H,4H2; Key:AFJRYPJIKHMNGL-UHFFFAOYSA-N

Ro4938581 is a nootropic drug invented in 2009 by a team working for Hoffmann-La Roche, which acts as a subtype-selective inverse agonist at the α_{5} subtype of the benzodiazepine binding site on the GABA_{A} receptor. It has good selectivity for the α_{5} subtype and did not produce convulsant or anxiogenic effects in animal studies, making it a promising potential nootropic. Ro4938581 and a related derivative basmisanil (RG-1662, RO5186582) have subsequently been investigated for the alleviation of cognitive dysfunction in Down syndrome.

== See also ==
- GABA_{A} receptor negative allosteric modulator
- GABA_{A} receptor § Ligands
