= SH-053-R-CH3-2′F =

Benzodiazepine drug

Identifiers
- IUPAC name: (R)-8-ethynyl-6-(2-fluorophenyl)-4-methyl-4H-2,5,10b-triaza-benzo[e]azulene-3-carboxylic acid ethyl ester
- CAS Number: 872874-14-1
- PubChem CID: 11574585
- ChemSpider: 9749355
- CompTox Dashboard (EPA): DTXSID101028420

Chemical and physical data
- Formula: C_{23}H_{18}FN_{3}O_{2}
- Molar mass: 387.414 g·mol^{−1}
- 3D model (JSmol): Interactive image
- SMILES: Fc2ccccc2C1=NC(C)c3c(C(=O)OCC)ncn3-c(cc4)c1cc4C#C
- InChI: InChI=1S/C23H18FN3O2/c1-4-15-10-11-19-17(12-15)20(16-8-6-7-9-18(16)24)26-14(3)22-21(23(28)29-5-2)25-13-27(19)22/h1,6-14H,5H2,2-3H3/t14-/m1/s1; Key:NGYKELBMVXBFSM-CQSZACIVSA-N

SH-053-R-CH3-2′F is a drug used in scientific research which is a benzodiazepine derivative. It produces some of the same effects as other benzodiazepines, but is much more subtype-selective than most other drugs of this class, having high selectivity, binding affinity and efficacy at the α_{5} subtype of the GABA_{A} receptor. This gives much tighter control of the effects produced, and so while SH-053-R-CH3-2′F retains sedative and anxiolytic effects, it does not cause ataxia at moderate doses. SH-053-R-CH3-2′F also blocks the nootropic effects of the α_{5}-selective inverse agonist PWZ-029, so amnesia is also a likely side effect.

Replacement of the ester function by an amide, realized in analogs such as MP-III-022 and GL-II-73, improves selectivity, efficacy, and kinetic behavior.

== See also ==
- Pyeazolam
- QH-ii-066
- SH-I-048A
