= PWZ-029 =

Chemical compound

Identifiers
- IUPAC name: 8-chloro-3-(methoxymethyl)-5-methyl-4H-imidazo[1,5-a][1,4]benzodiazepin-6-one
- CAS Number: 164025-33-6
- PubChem CID: 9971547
- ChemSpider: 8147139
- UNII: 9D3DS54YCD
- ChEMBL: ChEMBL45346
- CompTox Dashboard (EPA): DTXSID801028421

Chemical and physical data
- Formula: C_{14}H_{14}ClN_{3}O_{2}
- Molar mass: 291.74 g·mol^{−1}
- 3D model (JSmol): Interactive image
- SMILES: ClC1=CC=C2C(C(N(CC3=C(COC)N=CN32)C)=O)=C1
- InChI: InChI=1S/C14H14ClN3O2/c1-17-6-13-11(7-20-2)16-8-18(13)12-4-3-9(15)5-10(12)14(17)19/h3-5,8H,6-7H2,1-2H3; Key:FXIDXTIMKAEBGY-UHFFFAOYSA-N

PWZ-029 is a benzodiazepine derivative drug with nootropic effects developed by WiSys, It acts as a subtype-selective, mixed agonist-inverse agonist at the benzodiazepine binding site on the GABA_{A} receptor, acting as a partial inverse agonist at the α_{5} subtype and a weak partial agonist at the α_{3} subtype. This gives it a mixed pharmacological profile, producing at low doses memory-enhancing effects but with no convulsant or anxiogenic effects or muscle weakness, although at higher doses it produces some sedative effects.

== See also ==
- GABA_{A} receptor negative allosteric modulator
- GABA_{A} receptor § Ligands
- GL-II-73
