= Sarmazenil =

Chemical compound

Clinical data
- AHFS/Drugs.com: International Drug Names
- ATCvet code: QV03AB91 (WHO)

Identifiers
- IUPAC name: Ethyl 7-chloro-5-methyl-6-oxo-5,6-dihydro-4H-imidazo[1,5-a][1,4]benzodiazepine-3-carboxylate
- CAS Number: 78771-13-8
- PubChem CID: 71231
- ChemSpider: 64366
- UNII: F84AE7X24P
- ChEMBL: ChEMBL46547
- CompTox Dashboard (EPA): DTXSID70229281

Chemical and physical data
- Formula: C_{15}H_{14}ClN_{3}O_{3}
- Molar mass: 319.75 g·mol^{−1}
- 3D model (JSmol): Interactive image
- SMILES: CCOC(=O)C1=C2CN(C(=O)C3=C(N2C=N1)C=CC=C3Cl)C
- InChI: InChI=1S/C15H14ClN3O3/c1-3-22-15(21)13-11-7-18(2)14(20)12-9(16)5-4-6-10(12)19(11)8-17-13/h4-6,8H,3,7H2,1-2H3; Key:WSDBAFQWNWJTNG-UHFFFAOYSA-N

Sarmazenil (Ro15-3505) is a drug from the benzodiazepine family. It acts as a partial inverse agonist of benzodiazepine receptors, meaning that it causes the opposite effects to most benzodiazepine drugs, and instead acts as an anxiogenic and convulsant. It is used in veterinary medicine to reverse the effects of benzodiazepine sedative drugs in order to rapidly re-awaken anesthetized animals.

== See also ==
- GABA_{A} receptor negative allosteric modulator
- GABA_{A} receptor § Ligands
