= 2002 Wuchuan kindergarten poisoning =

Attempted murder case in Guangdong, China

- Native name: 广东吴川幼儿园特大投毒案
- Location: Kangle No. 2 Kindergarten; Wuchuan, Guangdong, China
- Date: 25 November 2002
- Weapon: Rat poison (tetramethylenedisulfotetramine)
- Deaths: 0
- Injuries: 72
- Perpetrator: Huang Hu
- Motive: Ruining a rival business
- Convictions: Release of hazardous substances

The Wuchuan kindergarten poisoning was a case of intentional mass poisoning that took place at Kangle No. 2 Kindergarten in Wuchuan, Guangdong, China, on 25 November 2002. Seventy-two people, including seventy children, were hospitalized after consuming food laced with TETS. All recovered within two weeks of the incident.

The perpetrator, Huang Hu, had acted out of resentment against the Kangle kindergarten's owner, blaming him for the failure of his own recently opened kindergarten. He was sentenced to death in December 2002 and executed in January 2003.

== Background ==
Kangle No. 2 Kindergarten (Chinese: 康乐第二幼儿园) was located in Da'an Village, part of Huangpo Town. The kindergarten was privately operated in cooperation with the established public Kangle Kindergarten, the name meaning "Happy Health".

Huang Hu (simplified Chinese: 黄湖; traditional Chinese: 黃湖; pinyin: Huáng Hú) was a 29-year-old physician who had opened his own kindergarten, (新世纪幼儿园; 'New Century Kindergarten'), on 4 October 2002. However, as Kangle No. 2 Kindergarten was well-regarded, Huang's business received no clients who wanted to switch over. In an attempt to attract customers, Huang acquired a car for shuttle service, but Kangle No. 2 Kindergarten subsequently purchased a better, more expensive van in response.

== Crime ==
In early November, Huang bought a single packet of dushuqiang rat poison and on 22 November, he made his plans to contaminate Kangle No. 2 Kindergarten's food supply to ruin their business. On the night of 24 November, at about 23:00, after an unrelated argument with his wife, Huang broke into the kindergarten's kitchen and mixed the rat poison powder with the salt supply.

On the morning of 25 November, kindergarten staff used the contaminated salt to make rice porridge for breakfast. At about 9:00 a.m., two teachers complained of dizziness and vomiting before losing consciousness, leading both to be taken to Chuanxi Hospital. By 11:30 a.m., seventy students of the kindergarten experienced the same symptoms and also brought to the hospital, which assumed a case of food poisoning.

Wuchuan Municipial Party Secretary Pan Tai, who was in Huangpo to inspect family planning developments, was informed of the incident and after visiting the victims at the hospital, he ordered for all 72 patients to be brought to the larger Wuchuan City People's Hospital and Nanyou Hospital. At the order of Wuchuan Mayor Gao Yongyuan, in agreement with Huangpo's government and town committee, redirected medical staff from 21 regional hospitals to treat the victims. Huangpo police collected samples of the vomit for analysis at Zhanjiang City Epidemic Prevention Station and on 26 November, lab results confirmed the presence of TETS in the samples. By 8 December, all affected had recovered from the poisoning.

Huang Hu was arrested in the early hours of 29 November and confessed to the act in custody. His trial took place on 17 December 2002, during which his defense argued that the poisoning was committed solely to eliminate his competition rather than with the intention of killing anyone. He was convicted of endangering public security through the release of hazardous substance and sentenced to death. He launched an unsuccessful appeal repeating his previous trial defense. Sixteen days later, Huang was executed.

== See also ==
- List of school attacks in China
