= Radequinil =

Chemical compound

Clinical data
- ATC code: None

Identifiers
- IUPAC name: 5-(3-methoxyphenyl)-3-(5-methyl-1,2,4-oxadiazol-3-yl)-1,6-naphthyridin-2(1H)-one
- CAS Number: 219846-31-8
- PubChem CID: 22714308
- ChemSpider: 11584471
- UNII: 2G222T03EY
- CompTox Dashboard (EPA): DTXSID60944577

Chemical and physical data
- Formula: C_{18}H_{14}N_{4}O_{3}
- Molar mass: 334.335 g·mol^{−1}
- 3D model (JSmol): Interactive image
- SMILES: COc1cccc(c1)c3nccc2NC(=O)\C(=C/c23)c4nc(C)on4
- InChI: InChI=1S/C18H14N4O3/c1-10-20-17(22-25-10)14-9-13-15(21-18(14)23)6-7-19-16(13)11-4-3-5-12(8-11)24-2/h3-9H,1-2H3,(H,21,23); Key:JQOFKKWHXGQABB-UHFFFAOYSA-N

Radequinil (INN; AC-3933) is a cognitive enhancer which acts as a partial inverse agonist of the benzodiazepine site of the GABA_{A} receptor. It was under development by Dainippon Sumitomo Pharma for the treatment of Alzheimer's disease and made it to phase II clinical trials but development seems to have been halted and it was never marketed.

== See also ==
- GABA_{A} receptor negative allosteric modulator
- GABA_{A} receptor § Ligands
