= Pyeazolam =

Triazolobenzodiazepine drug

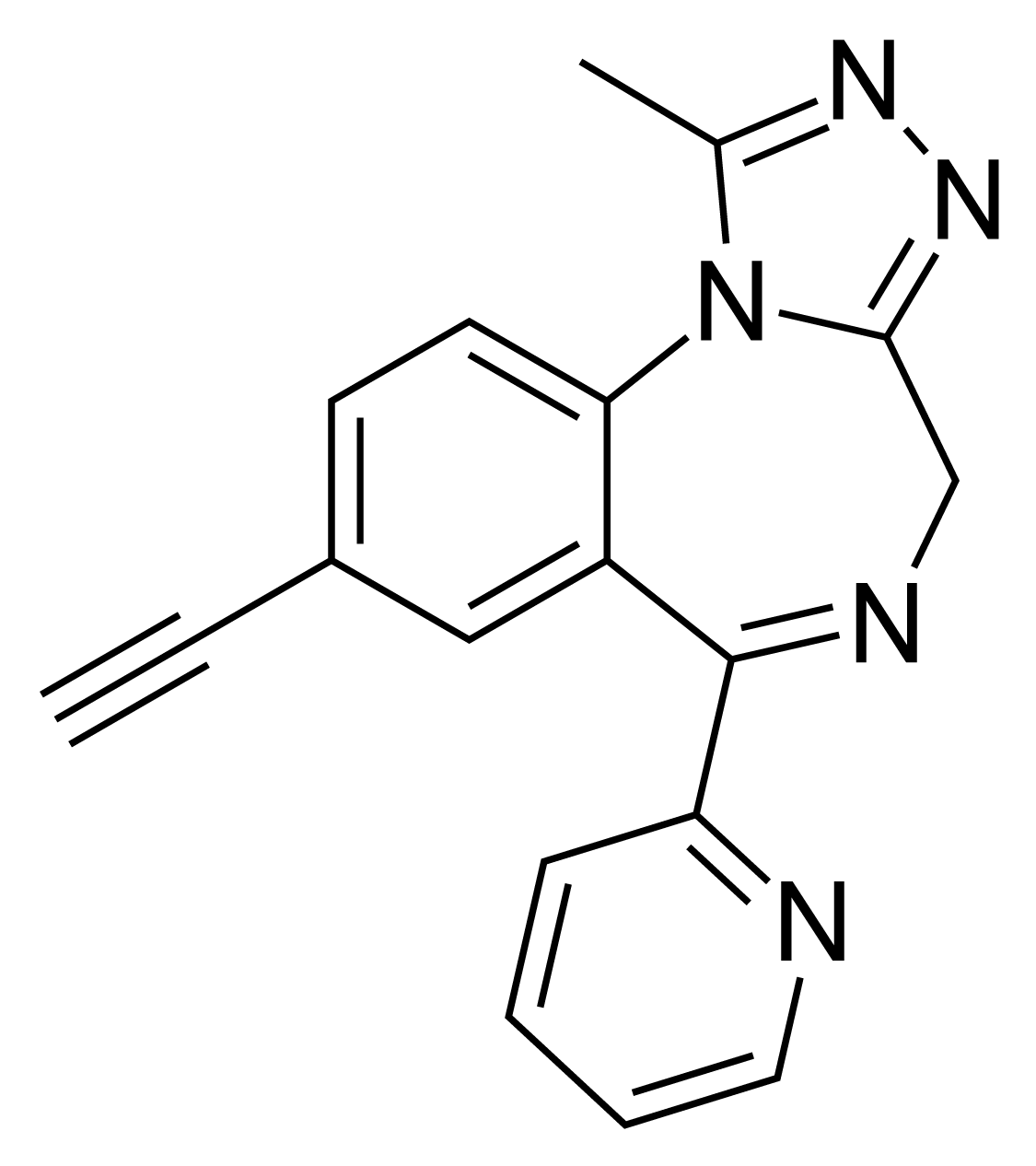

Identifiers
- IUPAC name: 8-ethynyl-1-methyl-6-(pyridin-2-yl)-4H-benzo[f][1,2,4]triazolo[4,3-a][1,4]diazepine
- CAS Number: 1349115-59-8
- PubChem CID: 71811108
- ChemSpider: 30768095

Chemical and physical data
- Formula: C_{18}H_{13}N_{5}
- Molar mass: 299.337 g·mol^{−1}
- 3D model (JSmol): Interactive image
- SMILES: CC1=NN=C2N1C3=C(C=C(C=C3)C#C)C(=NC2)C4=CC=CC=N4
- InChI: InChI=1S/C18H13N5/c1-3-13-7-8-16-14(10-13)18(15-6-4-5-9-19-15)20-11-17-22-21-12(2)23(16)17/h1,4-10H,11H2,2H3; Key:LQKOTGTWBANJBS-UHFFFAOYSA-N

Pyeazolam (SH-TRI-108) is a triazolobenzodiazepine derivative which has been sold online as a designer drug. It has been found to be relatively selective for the α_{5} subtype of GABA_{A} receptors, in a similar manner to the related compound QH-ii-066, and is claimed to have an effects profile more similar to alcohol than typical benzodiazepines.

Several possible routes for synthesis have been determined.

== See also ==
- GL-II-73
- Pyrazolam
- Pynazolam
- SH-053-R-CH3-2'F
- List of benzodiazepines
