= DSTA =

DSTA may refer to:

- Defence Science and Technology Agency, a statutory board under the purview of the Ministry of Defence, Singapore
- Defence Services Technological Academy, the premier technological university of the Myanmar Armed Forces
- Tetramethylenedisulfotetramine, a chemical compound
