= PNV-001 =

Clinical data
- Other names: PNV001; Deuterated basmisanil; Deubasmisanil
- Drug class: GABA_{A} receptor negative allosteric modulator
- ATC code: None

PNV-001, also known as deuterated basmisanil, is a highly selective α_{5} subunit-containing GABA_{A} receptor negative allosteric modulator which is under investigation for the treatment of treatment-resistant depression and suicidal ideation. It is a deuterated analogue of basmisanil with improved pharmacokinetics and metabolic stability. The drug's half-life is 5.5-fold longer than that of basmisanil in human liver microsomes in vitro. It produces rapid and persistent antidepressant-like effects in animals. PNV-001 and related drugs are said to lack the undesirable central effects of hallucinogens like ketamine and serotonergic psychedelics and of non-subunit-selective GABA_{A} receptor negative allosteric modulators like flumazenil. It is being developed by ProNovo Therapeutics. As of September 2023, it is in the preclinical research stage of development.

== See also ==
- GABA_{A} receptor negative allosteric modulator
- List of investigational antidepressants
- L-655,708 and MRK-016
