= Terbequinil =

Chemical compound

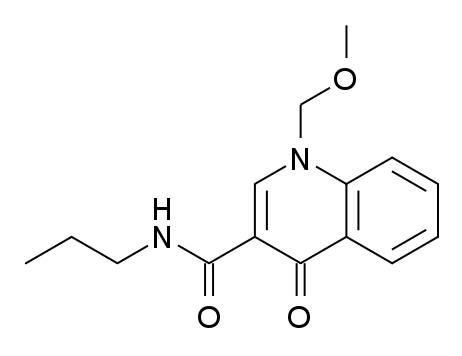

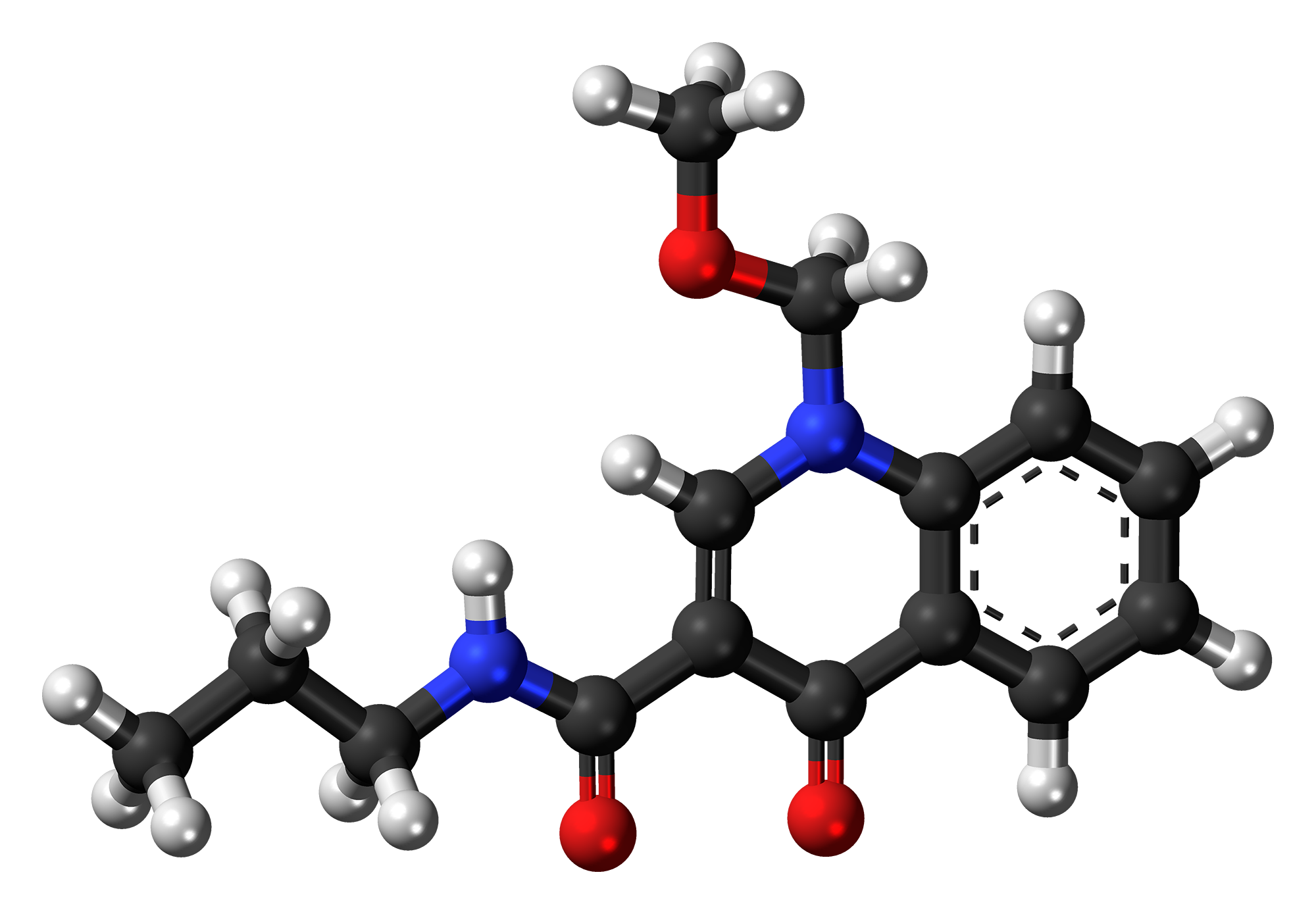

Clinical data
- ATC code: none

Identifiers
- IUPAC name: 1-(methoxymethyl)-4-oxo-N-propylquinoline-3-carboxamide
- CAS Number: 113079-82-6
- PubChem CID: 65916
- ChemSpider: 59325
- UNII: 0DH9WUS03O
- CompTox Dashboard (EPA): DTXSID50150281

Chemical and physical data
- Formula: C_{15}H_{18}N_{2}O_{3}
- Molar mass: 274.320 g·mol^{−1}
- 3D model (JSmol): Interactive image
- SMILES: CCCNC(=O)C1=CN(C2=CC=CC=C2C1=O)COC
- InChI: InChI=1S/C15H18N2O3/c1-3-8-16-15(19)12-9-17(10-20-2)13-7-5-4-6-11(13)14(12)18/h4-7,9H,3,8,10H2,1-2H3,(H,16,19); Key:RIPDGZHPNKQLDC-UHFFFAOYSA-N

Terbequinil (SR-25776) is a stimulant and nootropic drug which acts as a partial inverse agonist at benzodiazepine sites on the GABA_{A} receptor. In human trials it was found to partially reverse the sedative and amnestic effects of the hypnotic drug triazolam with only slight effects when administered by itself.

== See also ==
- GABA_{A} receptor negative allosteric modulator
- List of investigational cognition and memory disorder drugs
