= TB-21007 =

Chemical compound

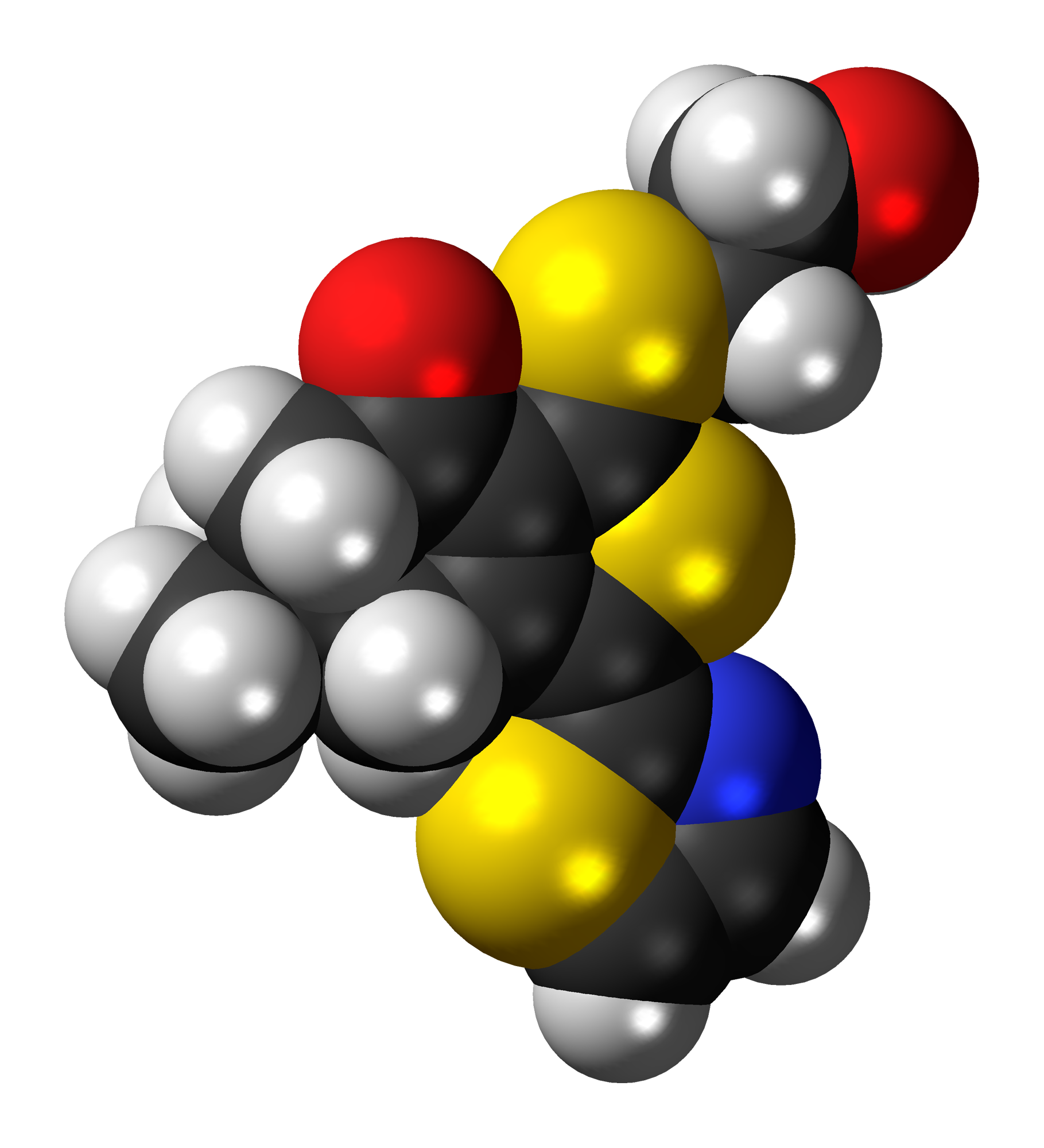

Identifiers
- IUPAC name: 6,6-dimethyl-3-(2-hydroxyethyl)thio-1-(thiazol-2-yl)-6,7-dihydro-2-benzothiophen-4(5H)-one
- CAS Number: 207306-50-1
- PubChem CID: 6918633
- ChemSpider: 5293826
- UNII: VL2NQQ83RN
- ChEMBL: ChEMBL17603
- CompTox Dashboard (EPA): DTXSID40426083

Chemical and physical data
- Formula: C_{15}H_{17}NO_{2}S_{3}
- Molar mass: 339.49 g·mol^{−1}
- 3D model (JSmol): Interactive image
- SMILES: s3ccnc3-c2sc(SCCO)c1c2CC(C)(C)CC1=O
- InChI: InChI=1S/C15H17NO2S3/c1-15(2)7-9-11(10(18)8-15)14(20-6-4-17)21-12(9)13-16-3-5-19-13/h3,5,17H,4,6-8H2,1-2H3; Key:QILRYFCEXLFIDS-UHFFFAOYSA-N

TB-21007 is a nootropic drug which acts as a subtype-selective inverse agonist at the α_{5} containing GABA_{A} receptors.

== See also ==
- GABA_{A} receptor negative allosteric modulator
- GABA_{A} receptor § Ligands
