= ZK-93423 =

Chemical compound

Clinical data
- ATC code: none

Legal status
- Legal status: In general: legal

Identifiers
- IUPAC name: ethyl 4-(methoxymethyl)-6-(phenylmethoxy) -9H-pyrido[5,4-b]indole-3-carboxylate
- CAS Number: 83910-44-5
- PubChem CID: 121926
- IUPHAR/BPS: 4346
- ChemSpider: 108771
- UNII: B6PWX5B47Q
- ChEBI: CHEBI:92593
- ChEMBL: ChEMBL1518572
- CompTox Dashboard (EPA): DTXSID101004052

Chemical and physical data
- Formula: C_{23}H_{22}N_{2}O_{4}
- Molar mass: 390.439 g·mol^{−1}
- 3D model (JSmol): Interactive image
- SMILES: c3ccccc3COc(cc4)cc2c4[nH]c(cnc1C(=O)OCC)c2c1COC
- InChI: InChI=1S/C23H22N2O4/c1-3-28-23(26)22-18(14-27-2)21-17-11-16(29-13-15-7-5-4-6-8-15)9-10-19(17)25-20(21)12-24-22/h4-12,25H,3,13-14H2,1-2H3; Key:ALBKMJDFBZVHAK-UHFFFAOYSA-N

ZK-93423 is an anxiolytic drug from the β-carboline family, closely related to abecarnil. It is a nonbenzodiazepine GABA_{A} agonist which is not subtype selective and stimulates α_{1}, α_{2}, α_{3}, and α_{5}-subunit containing GABA_{A} receptors equally. It has anticonvulsant, muscle relaxant and appetite stimulating properties comparable to benzodiazepine drugs. ZK-93423 has also been used as a base to develop new and improved beta-carboline derivatives and help map the binding site of the GABA_{A} receptor.

== See also ==
- Substituted β-carboline
- ZK-93426
