= Functional agonist =

Functional agonist may refer to:

- functional selectivity
- Physiological agonism
