= SH-I-048A =

Benzodiazepine drug

Legal status
- Legal status: CA: Schedule IV; DE: NpSG (Industrial and scientific use only); UK: Under Psychoactive Substances Act

Identifiers
- IUPAC name: (3S)-7-bromo-5-(2-fluorophenyl)-3-methyl-1H-benzo[e][1,4]diazepin-2(3H)-one
- CAS Number: 872874-11-8
- PubChem CID: 49850464
- ChemSpider: 57381614
- UNII: KN27P6CSU9

Chemical and physical data
- Formula: C_{16}H_{12}BrFN_{2}O
- Molar mass: 347.187 g·mol^{−1}
- 3D model (JSmol): Interactive image
- SMILES: Fc3ccccc3C2=N[C@@H](C)C(=O)Nc1ccc(Br)cc12
- InChI: InChI=1S/C16H12BrFN2O/c1-9-16(21)20-14-7-6-10(17)8-12(14)15(19-9)11-4-2-3-5-13(11)18/h2-9H,1H3,(H,20,21)/t9-/m0/s1; Key:QEFZCKUXGLDPPT-VIFPVBQESA-N

SH-I-048A (SH-i-048A) is a benzodiazepine derivative related in structure to compounds such as flubromazepam and meclonazepam. SH-I-048A is described as a non subtype selective superagonist at the benzodiazepine site of GABA_{A} receptors, with a binding affinity of 0.77 nM at the α_{1} subtype, 0.17 nM at α_{2}, 0.38 nM at α_{3} and 0.11 nM at α_{5}. It has been used to study the functional differences between the different subtypes of the GABA_{A} receptor.

== See also ==
- GL-II-73
- QH-II-66
- SH-053-R-CH3-2'F
