= Iomazenil =

Chemical compound

Clinical data
- Other names: Ro 16-0154

Identifiers
- IUPAC name: ethyl 7-iodanyl-5-methyl-6-oxo-4H-imidazo[1,5-a][1,4]benzodiazepine-3-carboxylate
- CAS Number: 127985-21-1 127396-36-5 (^{123}I)
- PubChem CID: 65959
- ChemSpider: 59362
- UNII: 7DVX185FLQ; ^{123}I: B851121553
- ChEMBL: ChEMBL2105020
- CompTox Dashboard (EPA): DTXSID00155549

Chemical and physical data
- Formula: C_{15}H_{14}^{123}IN_{3}O_{3}
- Molar mass: 407.290 g/mol
- 3D model (JSmol): Interactive image
- SMILES: CCOC(=O)c1c2n(cn1)-c3cccc(c3C(=O)N(C2)C)I
- InChI: InChI=1S/C15H14IN3O3/c1-3-22-15(21)13-11-7-18(2)14(20)12-9(16)5-4-6-10(12)19(11)8-17-13/h4-6,8H,3,7H2,1-2H3/i16-4; Key:FRIZVHMAECRUBR-KIWWSDKQSA-N

Iomazenil (also known as Ro16-0154, INN, USAN; benzodine) is an antagonist and partial inverse agonist of benzodiazepine and a potential treatment for alcohol use disorder. The compound was introduced in 1989 by pharmaceutical company Hoffmann-La Roche as an Iodine-123-labelled SPECT tracer for imaging benzodiazepine receptors (GABA_{A} receptors) in the brain. Iomazenil is an analogue of flumazenil (Ro15-1788).

== Use in brain research ==
^{123}I-labelled iomazenil can be used to image epileptic seizure foci as an alternative to ^{18}F-fludeoxyglucose PET imaging.

The effect of iomazenil of reducing levels of GABA in the brain was used by researchers to exacerbate symptoms in patients with schizophrenia in a laboratory study, supporting the theory that a GABA deficiency underlies that disease.

== Alcohol treatment ==
Researchers at Yale University and Veterans Affairs Connecticut Healthcare System have been testing iomazenil as a potential treatment for drunkenness due to its ability to bind alcohol receptors in the brain.

== See also ==
- GABA_{A} receptor negative allosteric modulator
- GABA_{A} receptor § Ligands
