= C18H20N2O3 =

The molecular formula C_{18}H_{20}N_{2}O_{3} (molar mass: 312.36 g/mol) may refer to:

- 25CN-NBOH
- ZK-93426 (ethyl-5-isopropoxy-4-methyl-beta-carboline-3-carboxylate)
