= Superagonist =

High-efficacy agonist drug

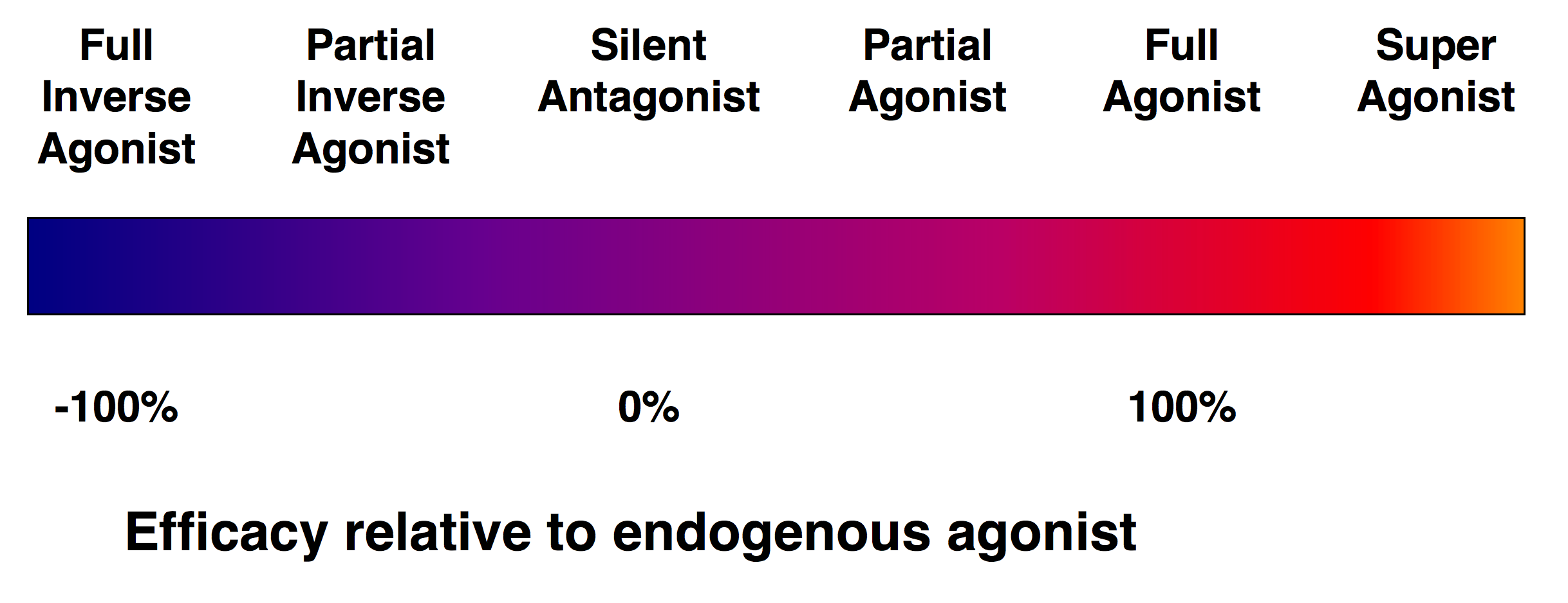
Efficacy spectrum of receptor ligands.

In the field of pharmacology, a superagonist is a type of agonist that is capable of producing a maximal response greater than the endogenous agonist for the target receptor, and thus has an efficacy of more than 100%. For example, goserelin is a superagonist of the gonadotropin-releasing hormone receptor and muscimol of the GABAA receptor.

== See also ==
- Agonist
