= Depressogen =

Substance that causes depression

A depressogen is a substance that causes or can cause depression, usually as a side effect. They are the functional opposites of antidepressants.

Examples of drugs commonly associated with depressogenic effects include ethanol, some anticonvulsants such as the barbiturates (e.g. phenobarbital), benzodiazepines (e.g. diazepam), vigabatrin, and topiramate, corticosteroids like dexamethasone and prednisone, cytokines like interferon-α and interleukin-2, certain antihypertensives such as amiodarone, clonidine, methyldopa, reserpine, and tetrabenazine (used as an antipsychotic/antihyperkinetic), and agents with antiandrogen, antiestrogen, and/or anti-neurosteroid activities such as GnRH agonists (e.g., leuprorelin, goserelin), anastrozole (an aromatase inhibitor), finasteride (a 5α-reductase inhibitor), and clomifene (a SERM), as well as others including flunarizine, mefloquine, and efavirenz. Another notable agent is rimonabant, a cannabinoid receptor antagonist marketed as an anti-obesity agent which was withdrawn shortly after its introduction due to the incidence of severe psychiatric side effects associated with its use including depression, anxiety, and suicidal ideation.

Examples of endogenous compounds that have been implicated in stress and depression include corticotropin-releasing hormone (CRH), cytokines (e.g., interferon-α, interleukin-2), tachykinins (e.g., substance P), glucocorticoids (e.g., cortisol, cortisone), and dynorphin.

== See also ==
- Anxiogenic
- Euphoriant
