= Ro15-4513 =

Chemical compound

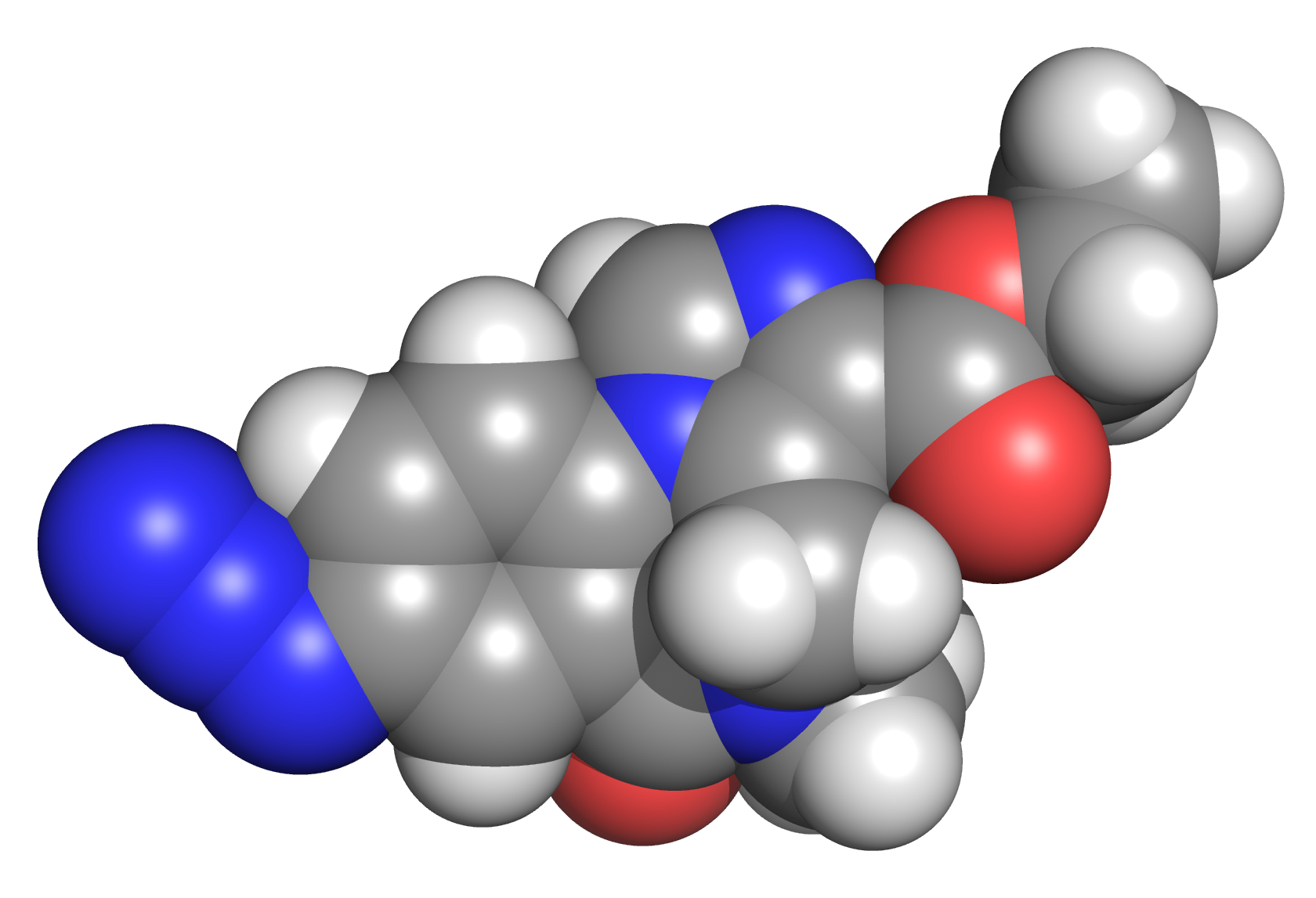

Clinical data
- Drug class: GABA_{A} receptor inverse agonist
- ATC code: None

Identifiers
- IUPAC name: Ethyl-8-azido-5,6-dihydro-5-methyl-6-oxo-4H-imidazo-1,4-benzodiazepine-3-carboxylate
- CAS Number: 91917-65-6
- PubChem CID: 5081
- IUPHAR/BPS: 4296
- ChemSpider: 4903
- UNII: S5XGL82O5Y
- ChEMBL: ChEMBL6597
- CompTox Dashboard (EPA): DTXSID80238763

Chemical and physical data
- Formula: C_{15}H_{14}N_{6}O_{3}
- Molar mass: 326.316 g·mol^{−1}
- 3D model (JSmol): Interactive image
- SMILES: O=C(OCC)C1=C2CN(C)C(C3=CC(N=[N+]=[N-])=CC=C3N2C=N1)=O
- InChI: InChI=1S/C15H14N6O3/c1-3-24-15(23)13-12-7-20(2)14(22)10-6-9(18-19-16)4-5-11(10)21(12)8-17-13/h4-6,8H,3,7H2,1-2H3; Key:CFSOJZTUTOQNIA-UHFFFAOYSA-N

Ro15-4513 is a weak partial inverse agonist of the benzodiazepine class of drugs, developed by Hoffmann–La Roche in the 1980s. It acts as an inverse agonist (which acts in a similar way as a competitive antagonist). The drug has been explored as possible antidote to the sedative and cognitively impairing effects of ethanol.

Ro15-4513 is structurally related to the benzodiazepine antidote flumazenil.

== Uses ==
=== Photoaffinity label ===
Ro 15‑4513, is an azide derivative of Ro 15‑1788 (flumazenil) and was first prepared as a photoaffinity label of benzodiazepine receptors.

=== Alcohol antidote ===
It was later discovered that Ro15-4513 was as an antidote to alcohol (ethanol). Flumazenil effectively blocks the effects of benzodiazepine agonists such as alprazolam and diazepam, and so is used for treating overdoses of these drugs, but does not reverse the central nervous system depressant effects of ethanol. Ro15-4513 was somewhat less effective than flumazenil at blocking the effects of benzodiazepines, but was able to effectively block the effects of ethanol. This contrasted with flumazenil, which does not antagonize the central nervous system effects of ethanol, and led to interest in Ro15-4513 as a potential alcohol antidote. It is thought that Ro15-4513 antagonizes the effects of ethanol because the azido group at the 8-position of the benzene ring blocks an ethanol-sensitive binding site on the α5β3δ subtype of the GABA_{A} receptor. Flumazenil, which has a fluorine substituent at this position, does not block this site and therefore does not counteract the effects of ethanol.

Unfortunately Ro15-4513 had several disadvantages that made it unsuitable for development and marketing. Its fairly short half-life means that several repeated doses would have to be given over an extended period, since if only one dose were used it would wear off before the alcohol had been metabolised and the patient would relapse (similar to the problems with renarcotization seen when treating overdoses of long-acting opioids such as methadone with short-acting antagonists such as naloxone). Also, because it antagonizes GABA receptors, Ro15-4513 causes serious side effects including both anxiety and, at higher doses, seizures, which would require careful control of dosing and would cause complications in clinical use. Another problem is that alcohol's effects are not purely mediated by GABA receptors; at higher doses, alcohol binds to several other targets as well, so while Ro15-4513 is an effective antidote against moderate levels of alcohol intoxication, it might be ineffective at treating life-threatening overdoses.

There were concerns about the legal and clinical implications of introducing an alcohol antidote that blocks the effect of ethanol without accelerating its clearance from the bloodstream. The temporary nature of the antagonistic effect meant that intoxication could re-emerge once the drug wore off, as the underlying alcohol remained present.

The discovery of Ro15-4513 contributed to a clearer understanding of the mechanisms by which ethanol exerts its effects in the central nervous system. Insights gained from studies of this compound have informed subsequent research into the development of ethanol antagonists and other modulators of GABA_{A} receptor function, including efforts to design agents with longer duration of action or altered side-effect profiles.

=== Current use in PET Imaging ===
Labelling Ro15-4513 with carbon-11 leads to the possibility of its use in PET imaging of the brain. The specificity of the compound to a small number of GABA receptor sub-types leads to the generation, with accurate modelling, of detailed images with well-defined limbic and cortical structures. These images can be useful in quantitatively analysing conditions such as addiction, that are known to be, at least in part, associated with the GABAergic system. The images produced are similar to those for labelled flumazenil, though the distribution varies especially in regions such as the occipital lobe, cerebellum, and basal ganglia, as it does not selectively label the GABRA1 subtype.

== See also ==
- GABA_{A} receptor negative allosteric modulator
- GABA_{A} receptor § Ligands
- Alcoholism
