= Adipiplon =

Chemical compound

Clinical data
- Routes of administration: Oral
- ATC code: none

Legal status
- Legal status: In general: uncontrolled

Identifiers
- IUPAC name: 7-[(2-(3-Fluoropyridin-2-yl)-1H-imidazol-1-yl)methyl]-2-methyl-8-propyl-[1,2,4]triazolo[1,5-c]pyrimidine
- CAS Number: 840486-93-3
- ChemSpider: 9373993
- UNII: OPL214POJ1
- KEGG: D08840
- ChEMBL: ChEMBL2103791
- CompTox Dashboard (EPA): DTXSID40232944

Chemical and physical data
- Formula: C_{18}H_{18}FN_{7}
- Molar mass: 351.389 g·mol^{−1}
- 3D model (JSmol): Interactive image
- SMILES: n4c(C)nc1n4cnc(c1CCC)Cn2ccnc2-c3ncccc3F
- InChI: InChI=1S/C18H18FN7/c1-3-5-13-15(22-11-26-17(13)23-12(2)24-26)10-25-9-8-21-18(25)16-14(19)6-4-7-20-16/h4,6-9,11H,3,5,10H2,1-2H3; Key:UAMAIHOEGLEXSV-UHFFFAOYSA-N

Adipiplon (developmental code name NG2-73) is an anxiolytic drug developed by Neurogen Corporation. It has similar effects to benzodiazepine drugs, but is structurally distinct and classed as a nonbenzodiazepine anxiolytic.

Adipiplon is a subtype-selective GABA_{A} receptor partial agonist, which binds preferentially to the α_{3} subtype. This is significant as while several previous nonbenzodiazepine drugs have been developed that are selective for α_{2/3} over the other subtypes, adipiplon is one of the first drugs selected for clinical development which can discriminate between α_{2} and α_{3}, as well as showing a little affinity for the α_{1} or α_{5} subtypes — alpidem is selective for α_{3} over α_{2}, but still has moderate affinity for α_{1}, whereas adipiplon is highly α_{3}-selective with little affinity for either α_{1}, α_{2} or α_{5}.

Adipiplon was being researched as a potential medication for the treatment of anxiety and insomnia, and in 2008 it was being used in Phase IIb trials. These trials were suspended after significant next-day side effects were discovered.

== See also ==
- List of investigational antipsychotics
- List of investigational hypnotics
- Alpidem
