= Anxiotropic =

Drug which affects feelings of anxiety

An anxiotropic (/ˌæŋksiəˈtɹoʊpɪk/) agent is one that modifies the emotion, anxiety, which is associated with excessive worry and fear, an elevated heart rate, and feelings of irritability, restlessness, and panic. Anxiety is also a highly prevalent psychiatric condition that affects a significant portion of the population and can often have debilitating effects. Many animals also exhibit features of anxiety, specifically when presented novel or predatory stimuli. These similarities make animal models a useful tool in understanding anxiety in humans, specifically animals that are genetically similar to humans, such as rodents and zebrafish (Danio reriro).

In psychopharmacology, anxiotropic agents consist of two categories of psychoactive drugs: anxiolytics that reduce anxiety and may be used therapeutically, and anxiogenic compounds that increase anxiety.

== Pharmacology ==
=== Anxiolytics ===
Anxiolytics reduce anxiety by targeting specific neurotransmitter sites and modulating the production and utilization of these neurotransmitters in the brain. GABA (γ-aminobutyric acid) is the brain's primary inhibitory neurotransmitter, and clinical evidence has shown that excessive down-regulation of GABA receptor sites is correlated with symptoms of anxiety. Serotonin (5-HT) is another neurotransmitter that, when targeted by appropriate medications, can reduce anxiety. However, there is conflicting evidence about whether increased serotonin production reduces anxiety. Researchers have identified both anxiolytic and anxiogenic effects of serotonin depending on the receptor site and the neural pathway being activated. Noradrenaline is another neurotransmitter that has been linked to symptoms of anxiety, specifically in panic disorders and post-traumatic stress disorder (PTSD).

Common anxiolytic medications include benzodiazepines, selective serotonin reuptake inhibitors (SSRIs), and anticonvulsants. Benzodiazepines, such as alprazolam (Xanax), clonazepam (Klonopin), and diazepam (Valium), target GABA neurotransmitters to increase inhibition, and are some of the most commonly used anxiolytics. SSRIs, such as fluoxetine (Prozac), sertraline (Zoloft), and escitalopram (Lexapro), work by selectively blocking serotonin from being taken back into the cell, thus stimulating the production of more serotonin in the brain.

==== Anxiogenics ====
Anxiogenic substances increase feelings of anxiety, and they are often modulated by chemical, genetic, and situational factors. Amphetamines, nicotine, caffeine, and cocaine are all compounds that produce anxiogenic effects through the disruption of neurotransmitter production. Increased anxiety has been associated with the production of corticotropin-releasing hormone (CRH), the suppression of GABA, adenosine antagonists, and at times serotonin. As stated previously, increased serotonin can have both anxiolytic and anxiogenic effects, and researchers have identified two different neural pathways along with different receptor types that produce these results: the medial raphe nucleus (MRN), which is responsible for fear modulation, and the dorsal raphe nucleus (DRN), which is responsible for modulate anxious cognitions.

== Clinical importance ==
Anxiotropic agents are commonly used in the treatment of a variety of mental conditions, such as anxiety, insomnia, and panic disorder. Anxiolytics can be prescribed on a daily basis or to be taken as needed. Globally, the two most widely used psychoactive drugs are anxiotropic agents: ethanol, an anxiolytic, and caffeine, an anxiogenic. While intake of both ethanol and caffeine has been shown to exert an anxiolytic effect, their withdrawal is associated with anxiogenic effects.

Because so many substances are associated with both anxiolytic and anxiogenic effects, it is essential for researchers to discern the situational factors and neural mechanisms that underlie anxiety so that it can be treated more efficiently.

== See also ==
- Anxiety
- Benzodiazepines
