= Endogenous agonist =

In pharmacology, an endogenous agonist for a particular receptor is a compound naturally produced by the body which binds to and activates that receptor. For example, the primary endogenous agonist for serotonin receptors is serotonin, and the primary endogenous agonist for dopamine receptors is dopamine.

In general, receptors for small molecule neurotransmitters such as serotonin will have only one endogenous agonist, but often have many different receptor subtypes (e.g. 13 different receptors for serotonin). On the other hand, neuropeptide receptors tend to have fewer subtypes, but may have several different endogenous agonists. This allows for a high degree of complexity in the body's signalling system, with different tissues often showing quite distinct responses to a particular ligand. Some endogenous antagonists and inverse agonists are also known (e.g., kynurenic acid at the NMDA receptor), but these are much less common.
