= Basmisanil =

Chemical compound

Clinical data
- Other names: RG-1662; RO5186582
- ATC code: None

Identifiers
- IUPAC name: (1,1-Dioxo-1,4-thiazinan-4-yl)-[6-[[3-(4-fluorophenyl)-5-methyl-1,2-oxazol-4-yl]methoxy]pyridin-3-yl]methanone
- CAS Number: 1159600-41-5
- PubChem CID: 57336276
- ChemSpider: 34500832
- UNII: 788PET5SUA
- KEGG: D10863
- CompTox Dashboard (EPA): DTXSID201032402

Chemical and physical data
- Formula: C_{21}H_{20}FN_{3}O_{5}S
- Molar mass: 445.47 g·mol^{−1}
- 3D model (JSmol): Interactive image
- SMILES: CC1=C(C(=NO1)C2=CC=C(C=C2)F)COC3=NC=C(C=C3)C(=O)N4CCS(=O)(=O)CC4
- InChI: InChI=1S/C21H20FN3O5S/c1-14-18(20(24-30-14)15-2-5-17(22)6-3-15)13-29-19-7-4-16(12-23-19)21(26)25-8-10-31(27,28)11-9-25/h2-7,12H,8-11,13H2,1H3; Key:VCGRFBXVSFAGGA-UHFFFAOYSA-N

Basmisanil (INN; developmental codes RG-1662 and RO5186582) is a highly selective inverse agonist/negative allosteric modulator of α_{5} subunit-containing GABA_{A} receptors which is under development by Roche for the treatment of cognitive impairment associated with Down syndrome. As of June 2016, it is no longer studied for this purpose. It underwent a clinical trial for cognitive impairment in patients with schizophrenia.

== See also ==
- List of investigational antipsychotics
- GABA_{A} receptor negative allosteric modulator
- GABA_{A} receptor § Ligands
- PNV-001
