= Α5IA =

Chemical compound

α_{5}IA

Clinical data
- Other names: LS-193,268
- ATC code: None

Pharmacokinetic data
- Elimination half-life: 2-2.5h

Identifiers
- IUPAC name: 3-(5-methylisoxazol-3-yl)-6-[(1-methyl-1H-1,2,3-triazol-4-yl)methoxy][1,2,4]triazolo[3,4-a]phthalazine
- CAS Number: 215874-86-5
- PubChem CID: 6918451
- ChemSpider: 5293648
- UNII: 1M7NI1A92L
- CompTox Dashboard (EPA): DTXSID10175950

Chemical and physical data
- Formula: C_{17}H_{14}N_{8}O_{2}
- Molar mass: 362.353 g·mol^{−1}
- 3D model (JSmol): Interactive image
- SMILES: CC1=CC(=NO1)C2=NN=C3N2N=C(C4=CC=CC=C43)OCC5=CN(N=N5)C
- InChI: InChI=1S/C17H14N8O2/c1-10-7-14(22-27-10)16-20-19-15-12-5-3-4-6-13(12)17(21-25(15)16)26-9-11-8-24(2)23-18-11/h3-8H,9H2,1-2H3; Key:NZMJFRXKGUCYNP-UHFFFAOYSA-N

α_{5}IA (LS-193,268) is a nootropic drug invented in 2004 by a team working for Merck, Sharp and Dohme, which acts as a subtype-selective inverse agonist at the benzodiazepine binding site on the GABA_{A} receptor. It binds to α_{1}, α_{2}, α_{3} and α_{5} -containing subtypes, with functional selectivity for α_{5}-containing subtypes.

== Clinical research ==
Administration of α_{5}IA following alcohol consumption was found to reverse memory impairments induced by alcohol.

== In vitro electrophysiology ==
Recordings of local field potentials indicate that oral administration of α5IA increases the amplitude of sharp wave ripples which are implicated in memory function in adult wild type rats. The increase in ripple amplitude is not seen in adult male TgF344-AD rats which express human β-amyloid precursor protein (with the Swedish mutation) and human presenilin-1 (with a Δ exon 9 mutation).

== See also ==
- GABA_{A} receptor negative allosteric modulator
- GABA_{A} receptor § Ligands
