= FG-7142 =

Names
- Preferred IUPAC name N-Methyl-5H-pyrido[3,4-b]indole-2-carboxamide
- Other names ZK-31906

Identifiers
CAS Number	78538-74-6
3D model (JSmol)	Interactive image
ChemSpider	4222
MeSH	C526324
PubChem CID	4375
UNII	60PO70N1BP
CompTox Dashboard (EPA)	DTXSID30999832
- InChI: InChI=1S/C13H11N3O/c1-14-13(17)11-6-9-8-4-2-3-5-10(8)16-12(9)7-15-11/h2-7,16H,1H3,(H,14,17) Key: QMCOPDWHWYSJSA-UHFFFAOYSA-N
- SMILES: CNC(=O)C1=NC=C2C(=C1)C3=CC=CC=C3N2

Properties
Chemical formula	C_{13}H_{11}N_{3}O
Molar mass	225.24594
- Except where otherwise noted, data are given for materials in their standard state (at 25 °C [77 °F], 100 kPa). verify (what is ?) Infobox references

FG-7142 (ZK-31906) is a drug of the β-carboline family which acts as a partial inverse agonist at the benzodiazepine allosteric site of the GABA_{A} receptor. It has anorectic, anxiogenic and pro-convulsant effects. It also increases release of acetylcholine and noradrenaline, and improves memory retention in animal studies.

== See also ==
- Substituted β-carboline
