= GL-II-73 =

Benzodiazepine drug

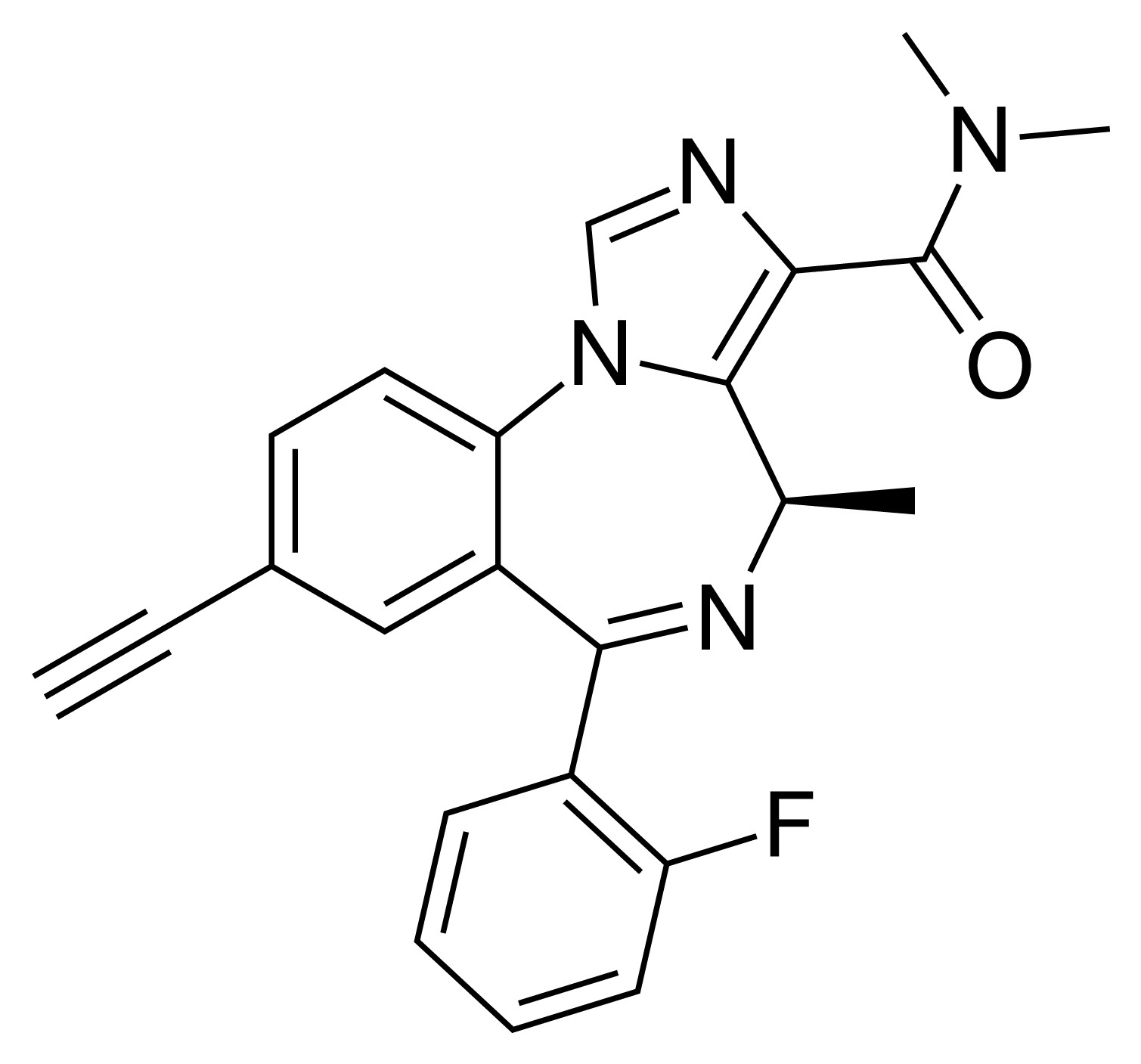

Identifiers
- IUPAC name: (4R)-8-ethynyl-6-(2-fluorophenyl)-N,N,4-trimethyl-4H-benzo[f]imidazo[1,5-a] [1,4]diazepine-3-carboxamide
- CAS Number: 2133456-81-0
- PubChem CID: 130439778
- ChemSpider: 128443307
- ChEMBL: ChEMBL4537552

Chemical and physical data
- Formula: C_{23}H_{19}FN_{4}O
- Molar mass: 386.430 g·mol^{−1}
- 3D model (JSmol): Interactive image
- SMILES: CN(C)C(=O)c4ncn2c4[C@@H](C)N=C(c1cc(C#C)ccc12)c3ccccc3F
- InChI: InChI=1S/C23H19FN4O/c1-5-15-10-11-19-17(12-15)20(16-8-6-7-9-18(16)24)26-14(2)22-21(23(29)27(3)4)25-13-28(19)22/h1,6-14H,2-4H3/t14-/m1/s1; Key:LNPOWXXHIUMIKI-CQSZACIVSA-N

GL-II-73 (GL-ii-073) is a benzodiazepine derivative related in chemical structure to compounds such as midazolam and adinazolam. It is described as an α_{5} preferring positive allosteric modulator of the benzodiazepine site of GABA_{A} receptors, with weaker activity at α_{2} and α_{3} and no significant affinity for the α_{1} subtype. In animal tests it was found to produce effects consistent with antidepressant, anxiolytic and nootropic actions. It is now being researched as a potential treatment agent for Alzheimer's disease.

== See also ==
- Imidazenil
- Pyeazolam
- QH-II-66
- SH-I-048A
- SH-053-R-CH3-2'F
- Ro4938581
