= Intrinsic activity =

Measure of relative response to a drug

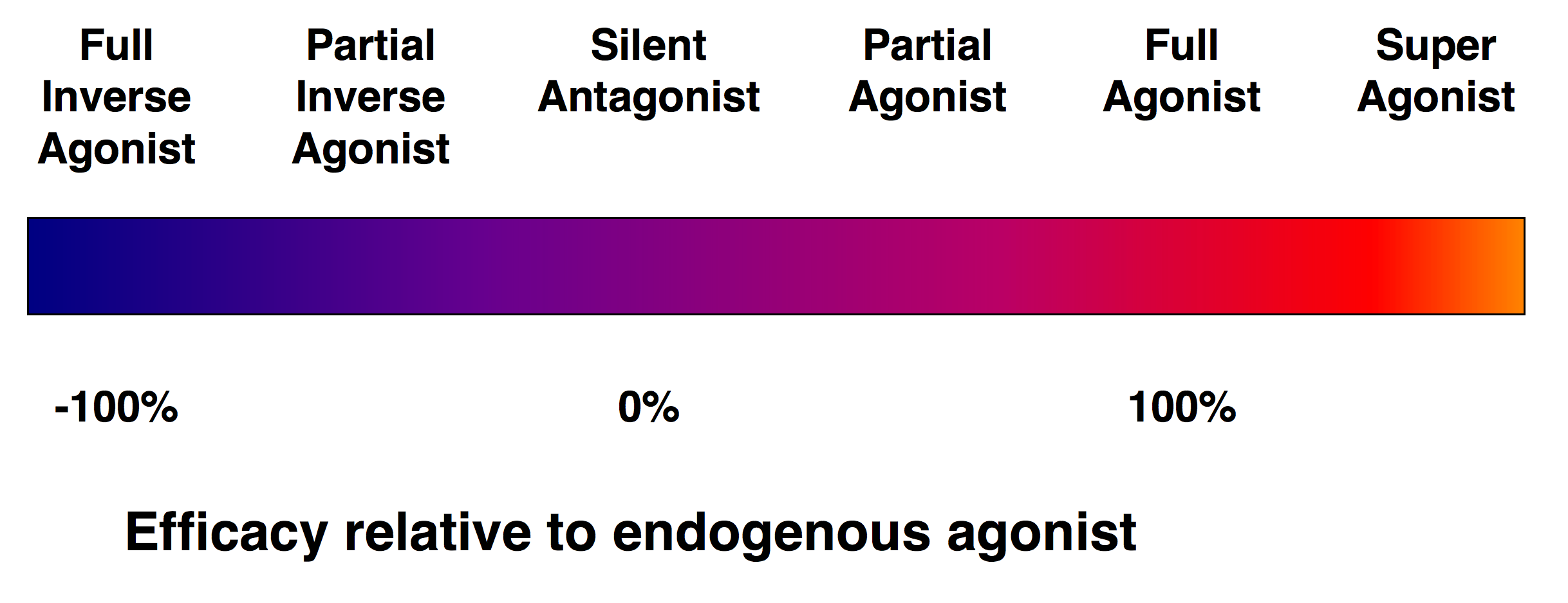
Efficacy spectrum of receptor ligands.

Intrinsic activity (IA) and maximal efficacy (E_{max}) refer to the relative ability of a drug-receptor complex to produce a maximum functional response. This must be distinguished from the affinity, which is a measure of the ability of the drug to bind to its molecular target, and the EC_{50}, which is a measure of the potency of the drug and which is proportional to both efficacy and affinity. This use of the word "efficacy" was introduced by Stephenson (1956) to describe the way in which agonists vary in the response they produce, even when they occupy the same number of receptors. High efficacy agonists can produce the maximal response of the receptor system while occupying a relatively low proportion of the receptors in that system. There is a distinction between efficacy and intrinsic activity.

== Mechanism of efficacy ==
| Ligand | Description | % Efficacy (E) | | | | |
|---|---|---|---|---|---|---|
| Superagonist | Efficacy higher than the endogenous agonist | E | > | 100 | | |
| Full agonist | Efficacy equal to the endogenous agonist | E | = | 100 | | |
| Partial agonist | Efficacy less than the endogenous agonist | 0 | < | E | < | 100 |
| Silent antagonist | Affinity but no efficacy | E | = | 0 | | |
| Inverse agonist | Inverse efficacy | E | < | 0 | | |

Agonists of lower efficacy are not as efficient at producing a response from the drug-bound receptor, by stabilizing the active form of the drug-bound receptor. Therefore, they may not be able to produce the same maximal response, even when they occupy the entire receptor population, as the efficiency of transformation of the inactive form of the drug-receptor complex to the active drug-receptor complex may not be high enough to evoke a maximal response. Since the observed response may be less than maximal in systems with no spare receptor reserve, some low efficacy agonists are referred to as partial agonists. However, it is worth bearing in mind that these terms are relative - even partial agonists may appear as full agonists in a different system/experimental setup, as when the number of receptors increases, there may be enough drug-receptor complexes for a maximum response to be produced, even with individually low efficacy of transducing the response. There are actually relatively few true full agonists or silent antagonists; many compounds usually considered to be full agonists (such as DOI) are more accurately described as high efficacy partial agonists, as a partial agonist with efficacy over ≈80-90% is indistinguishable from a full agonist in most assays. Similarly many antagonists (such as naloxone) are in fact partial agonists or inverse agonists, but with very low efficacy (less than 10%). Compounds considered partial agonists tend to have efficacy in between this range. Another case is represented by silent agonists, which are ligands that can place a receptor, typically an ion channel, into a desensitized state with little or no apparent activation of it, forming a complex that can subsequently generate currents when treated with an allosteric modulator.

== Intrinsic activity ==
Intrinsic activity of a test agonist is defined as:

$\mathrm{IA}=\frac{\text{maximal response to the test agonist}}{\text{maximal response to full agonist}}$

== Stevenson's efficacy ==
R. P. Stephenson (1925–2004) was a British pharmacologist. Efficacy has historically been treated as a proportionality constant between the binding of the drug and the generation of the biological response. Stephenson defined efficacy as:

$S=ep$

where $p$ is the proportion of agonist-bound receptors (given by the Hill equation) and $S$ is the stimulus to the biological system. The response is generated by an unknown function $f(S)$, which is assumed to be hyperbolic. This model was arguably flawed in that it did not incorporate the equilibrium between the inactivated agonist-bound-receptor and the activated agonist-bound-receptor that is shown in the del Castillo Katz model.

== Furchgott's efficacy ==
Robert F. Furchgott later improved on Stephenson's model with the definition of efficacy, e, as

$S=\underbrace{\varepsilon[\ce{R}]_{\mathrm{Tot}}}_{e}\cdot p$

where $\varepsilon$ is the intrinsic efficacy and $[\ce{R}]_{\mathrm{Tot}}$ is the total concentration of receptors.

Stevenson and Furchgott's models of efficacy have been criticised and many more have been developed. The models of efficacy are shown in Bindslev (2008).
