= DMCM =

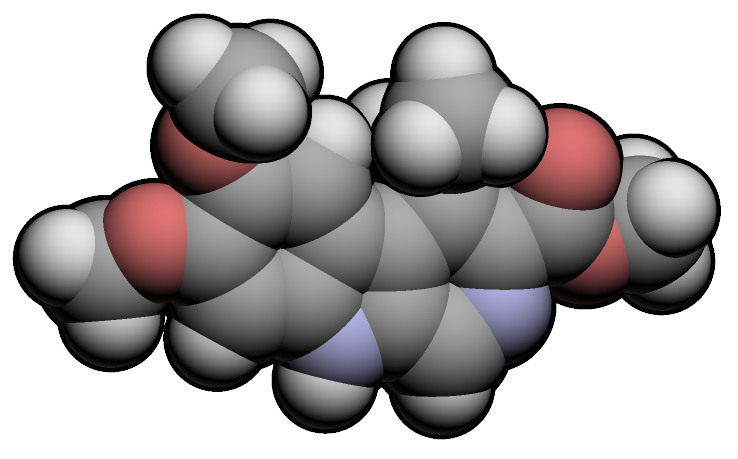

Names
- Preferred IUPAC name Methyl 4-ethyl-6,7-dimethoxy-9H-pyrido[3,4-b]indole-3-carboxylate
- Other names DMCM

Identifiers
CAS Number	82499-00-1
3D model (JSmol)	Interactive image
ChemSpider	94746
ECHA InfoCard	100.220.168
IUPHAR/BPS	4179
PubChem CID	104999
UNII	1309288N1J
CompTox Dashboard (EPA)	DTXSID90896999
- InChI: InChI=1S/C17H18N2O4/c1-5-9-15-10-6-13(21-2)14(22-3)7-11(10)19-12(15)8-18-16(9)17(20)23-4/h6-8,19H,5H2,1-4H3 Key: GADIKQPUNWAMEB-UHFFFAOYSA-N
- SMILES: CCC1=C2C3=CC(=C(C=C3NC2=CN=C1C(=O)OC)OC)OC

Properties
Chemical formula	C_{17}H_{18}N_{2}O_{4}
Molar mass	314.336 g/mol
Boiling point	87 °C (189 °F; 360 K)
- Except where otherwise noted, data are given for materials in their standard state (at 25 °C [77 °F], 100 kPa). verify (what is ?) Infobox references

DMCM (methyl 6,7-dimethoxy-4-ethyl-β-carboline-3-carboxylate) is a drug from the β-carboline family that induces anxiety and convulsions by acting as a negative allosteric modulator of GABA_{A} receptors — functionally opposite to benzodiazepines and related drugs which are positive allosteric modulators — and is used in scientific research for these properties to test new anxiolytic and anticonvulsant medications, respectively. It has also been shown to produce analgesic effects in animals, which is thought to be the drug's induced panic reducing the perception of pain.

== See also ==
- Substituted β-carboline
- GABA_{A} receptor negative allosteric modulator
- GABA_{A} receptor § Ligands
