= ZK-93426 =

Names
- Preferred IUPAC name Ethyl 4-methyl-5-[(propan-2-yl)oxy]-9H-pyrido[3,4-b]indole-3-carboxylate
- Other names ZK-93426; Ethyl 5-isopropoxy-4-methyl-9H-β-carboline-3-carboxylate

Identifiers
CAS Number	89592-45-0
3D model (JSmol)	Interactive image
ChEMBL	ChEMBL1271047
ChemSpider	103086
IUPHAR/BPS	4347
PubChem CID	115210
UNII	S8EEB2VSB3
CompTox Dashboard (EPA)	DTXSID401008889
- InChI: InChI=1S/C18H20N2O3/c1-5-22-18(21)17-11(4)15-13(9-19-17)20-12-7-6-8-14(16(12)15)23-10(2)3/h6-10,20H,5H2,1-4H3 Key: VMDUABMKBUKKPG-UHFFFAOYSA-N; InChI=1/C18H20N2O3/c1-5-22-18(21)17-11(4)15-13(9-19-17)20-12-7-6-8-14(16(12)15)23-10(2)3/h6-10,20H,5H2,1-4H3 Key: VMDUABMKBUKKPG-UHFFFAOYAG
- SMILES: CCOC(=O)C1=NC=C2C(=C1C)C3=C(N2)C=CC=C3OC(C)C

Properties
Chemical formula	C_{18}H_{20}N_{2}O_{3}
Molar mass	312.369 g·mol^{−1}
- Except where otherwise noted, data are given for materials in their standard state (at 25 °C [77 °F], 100 kPa). verify (what is ?) Infobox references

ZK-93426 (ethyl-5-isopropoxy-4-methyl-β-carboline-3-carboxylate) is a drug from the β-carboline family. It acts as a weak partial inverse agonist of benzodiazepine receptors, meaning that it causes the opposite effects to the benzodiazepine class of drugs and has anxiogenic properties, although unlike most benzodiazepine antagonists it is not a convulsant and actually has weak anticonvulsant effects. In human tests it produced alertness, restlessness and feelings of apprehension, and reversed the effect of the benzodiazepine lormetazepam. It was also shown to produce nootropic effects and increased release of acetylcholine.

== See also ==
- Substituted β-carboline
- ZK-93423
