= MRK-016 =

Names
- Preferred IUPAC name 3-tert-Butyl-7-(5-methyl-1,2-oxazol-3-yl)-2-[(1H-1,2,4-triazol-5-yl)methoxy]pyrazolo[1,5-d][1,2,4]triazine

Identifiers
CAS Number	342652-67-9
3D model (JSmol)	Interactive image
ChemSpider	5293780
PubChem CID	6918583
UNII	TXZ4DVJ9MF
CompTox Dashboard (EPA)	DTXSID60426080
- InChI: InChI=1S/C17H20N8O2/c1-10-6-11(23-27-10)15-21-19-7-12-14(17(2,3)4)16(22-25(12)15)26-8-13-18-9-20-24(13)5/h6-7,9H,8H2,1-5H3 Key: QYSYOGCIDRANAR-UHFFFAOYSA-N
- SMILES: CN1N=CN=C1COC1=NN2C(C=NN=C2C2=NOC(C)=C2)=C1C(C)(C)C

Properties
Chemical formula	C_{17}H_{20}N_{8}O_{2}
Molar mass	368.401 g·mol^{−1}
- Except where otherwise noted, data are given for materials in their standard state (at 25 °C [77 °F], 100 kPa). Infobox references

MRK-016 is a selective α_{5} subunit-containing GABA_{A} negative allosteric modulator, that has nootropic properties. It has been found to produce rapid, ketamine-like antidepressant effects in animal models of depression.

== See also ==
- GABA_{A} receptor negative allosteric modulator
- GABA_{A} receptor § Ligands
- L-655,708 and PNV-001
