= Physiological agonism and antagonism =

Behaviour of substances

Physiological agonism describes the action of a substance which ultimately produces the same effects in the body as another substance—as if they were both agonists at the same receptor—without actually binding to the same receptor. Physiological antagonism describes the behavior of a substance that produces effects counteracting those of another substance (a result similar to that produced by an antagonist blocking the action of an agonist at the same receptor) using a mechanism that does not involve binding to the same receptor.

== Examples ==
=== Physiological agonists ===
- Epinephrine induces platelet aggregation, and so does hepatocyte growth factor (HGF). Thus, they are physiological agonists to each other.

=== Physiological antagonists ===
- There are several substances that have antihistaminergic action despite not being ligands for the histamine receptor. For instance, epinephrine raises arterial pressure through vasoconstriction mediated by A1-adrenergic receptor activation, in contrast to histamine, which lowers arterial pressure. Thus, despite not being true antihistamines because they do not bind to and block the histamine receptor, epinephrine and other such substances are physiological antagonists to histamine.
