= Tetramethylenedisulfotetramine =

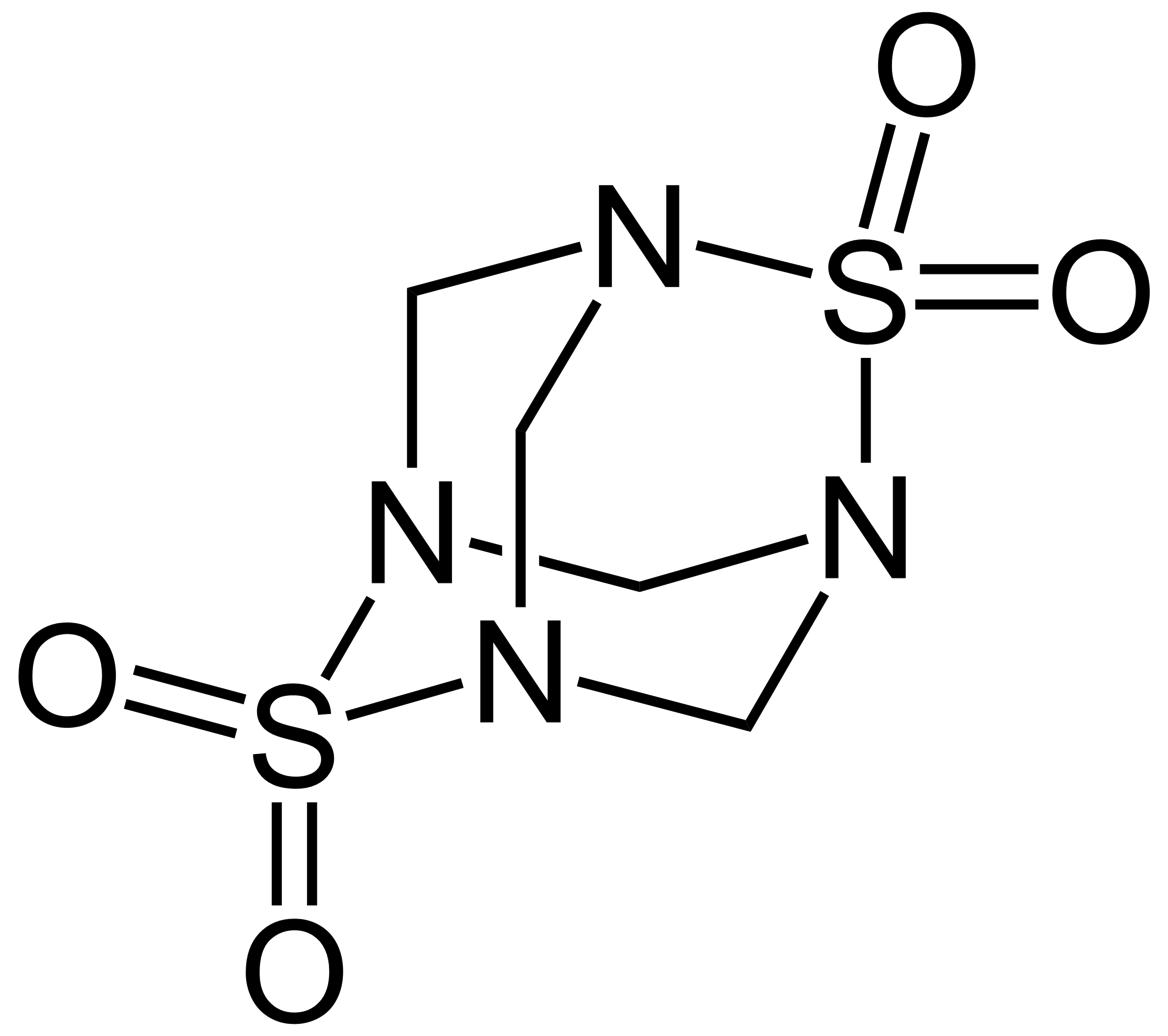

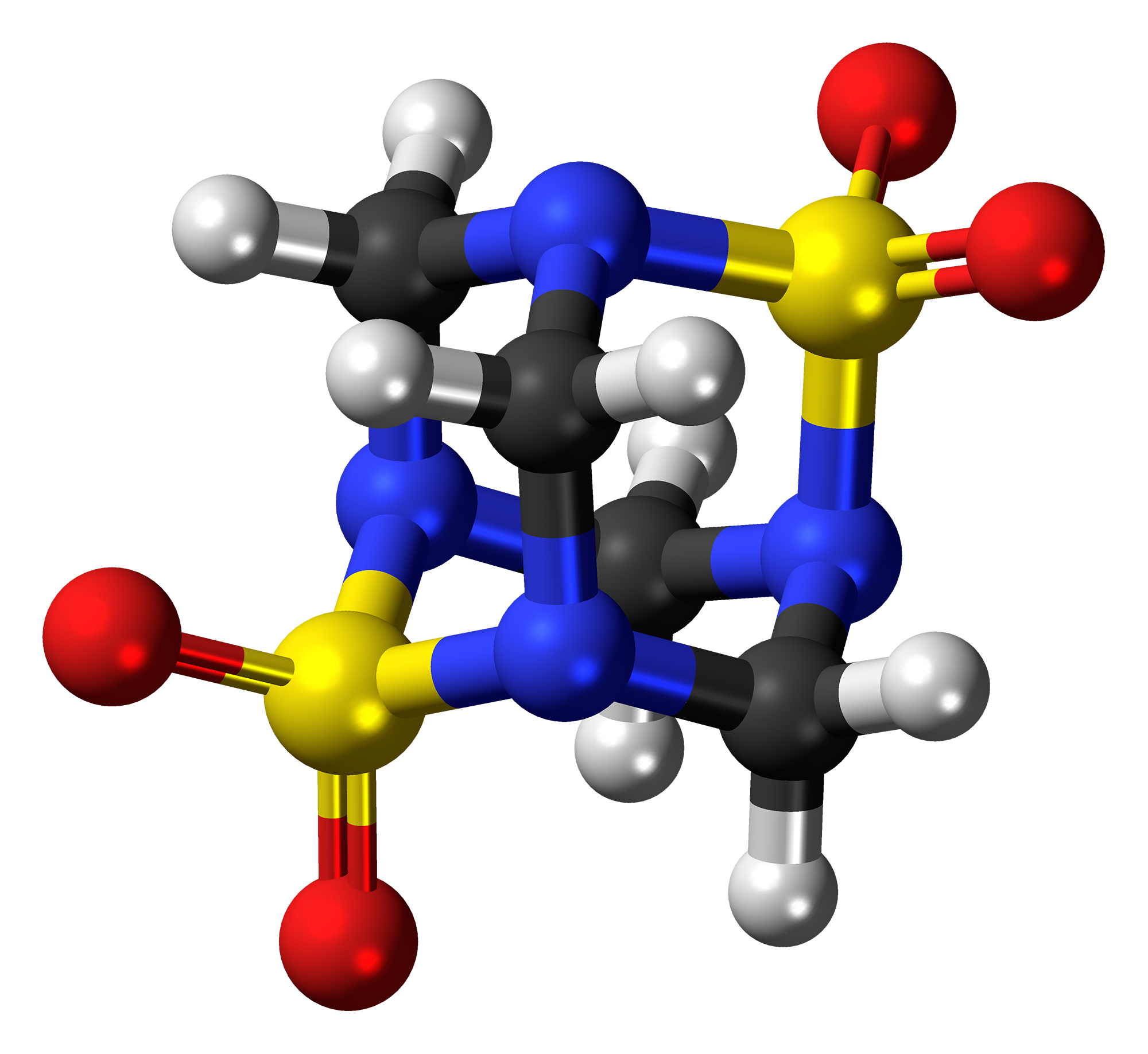

Names
- Preferred IUPAC name 2λ^{6},6λ^{6}-Dithia-1,3,5,7-tetraazaadamantane-2,2,6,6-tetrone
- Other names Tetramethylenedisulphotetramine, Tetramine, TETS, DSTA, Dushuqiang, Four-two-four, 424, NSC 172824, Meishuming, Sanbudao

Identifiers
CAS Number	80-12-6
3D model (JSmol)	Interactive image
Abbreviations	TETS, DSTA
ChemSpider	57722
ECHA InfoCard	100.231.255
PubChem CID	64148
UNII	F6TS3WME05
CompTox Dashboard (EPA)	DTXSID8040307
- InChI: InChI=1S/C4H8N4O4S2/c9-13(10)5-1-6-3-8(13)4-7(2-5)14(6,11)12/h1-4H2 Key: AGGKEGLBGGJEBZ-UHFFFAOYSA-N; InChI=1/C4H8N4O4S2/c9-13(10)5-1-6-3-8(13)4-7(2-5)14(6,11)12/h1-4H2 Key: AGGKEGLBGGJEBZ-UHFFFAOYAA
- SMILES: O=S1(=O)N2CN3CN1CN(C2)S3(=O)=O

Properties
Chemical formula	C_{4}H_{8}N_{4}O_{4}S_{2}
Molar mass	240.26 g/mol
Appearance	White powder
Melting point	255 to 260 °C (491 to 500 °F; 528 to 533 K)
Solubility in water	0.25 mg/mL

Hazards
- Occupational safety and health (OHS/OSH)
Main hazards	extremely toxic
- GHS labelling
Pictograms	(GHS06: Toxic)
- Lethal dose or concentration (LD, LC)
LD_{50} (median dose)	0.90 mg/kg (mice)
- Except where otherwise noted, data are given for materials in their standard state (at 25 °C [77 °F], 100 kPa). verify (what is ?) Infobox references

Tetramethylenedisulfotetramine (TETS) is an organic compound used as a rodenticide (rat poison). It is an odorless, tasteless white powder that is slightly soluble in water, DMSO and acetone, and insoluble in methanol and ethanol. It is a sulfamide derivative. It can be synthesized by reacting sulfamide with formaldehyde solution in acidified water. When crystallized from acetone, it forms cubic crystals with a melting point of 255–260 °C.

== Toxicity and mechanism ==
TETS is a neurotoxin and convulsant, causing lethal convulsions. Its effect is similar to but stronger than picrotoxin, a GABA-A receptor antagonist widely used in research. As one of the most hazardous pesticides, it is 100 times more toxic than potassium cyanide. TETS binds to neuronal GABA gated chloride channels, often causing status epilepticus. No antidote is known. The lethal dose for humans is 7–10 mg. Poisoning is diagnosed by GC-MS and the treatment is mainly supportive, with large IV doses of a benzodiazepine (e.g clonazepam) and pyridoxine to control symptoms. TETS is sequestered in tissues of poisoned birds and can thus pose severe risk of secondary poisoning.

== History ==
Previous research has documented the effectiveness of tetramethylenedisulfotetramine against mice. The dangers of this chemical were first suspected in 1949. The U.S. Forest Service, looking to protect tree seeds for reforestation, noted its lethal effect against the rodent populations. Rather than repel wandering scavengers, the chemical was proved to be toxic to the local rodent population for up to 4 years. Continued experiments conducted by the U.S. Forest Service found no direct effect between TETS and the gastro-intestinal or renal systems of spinal dogs. In this same study, no effects were seen within the peripheral or skeletal nerve system, limiting symptoms of toxicity to the brain stem. Curtis and Johnson were the first to hypothesize TETS antagonistic behavior on GABA. An in-vitro study using superior cervical ganglion neurons of rats found TETS to antagonize the depolarization actions of GABA, while having no influence on the cholinomimetic agent carbachol. This evidence suggests that TETS may act as a non-competitive inhibitor for GABA. Further research findings using crustacean models, indicated a dose-dependent, non-competitive response to TETS that is reversible.

== Research ==
=== In vitro and rapid screening tools ===
Recent studies have indicated the usefulness of pH sensitivity in identifying Chloride ion influx, resulting from GABA-A receptor excitation. Other potential screening tools include spontaneous Calcium ion oscillations seen in hippocampal cell cultures from new born mice. This phenomenon can be measured by Calcium ion sensitive fluorescent dye. Further analyses showed that these Calcium ion oscillations are sensitive to MK-801 (an NMDA open channel blocker), suggesting that NMDA receptor operated channels are involved in TMDT induced spontaneous activity. When considering GABAA receptor activity, diazepam and pregnanolone reversed TMDT activity when applied to cell cultures individually and in combination. MK-801 and ketamine show more antagonistic effects on TMDT than diazepam within cerebral cortical cell cultures of embryonic rats.

=== In vivo mouse models ===
Low dosages of ketamine and MK-801, administered separately, were associated with increased clonic seizures with no effect on tonic clonic seizures on mice exposed to TETS. Further analysis on the same sample of mice, found that dual administration of diazepine and MK-801 had a synergistic protective effect against tonic-clonic seizures and 24-hour lethality, as opposed to clonic seizures that were poorly controlled. Sequential administration diazepine and MK-801 for clonic control of seizures in TETS exposed mice, may indicate the benefits of benzodiazepine-NMDA receptor antagonist regimens used to treat TETS exposed patients.

Sodium dimercaptopropane sulfonate (Na-DMPS) with Vitamin B6 is highly effective in mice. Na-DMPS was identified as a potential antidote due to misdiagnosis of a TETS-poisoned patient in 1998, leading to them being treated with Na-DMPS and unexpected improvement.

== Worldwide restriction ==
Its use worldwide has been banned since 1984, but due to continuing demand and its ease of production, it is still readily, although illegally, available in China, until being formally banned in 2002. The best known Chinese rodenticide, containing about 6–20% TETS, is Dushuqiang, 毒鼠强 "poison rat strong". It has been used for mass poisonings in China: in April 2004, there were 74 casualties after eating scallion-flavored pancakes tainted by their vendor's competitor; and in September 2002, 400 people were poisoned and 38 died from contaminated food. In 2002, there was one documented case of accidental poisoning in the US.

== See also ==
- GABA_{A} receptor negative allosteric modulator
- GABA_{A} receptor § Ligands
- Strychnine
- Picrotoxin
