= GABRA3 =

Protein-coding gene in humans

Identifiers
- Aliases: GABRA3, gamma-aminobutyric acid type A receptor alpha3 subunit, gamma-aminobutyric acid type A receptor subunit alpha3
- External IDs: OMIM: 305660; MGI: 95615; GeneCards: GABRA3

Gene location (Human)
Chr.	X chromosome (human)
Band	Xq28	Start	152,166,234 bp
Band	Xq28	End	152,451,315 bp

Gene location (Mouse)
Chr.	X chromosome (mouse)
Band	X A7.3|X 37.24 cM	Start	71,476,287 bp
Band	X A7.3|X 37.24 cM	End	71,700,454 bp
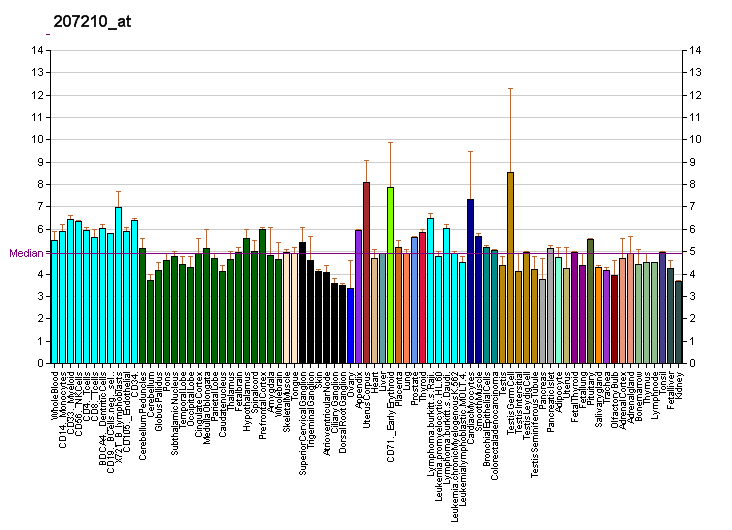
RNA expression pattern
Bgee	Human / Mouse (ortholog); Top expressed in: prefrontal cortex; cingulate gyrus; testicle; anterior cingulate cortex; Brodmann area 9; right frontal lobe; ventricular zone; ganglionic eminence; hypothalamus; amygdala / Top expressed in: anterior amygdaloid area; lateral hypothalamus; dorsomedial hypothalamic nucleus; ventromedial nucleus; superior frontal gyrus; subiculum; lateral septal nucleus; medial dorsal nucleus; paraventricular nucleus of hypothalamus; lumbar subsegment of spinal cord; More reference expression data
BioGPS	More reference expression data
Gene ontology
Molecular function	GABA-A receptor activity; ion channel activity; protein binding; benzodiazepine receptor activity; chloride channel activity; extracellular ligand-gated ion channel activity; transmembrane signaling receptor activity; inhibitory extracellular ligand-gated ion channel activity; GABA-gated chloride ion channel activity; transmitter-gated ion channel activity involved in regulation of postsynaptic membrane potential
Cellular component	integral component of membrane; GABA-A receptor complex; postsynaptic membrane; membrane; plasma membrane; synapse; integral component of plasma membrane; chloride channel complex; cell junction; GABA-ergic synapse; integral component of postsynaptic specialization membrane; dendrite membrane; neuron projection; postsynapse
Biological process	gamma-aminobutyric acid signaling pathway; chloride transmembrane transport; ion transport; chloride transport; ion transmembrane transport; signal transduction; chemical synaptic transmission; regulation of membrane potential; nervous system process; synaptic transmission, GABAergic; regulation of postsynaptic membrane potential
Sources:Amigo / QuickGO
Orthologs
Databases	NCBI: entry; OMA: entry
Species	Human	Mouse
Entrez	2556	14396
Ensembl	ENSG00000011677	ENSMUSG00000031343
UniProt	P34903	P26049
RefSeq (mRNA)	NM_000808	NM_008067; NM_001357814; NM_001357815; NM_001357816; NM_001358103
RefSeq (protein)	NP_000799	NP_032093; NP_001344743; NP_001344744; NP_001344745; NP_001345032
Location (UCSC)	Chr X: 152.17 – 152.45 Mb	Chr X: 71.48 – 71.7 Mb
PubMed search
- Wikidata
View/Edit Human	View/Edit Mouse

Gamma-aminobutyric acid receptor subunit alpha-3 is a protein that in humans is encoded by the GABRA3 gene.

== Function ==
GABA is the major inhibitory neurotransmitter in the mammalian brain where it acts at GABA_{A} receptors, which are ligand-gated chloride channels. Chloride conductance of these channels can be modulated by agents such as benzodiazepines that bind to the GABA_{A} receptor. At least 16 distinct subunits of GABA-A receptors have been identified. GABA receptors are composed of 5 subunits with an extracellular ligand binding domains and ion channel domains that are integral to the membrane. Ligand binding to these receptors activates the channel.

== Subunit selective ligands ==
Recent research has produced several ligands that are selective for GABA_{A} receptors containing the α_{3} subunit. Subtype-selective agonists for α_{3} produce anxiolytic effects without sedative, amnesia, or ataxia. Selective a_{3} agonists also show lack of dependence, and could make them superior to currently marketed drugs.

=== Agonists ===
- Adipiplon
- PWZ-029 (partial agonist at α_{3}, partial inverse agonist at α_{5})
- TP-003 (Selective full agonist at α_{3})

=== Inverse agonists ===
- α3IA

== RNA editing ==
Editing element of GABA-3 exon 9
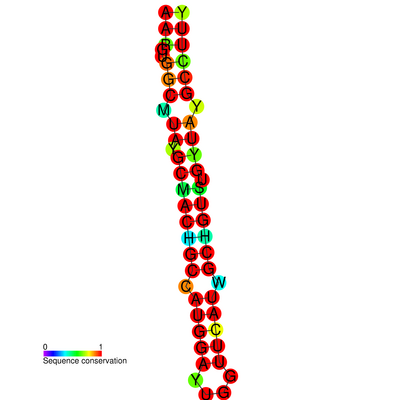
- Conserved secondary structure and sequence conservation of GABA3

Identifiers
- Symbol: GABA3
- Rfam: RF01803

Other data
- RNA type: Cis-reg;
- Domain: Eukaryota;
- SO: SO:0005836
- PDB structures: PDBe

The GABRA3 transcript undergoes pre-mRNA editing by the ADAR family of enzymes. A-to-I editing changes an isoleucine codon to code for a methionine residue. This editing is thought to be important for brain development, as the level of editing is low at birth and becomes almost 100% in an adult brain.

The editing occurs in an RNA stem-loop found in exon 9. The structured loci was identified using a specialised bioinformatics screen of the human genome. The proposed function of the edit is to alter chloride permeability of the GABA receptor.

At the time of discovery, Kv1.1 mRNA was the only previously known mammalian coding site containing both the edit sequence and the editing complementary sequence.

=== Type ===
A to I RNA editing is catalyzed by a family of adenosine deaminases acting on RNA (ADARs) that specifically recognize adenosines within double-stranded regions of pre-mRNAs and deaminate them to inosine. Inosines are recognised as guanosine by the cells translational machinery. There are three members of the ADAR family ADARs 1–3, with ADAR1 and ADAR2 being the only enzymatically active members. ADAR3 is thought to have a regulatory role in the brain. ADAR1 and ADAR 2 are widely expressed in tissues, while ADAR3 is restricted to the brain. The double-stranded regions of RNA are formed by base-pairing between residues in the close to region of the editing site, with residues usually in a neighboring intron but can be an exonic sequence. The region that base pairs with the editing region is known as an Editing Complementary Sequence (ECS).

=== Location ===
The editing site was previously believed to be a single nucleotide polymorphism. The editing site is found at amino acid 5 of transmembrane domain 3 of exon 9. The predicted double-stranded RNA structure is interrupted by three bulges and a mismatch at the editing site. The double-stranded region is 22 base pairs in length. As with editing of the KCNA1 gene product, the editing region and the editing complementary sequence are both found in exonic regions. In the pre=mRNA of GABRA3, both are found within exon 9. The other subunits of the receptor are thought not to be edited, as their predicted secondary structure is less likely to be edited. Also, alpha subunits 1 and 6 have a uridine instead of an adenosine at the site corresponding to the editing site in alpha subunit 3. Point mutation experiments determined that a Cytidine 15 nucleotides from the editing site is the base opposite the edited base. Using a GABRA3 mini-gene that encodes for exon 9 cotransfected to HEK293 cells with either ADAR1 or -2 or none, it was determined that both active ADARs can efficiently edited the site in exon 9.

=== Regulation ===
The mRNA expression of the alpha 3 subunit is developmentally regulated. It is the dominant subunit in the forebrain tissue at birth, gradually decreasing in prominence as alpha subunit 1 takes over. Also experiments with mice have demonstrated that editing of pre-mRNA alpha 3 subunit increases from 50% at birth to nearly 100% in adult. Editing levels are lower in the hippocampus

=== Conservation ===
At the location corresponding to the I/M site of GABRA3 in frog and pufferfish there is a genomically encoded methionine. In all other species, there is an isoleucine at the position.

=== Consequences ===
==== Structure ====
Editing results in a codon change from (AUA) I to (AUG) M at the editing site. This results in translation of a methionine instead of an isoleucine at the I/M site. The amino acid change occurs in the transmembrane domain 3. The 4 transmembrane domains of each of the 5 subunits that make up the receptor interact to form the receptor channel. It is likely that the change of amino acids disturbs the structure, effecting gating and inactivation of the channel. This is because methionine has a larger side chain.

==== Function ====
While the effect of editing on protein function is unknown, the developmental increase in editing does correspond to changes in function of the GABA_{A} receptor. GABA binding leads to chloride channel activation, resulting in rapid increase in concentration of the ion. Initially, the receptor is an excitatory receptor, mediating depolarisation (efflux of Cl^{−} ions) in immature neurons before changing to an inhibitory receptor, mediating hyperpolarisation (influx of Cl^{−} ions) later on. GABA_{A} converts to an inhibitory receptor from an excitatory receptor by the upregulation of KCC2 cotransporter. This decreases the concentration of Cl^{−} ion within cells. Therefore, the GABA_{A} subunits are involved in determining the nature of the receptor in response to GABA ligand. These changes suggest that editing of the subunit is important in the developing brain by regulating the Cl^{−} permeability of the channel during development. The unedited receptor is activated faster and deactivates slower than the edited receptor.

== See also ==
- GABA_{A} receptor
