= GABRA5 =

Protein found in humans

Identifiers
- Aliases: GABRA5, gamma-aminobutyric acid type A receptor alpha5 subunit, EIEE79, gamma-aminobutyric acid type A receptor subunit alpha5, DEE79
- External IDs: OMIM: 137142; MGI: 95617; GeneCards: GABRA5

Gene location (Human)
Chr.	Chromosome 15 (human)
Band	15q12	Start	26,866,911 bp
Band	15q12	End	26,949,208 bp

Gene location (Mouse)
Chr.	Chromosome 7 (mouse)
Band	7 B5|7 33.52 cM	Start	57,057,420 bp
Band	7 B5|7 33.52 cM	End	57,159,807 bp
RNA expression pattern
Bgee	Human / Mouse (ortholog); Top expressed in: nucleus accumbens; prefrontal cortex; Brodmann area 10; cingulate gyrus; anterior cingulate cortex; orbitofrontal cortex; dorsolateral prefrontal cortex; hippocampus proper; Region I of hippocampus proper; Brodmann area 9 / Top expressed in: subdivision of hippocampus; Region I of hippocampus proper; hippocampus proper; Subplate; dentate gyrus; dentate gyrus of hippocampal formation granule cell; ventromedial nucleus; lumbar subsegment of spinal cord; subiculum; arcuate nucleus; More reference expression data
BioGPS	n/a
Gene ontology
Molecular function	GABA-A receptor activity; transporter activity; ion channel activity; chloride channel activity; extracellular ligand-gated ion channel activity; transmembrane signaling receptor activity; signaling receptor activity; GABA receptor binding; inhibitory extracellular ligand-gated ion channel activity; benzodiazepine receptor activity; GABA-gated chloride ion channel activity; transmitter-gated ion channel activity involved in regulation of postsynaptic membrane potential
Cellular component	integral component of membrane; cell body; GABA-A receptor complex; postsynaptic membrane; membrane; receptor complex; synapse; integral component of plasma membrane; chloride channel complex; neuronal cell body membrane; dendrite; nucleoplasm; cytosol; plasma membrane; cell junction; GABA-ergic synapse; integral component of postsynaptic membrane; integral component of presynaptic membrane; integral component of postsynaptic specialization membrane; dendrite membrane; neuron projection; postsynapse
Biological process	gamma-aminobutyric acid signaling pathway; negative regulation of neuron apoptotic process; cochlea development; associative learning; regulation of neuron apoptotic process; neuron development; chloride transmembrane transport; hearing; ion transport; behavioral fear response; brain development; inner ear receptor cell development; chloride transport; innervation; signal transduction; chemical synaptic transmission; ion transmembrane transport; regulation of membrane potential; nervous system process; synaptic transmission, GABAergic; regulation of postsynaptic membrane potential
Sources:Amigo / QuickGO
Orthologs
Databases	NCBI: entry; OMA: entry
Species	Human	Mouse
Entrez	2558	110886
Ensembl	ENSG00000186297	ENSMUSG00000055078
UniProt	P31644	Q8BHJ7
RefSeq (mRNA)	NM_000810; NM_001165037	NM_176942; NM_001362161; NM_001362162
RefSeq (protein)	NP_000801; NP_001158509	NP_795916; NP_001349090; NP_001349091
Location (UCSC)	Chr 15: 26.87 – 26.95 Mb	Chr 7: 57.06 – 57.16 Mb
PubMed search
- Wikidata
View/Edit Human	View/Edit Mouse

Gamma-aminobutyric acid (GABA) A receptor, alpha 5, also known as GABRA5, is a protein which in humans is encoded by the GABRA5 gene.

== Function ==
GABA is the major inhibitory neurotransmitter in the mammalian brain where it acts at GABA_{A} receptors, which are ligand-gated chloride channels. Chloride conductance of these channels can be modulated by agents such as benzodiazepines that bind to the GABA_{A} receptor. At least 16 distinct subunits of GABA_{A} receptors have been identified. Transcript variants utilizing three different alternative non-coding first exons have been described.

== Subunit selective ligands ==
Recent research has produced several ligands which are moderately selective for GABA_{A} receptors containing the α_{5} subunit. These have proved to be useful in investigating some of the side effects of benzodiazepine and nonbenzodiazepine drugs, particularly the effects on learning and memory such as anterograde amnesia. Inverse agonists at this subunit have nootropic effects and may be useful for the treatment of cognitive disorders such as Alzheimer's disease.

=== Agonists ===
- QH-ii-066
- SH-053-R-CH3-2′F

=== Antagonists ===
- α_{5}IA
- Basmisanil (RG-1662, RO5186582): derivative of Ro4938581, negative allosteric modulator at GABA_{A} α_{5}, in human trials for treating cognitive deficit in Down syndrome.
- L-655,708
- MRK-016
- PWZ-029: moderate inverse agonist
- Pyridazines
- Ro4938581
- TB-21007

== See also ==
- GABA_{A} receptor
