= Anxiogenic =

Substance that causes anxiety

An anxiogenic or panicogenic substance is one that causes anxiety. This effect is in contrast to anxiolytic agents, which inhibits anxiety. Together these categories of psychoactive compounds may be referred to as anxiotropic compounds.

== Experimental studies ==
Anxiogenic effects can be measured by, for example, the hole-board test in rats and mice. A number of agents are used to provoke anxiety (anxiogens) or panic (panicogens) in experimental models.

== Mechanisms of action ==
Anxiogenic substances typically work through affecting levels of neurotransmitters such as dopamine, epinephrine, gamma-aminobutyric acid (GABA), norepinephrine (NE), and serotonin in the central nervous system (CNS). Some substances may alter functioning in the HPA axis, the neuroendocrine system that mediates responses to stress, where dysfunction has been linked to anxiety and panic disorders.

Some substances, such as caffeine and sodium lactate, are largely reported to have anxiogenic effects only if they are consumed or taken by people with pre-existing anxiety or panic disorders.

== Anxiogenic substances ==
=== Psychoactive substances ===
A psychoactive substance is one that alters the functioning of the nervous system to produce changes in cognition and behaviour and include commonly consumed substances such as caffeine and nicotine. Though not typically the desired response, several of these compounds may have anxiogenic side effects.

==== Caffeine ====
Caffeine, found in tea and coffee, acts as an adenosine receptor antagonist. Adenosine receptors are involved in mood regulation among other functions, with its antagonists linked to general anxiogenic effects, and specific receptors, such as the A_{2A} receptor disorders.

However, research suggests that for caffeine to have notable anxiogenic effects when consumed, a person needs to have a pre-existing anxiety or panic disorder, and to consume a large amount of caffeine (5 cups or more).

==== Nicotine ====
Nicotine, found in tobacco products, binds to nicotinic acetylcholine receptors (nACHRs), that may affect the function of pathways implicated with stress brains and anxiety, such as the serotonergic or GABAergic pathways.

Though nicotine is typically associated with a reduction in levels of anxiety, animal studies have found that at higher dosages, nicotine may have anxiogenic effects compared to its typical anxiolytic effects at lower dosages.

=== Adrenergic agents ===
Adrenergic agents affect the levels of norepinephrine and epinephrine in the nervous system. NE is a neurotransmitter associated with the regulation of various cognitive functions including stress responses, arousal, vigilance, and anxiety. Norepinephrine reuptake inhibitors are an example of the class including marketed drugs.

Yohimbine is an adrenergic agent that increases the levels of NE through inhibiting the absorption of NE by blocking the receptors on noradrenergic neurons. Research suggests that it can lead to a mildly anxious state or worsen panic, anxiety, and related symptoms in PTSD patients.

=== Serotonergic agents ===
Serotonergic agents affect the neurotransmission pathways that involve serotonin, a neurotransmitter associated with mood regulation. Serotonin agonists can bind to and activate serotonin receptors, increasing the levels of serotonin in the CNS and resultingly increasing the occurrence of behaviours associated with anxiety. Research supports the resulting anxiogenic effects of agents such as LY-293,284 and mCPP in the CNS.

=== Antibiotics ===
Fluroquinolones (FQs), such as ciprofloxacin, levofloxacin, and moxifloxacin, are a type of antibiotic that have been linked to increased levels of anxiety and panic attacks, psychotic symptoms, and depression in both mice and humans, with adverse neuropsychiatric reactions estimated to occur in 1–4.4% of patients, across a range of mild to more severe cases. However, some of these effects may be resolved by the patient ceasing the course of antibiotics, instead of through therapeutic action.

The mechanism behind this action is unclear however, with some researchers suggesting that FQs may act as low-affinity GABA-A antagonists, and others positing that its interactions with N-methyl-D-aspartate (NMDA) receptors, which have been associated with fear, anxiety, and depression, may be responsible for the anxiogenic effects.

=== Sodium lactate ===
Sodium lactate given intravenously has been proven to cause panic attacks in people with a panic disorder but not in people with no such history.

=== Miscellaneous ===
Other substances that may have anxiogenic effects include:

- carbon dioxide (as a carbogen),
- cocaine
- substituted amphetamines
- L-DOPA
- methylphenidate
- modafinil
- GABA antagonists such as DMCM, FG-7142, and ZK-93426
- psychoactive agents such as THC and LSD in susceptible individuals
- antipsychotics/dopamine antagonists such as ecopipam and reserpine
- cholecystokinin (CCK) (especially the tetrapeptide and octapeptide fragments CCK-4 and CCK-8)

== Anxiolytic substances ==
Anxiolytic substances have the opposite effect to anxiogenic substances in that they reduce levels of anxiety. Some of these are used in psychopharmacotherapy as antidepressants to treat a range of mental health conditions, including various types of anxiety disorders, panic disorders, and depression. Typical antidepressants prescribed in psychiatry today include selective serotonin reuptake inhibitors (SSRIs) and benzodiazepines.

Though these substances are typically used to decrease anxiety through affecting levels of neurotransmitters, some may have anxiogenic effects.

=== SSRIs ===
SSRIs are a commonly prescribed type of antidepressants that are used to treat anxiety and depression in the long term by increasing levels of serotonin in the CNS through blocking the reabsorption of serotonin. However, SSRIs are ineffective in the short-term treatment of acute panic attacks or acute anxiety.

Clinical research suggests that SSRIs may have a biphasic response, with research suggesting that citalopram may have immediate anxiogenic effects from one dosage but long-term anxiolytic effects after three dosages in mice, supporting clinical findings of exacerbated anxiety preceding the beneficial effects from SSRIs. Other research suggests that at low doses, paroxetine induces an anxiogenic-like response in rats

=== Benzodiazepines ===
Benzodiazepines are a class of depressant drugs used to treat anxiety disorders by acting as GABA receptor agonists and affecting the levels of GABA within the CNS.

However, studies suggest that benzodiazepines may be anxiogenic in the long term. Different benzodiazepines have different effects, such as β-CCM which has been linked to anxiogenic effects, unlike Ro 15-17888.

== See also ==
- Anxiolytic
- Depressogen
- Selective serotonin reuptake inhibitor
