= Inverse agonist =

Agent in biochemistry

Dose response curves of a full agonist, partial agonist, neutral antagonist, and inverse agonist

In pharmacology, an inverse agonist is a drug that binds to the same receptor as an agonist but induces a pharmacological response opposite to that of the agonist.

A neutral antagonist has no activity in the absence of an agonist or inverse agonist but can block the activity of either; they are in fact sometimes called blockers (examples include alpha blockers, beta blockers, and calcium channel blockers). Inverse agonists have opposite actions to those of agonists but the effects of both of these can be blocked by antagonists.

A prerequisite for an inverse agonist response is that the receptor must have a constitutive (also known as intrinsic or basal) level of activity in the absence of any ligand. An agonist increases the activity of a receptor above its basal level, whereas an inverse agonist decreases the activity below the basal level.

The efficacy of a full agonist is by definition 100%, a neutral antagonist has 0% efficacy, and an inverse agonist has < 0% (i.e., negative) efficacy.

== Examples ==
Receptors for which inverse agonists have been identified include the GABA_{A}, melanocortin, mu opioid, histamine, serotonin, and beta adrenergic receptors. Both endogenous and exogenous inverse agonists have been identified, as have drugs at ligand gated ion channels and at G protein-coupled receptors.

=== Ligand gated ion channel inverse agonists ===
An example of a receptor site that possesses basal activity and for which inverse agonists have been identified is the GABA_{A} receptors. Agonists for GABA_{A} receptors (such as muscimol) create a relaxant effect, whereas inverse agonists have agitation effects (for example, Ro15-4513) or even convulsive and anxiogenic effects (certain beta-carbolines).

=== G protein-coupled receptor inverse agonists ===
Two known endogenous inverse agonists are the Agouti-related peptide (AgRP) and its associated peptide Agouti signalling peptide (ASIP). AgRP and ASIP appear naturally in humans and bind melanocortin receptors 4 and 1 (Mc4R and Mc1R), respectively, with nanomolar affinities.

The opioid antagonists naloxone and naltrexone act as neutral antagonists of the mu opioid receptors under normal conditions, but as inverse agonists when chronic exposure to opioids has increased the basal activity of the mu opioid receptors. 6α-naltrexo, 6β-naltrexol, 6β-naloxol, and 6β-naltrexamine acted neutral antagonists regardless of opioid binding and caused significantly reduced withdrawal jumping when compared to naloxone and naltrexone.

Nearly all antihistamines acting at H1 receptors and H2 receptors have been shown to be inverse agonists.

The beta blockers carvedilol and bucindolol have been shown to be low level inverse agonists at beta adrenoceptors.

== Mechanisms of action ==
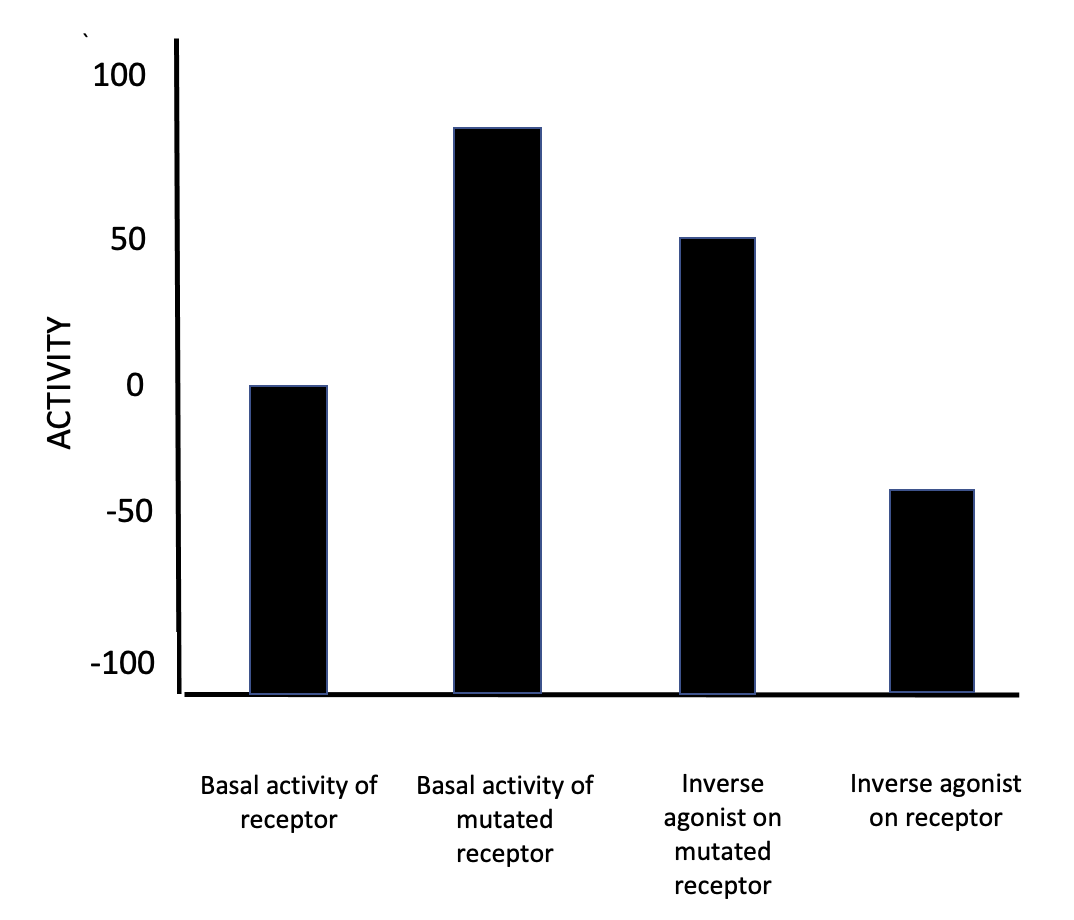
Figure 2: Example of changes in Intrinsic activity based on mutations and the presence of inverse agonists. (assuming the inverse agonist has the same binding affinity for both the normal and mutated receptor)

Like agonists, inverse agonists have their own unique ways of inducing pharmacological and physiological responses depending on many factors, such as the type of inverse agonist, the type of receptor, mutants of receptors, binding affinities and whether the effects are exerted acutely or chronically based on receptor population density. Because of this, they exhibit a spectrum of activity below the Intrinsic activity level. Changes in constitutive activity of receptors affect response levels from ligands like inverse agonists.

To illustrate, mechanistic models have been made for how inverse agonists induce their responses on G protein-coupled receptors (GPCRs). Many types of Inverse agonists for GPCRs have been shown to exhibit the following conventionally accepted mechanism.

Based on the Extended Ternary complex model, the mechanism contends that inverse agonists switch the receptor from an active state to an inactive state by undergoing conformational changes. Under this model, current thinking is that the GPCRs can exist in a continuum of active and inactive states when no ligand is present. Inverse agonists stabilize the inactive states, thereby suppressing agonist-independent activity. However, the implementation of 'constitutively active mutants' of GPCRs change their intrinsic activity. Thus, the effect an inverse agonist has on a receptor depends on the basal activity of the receptor, assuming the inverse agonist has the same binding affinity (as shown in the figure 2).

== See also ==
- Agonist
- Receptor antagonist
- Autoreceptor
