= SKF-77,434 =

Chemical compound

Identifiers
- IUPAC name: 3-allyl-1-phenyl-1,2,4,5-tetrahydro-3-benzazepine-7,8-diol
- CAS Number: 104422-04-0
- PubChem CID: 1241
- ChemSpider: 1204
- UNII: XA99M7XZR5
- ChEBI: CHEBI:63988
- ChEMBL: ChEMBL288090
- CompTox Dashboard (EPA): DTXSID3043817

Chemical and physical data
- Formula: C_{19}H_{21}NO_{2}
- Molar mass: 295.382 g·mol^{−1}
- 3D model (JSmol): Interactive image
- SMILES: c3ccccc3C2CN(CC=C)CCc(cc1O)c2cc1O
- InChI: InChI=1S/C19H21NO2/c1-2-9-20-10-8-15-11-18(21)19(22)12-16(15)17(13-20)14-6-4-3-5-7-14/h2-7,11-12,17,21-22H,1,8-10,13H2; Key:QBUVZVXIRYFENV-UHFFFAOYSA-N

SKF-77,434 is a drug which acts as a selective dopamine D_{1} receptor partial agonist, and has stimulant and anorectic effects. Unlike other D_{1} agonists with higher efficacy such as SKF-81,297 and 6-Br-APB, SKF-77,434 does not maintain self-administration in animal studies, and so has been researched as a potential treatment for cocaine addiction.

== See also ==
- Substituted 3-benzazepine
