= SKF-39315 =

Clinical data
- Other names: SKF39315; SKF-39315A; SK&F-39315A

Identifiers
- IUPAC name: 2,3,4,5-tetrahydro-1H-3-benzazepine-7,8-diol
- CAS Number: 138355-28-9
- PubChem CID: 10058098
- ChemSpider: 8233652
- ChEMBL: ChEMBL57873

Chemical and physical data
- Formula: C_{10}H_{13}NO_{2}
- Molar mass: 179.219 g·mol^{−1}
- 3D model (JSmol): Interactive image
- SMILES: C1CNCCC2=CC(=C(C=C21)O)O
- InChI: InChI=1S/C10H13NO2/c12-9-5-7-1-3-11-4-2-8(7)6-10(9)13/h5-6,11-13H,1-4H2; Key:LPJMTSQTVDKBCO-UHFFFAOYSA-N

SKF-39315 is a monoamine receptor modulator of the 3-benzazepine family. It is a cyclized phenethylamine analogue of the neurotransmitter dopamine. The drug shows affinities (K_{i}) of 12 nM for the dopamine D_{2} receptor and 5,200 nM for the dopamine D_{1} receptor. It also has direct and indirect adrenergic actions. The 1-phenyl derivative of SKF-39315 is SKF-38393, which has reversed activities at dopamine receptors compared to SKF-39315 and acts as a selective dopamine D_{1}-like receptor agonist. SKF-39315 was first described in the scientific literature by at least 1988.

== See also ==
- Substituted 3-benzazepine
- Norsalsolinol
