= PF-06412562 =

Clinical data
- Other names: PF06412562; PF-6412562; PF6412562; CVL-562; CVL562
- Routes of administration: Oral
- Drug class: Dopamine D_{1} and D_{5} receptor agonist

Identifiers
- IUPAC name: 4-[4-(4,6-dimethylpyrimidin-5-yl)-3-methylphenoxy]-1H-pyrazolo[4,5-c]pyridine
- CAS Number: 1609258-91-4
- PubChem CID: 74223726
- ChemSpider: 58828672
- UNII: 79S803X0GW
- ChEMBL: ChEMBL3671276

Chemical and physical data
- Formula: C_{19}H_{17}N_{5}O
- Molar mass: 331.379 g·mol^{−1}
- 3D model (JSmol): Interactive image
- SMILES: CC1=C(C=CC(=C1)OC2=NC=CC3=C2C=NN3)C4=C(N=CN=C4C)C
- InChI: InChI=1S/C19H17N5O/c1-11-8-14(25-19-16-9-23-24-17(16)6-7-20-19)4-5-15(11)18-12(2)21-10-22-13(18)3/h4-10H,1-3H3,(H,23,24); Key:IDIUJOHYYBNCPC-UHFFFAOYSA-N

PF-06412562, also known as CVL-562, is a moderately potent and highly selective dopamine D_{1} and D_{5} receptor partial agonist which is under development for the treatment of the cognitive symptoms of schizophrenia. It is taken orally. The drug has been reported to produce pro-motivational effects in humans. PF-06412562 is under development by Pfizer and Cerevel Therapeutics. As of August 2025, it is in phase 1/2 clinical trials. The drug was also under development for the treatment of Parkinson's disease and cognition disorders, but development for these indications was discontinued. Its development for Parkinson's disease was discontinued for business reasons unrelated to safety in 2017.

== See also ==
- List of investigational antipsychotics
- List of investigational cognition and memory disorder drugs
- List of investigational Parkinson's disease drugs
- Razpipadon and tavapadon
- Mevidalen and glovadalen
