= C21H25N3O2 =

The molecular formula C_{21}H_{25}N_{3}O_{2} (molar mass: 351.45 g/mol) may refer to:

- GSK-189254
- 1F-LSD
- Tolserine
