= Glovadalen =

D1 receptor positive allosteric modulator under development for Parkinson's disease

Clinical data
- Other names: UCB-0022; UCB0022

Identifiers
- IUPAC name: 2-(3,5-dichloro-1-methylindazol-4-yl)-1-[(1S,3R)-3-(hydroxymethyl)-5-(2-hydroxypropan-2-yl)-1-methyl-3,4-dihydro-1H-isoquinolin-2-yl]ethanone
- CAS Number: 2576359-31-2
- PubChem CID: 155460962
- IUPHAR/BPS: 13232
- ChemSpider: 133324299
- UNII: H8T5VKH4CZ
- KEGG: D13239
- ChEMBL: ChEMBL6068015

Chemical and physical data
- Formula: C_{24}H_{27}Cl_{2}N_{3}O_{3}
- Molar mass: 476.40 g·mol^{−1}
- 3D model (JSmol): Interactive image
- SMILES: C[C@H]1C2=C(C[C@@H](N1C(=O)CC3=C(C=CC4=C3C(=NN4C)Cl)Cl)CO)C(=CC=C2)C(C)(C)O
- InChI: InChI=1S/C24H27Cl2N3O3/c1-13-15-6-5-7-18(24(2,3)32)16(15)10-14(12-30)29(13)21(31)11-17-19(25)8-9-20-22(17)23(26)27-28(20)4/h5-9,13-14,30,32H,10-12H2,1-4H3/t13-,14+/m0/s1; Key:SVTDEVFVOSMAQQ-UONOGXRCSA-N

Glovadalen (developmental code name UCB-0022) is a dopamine D_{1} receptor positive allosteric modulator which is under development for the treatment of Parkinson's disease. It has been found to potentiate the capacity of dopamine to activate the D_{1} receptor by 10-fold in vitro with no actions on other dopamine receptors. As of May 2024, glovadalen is in phase 2 clinical trials for this indication. The drug is under development by UCB Biopharma. It is described as an orally active, centrally penetrant small molecule.

== See also ==
- List of investigational Parkinson's disease drugs
- DETQ
- Mevidalen
- ASP-4345
- PF-06412562 (CVL-562)
- Razpipadon (CVL-871)
- Tavapadon (CVL-751)
