= SKF-81,297 =

Synthetic drug, a stimulant

Clinical data
- Other names: SKF81297; SKF-81297; SK&F-81297; SK&F-81,297; SK&F81297
- Routes of administration: Oral
- Drug class: Dopamine receptor agonist; Dopamine D_{1}-like receptor agonist; Stimulant; Antiparkinsonian agent
- ATC code: None

Identifiers
- IUPAC name: 9-chloro-5-phenyl-2,3,4,5-tetrahydro-1H-3-benzazepine-7,8-diol
- CAS Number: 71636-61-8
- PubChem CID: 1218
- ChemSpider: 1181
- UNII: 9GBP09E08K
- ChEBI: CHEBI:91517
- ChEMBL: ChEMBL353335
- CompTox Dashboard (EPA): DTXSID3058743

Chemical and physical data
- Formula: C_{16}H_{16}ClNO_{2}
- Molar mass: 289.76 g·mol^{−1}
- 3D model (JSmol): Interactive image
- SMILES: C1CNCC(C2=CC(=C(C(=C21)Cl)O)O)C3=CC=CC=C3
- InChI: InChI=1S/C16H16ClNO2/c17-15-11-6-7-18-9-13(10-4-2-1-3-5-10)12(11)8-14(19)16(15)20/h1-5,8,13,18-20H,6-7,9H2; Key:GHWJEDJMOVUXEC-UHFFFAOYSA-N

SKF-81,297 is a dopamine D_{1}-like receptor agonist and stimulant-like drug of the 3-benzazepine family which was under development for the treatment of Parkinson's disease but was never marketed. It is a cyclized phenethylamine and catecholamine and is a modified derivative of the monoamine neurotransmitter dopamine. The drug is taken orally.

The drug acts as a selective dopamine D_{1} and D_{5} receptor full agonist. In addition, it acts as a partial agonist at dopamine D_{1}–D_{2} receptor heteromers. It produces a characteristic stimulant-like pattern of effects including anorexia, hyperactivity, and self-administration in animals. This profile is shared with several related drugs such as 6-Br-APB and SKF-82,958, but not with certain other dopamine D_{1} receptor full agonists such as A-77,636, reflecting functional selectivity of dopamine D_{1} receptor activation. The drug also produces pro-motivational effects in animals.

Although it produces stimulant-like effects in animals, SKF-81,297 did not substitute for dextroamphetamine in rodent drug discrimination tests in multiple studies. This is in notable contrast to dopamine D_{2} receptor agonists like quinpirole and RU-24213, which fully substitute for dextroamphetamine in such tests. However, in another study, higher doses of SKF-81,297 were able to partially substitute for dextroamphetamine.

SKF-81,297 readily crosses the blood–brain barrier in rodents and shows substantially greater penetration than the related dopamine D_{1}-like receptor agonist SKF-38,393. Its predicted log P is 2.7.

SKF-81,297 was first described in the scientific literature by 1988. It was developed by GlaxoSmithKline. The drug reached the preclinical research stage of development for Parkinson's disease prior to the discontinuation of its development. One of the patented uses for SKF-81,297 is as an augmentation agent when combined with an appropriate choice of an antidepressant.

== See also ==
- Substituted 3-benzazepine
- Cyclized phenethylamine
- List of investigational Parkinson's disease drugs
- Motivation-enhancing drug
