= Substituted 3-benzazepine =

Class of chemical compounds

SKF-81297, a dopamine D_{1}-like receptor agonist of the 3-benzazepine group.

A substituted 3-benzazepine, or simply 3-benzazepine, is a derivative of 3-benzazepine. They are cyclized phenethylamines and are closely related to the tetrahydroisoquinolines. In addition, they are analogous to the cyclized tryptamine ibogalogs and their β-carboline relatives.

3-Benzazepines are known to act as monoamine receptor modulators, including as dopamine D_{1}-like receptor agonists, dopamine D_{1} receptor antagonists, and serotonin 5-HT_{2A}, 5-HT_{2B}, and 5-HT_{2C} receptor agonists, among other activities. 3-Benzazepines acting as serotonin 5-HT_{2} receptor agonists generally show varying degrees of preferential activity at the serotonin 5-HT_{2C} receptor over the serotonin 5-HT_{2A} receptor, with occasional exceptions. One 3-benzazepine, the non-selective serotonin 5-HT_{2} receptor agonist and previously marketed anorectic lorcaserin (Belviq), is known to produce psychedelic effects at supratherapeutic doses.

== List of 3-benzazepines ==
Structure	Name	Action	Chemical name	Ref
	3-Benzazepine	N/A	3H-3-benzazepine	
	2,3,4,5-Tetrahydro-1H-3-benzazepine	N/A	2,3,4,5-tetrahydro-1H-benzo[d]azepine	
	SKF-39315	D_{1}-like agonist	2,3,4,5-tetrahydro-1H-3-benzazepine-7,8-diol	
	Lorcaserin	5-HT_{2} agonist	(1R)-8-chloro-1-methyl-2,3,4,5-tetrahydro-1H-3-benzazepine	
	7-Chlorolorcaserin	5-HT_{2} agonist	(1R)-7,8-dichloro-1-methyl-2,3,4,5-tetrahydro-1H-3-benzazepine	
	SCHEMBL5334361	5-HT_{2} agonist	7-[(3-methoxyphenoxy)methyl]-2,3,4,5-tetrahydro-1H-3-benzazepine	
	SKF-38393	D_{1}-like agonist	1-phenyl-2,3,4,5-tetrahydro-1H-3-benzazepine-7,8-diol	
	SKF-81297	D_{1}-like agonist	(1R)-6-chloro-1-phenyl-2,3,4,5-tetrahydro-1H-3-benzazepine-7,8-diol	
	Fenoldopam	D_{1}-like agonist	6-chloro-1-(4-hydroxyphenyl)-2,3,4,5-tetrahydro-1H-3-benzazepine-7,8-diol	
	SCH-23390	D_{1} antagonist	(5R)-8-chloro-3-methyl-5-phenyl-2,3,4,5-tetrahydro-1H-3-benzazepin-7-ol	
	SKF-83959	D_{1}-like agonist	6-chloro-3-methyl-1-(3-methylphenyl)-2,3,4,5-tetrahydro-1H-3-benzazepine-7,8-diol	
	Trepipam (SCH-12679)	D_{1}-like agonist	7,8-dimethoxy-3-methyl-1-phenyl-2,3,4,5-tetrahydro-1H-3-benzazepine	
	SKF-77434	D_{1}-like agonist	(1R)-1-phenyl-3-(prop-2-en-1-yl)-2,3,4,5-tetrahydro-1H-3-benzazepine-7,8-diol	
	SKF-82958	D_{1}-like agonist	(1R)-6-chloro-1-phenyl-3-(prop-2-en-1-yl)-2,3,4,5-tetrahydro-1H-3-benzazepine-7,8-diol	
	6-Br-APB	D_{1}-like agonist	(1R)-6-bromo-1-phenyl-3-(prop-2-en-1-yl)-2,3,4,5-tetrahydro-1H-3-benzazepine-7,8-diol	
	Odapipam (NNC 01–0756)	D_{1} antagonist	(5S)-8-chloro-5-(2,3-dihydro-1-benzofuran-7-yl)-3-methyl-1,2,4,5-tetrahydro-3-benzazepin-7-ol	
	Berupipam (NNC 22–0010)	D_{1} antagonist	(5S)-5-(5-bromo-2,3-dihydro-1-benzofuran-7-yl)-8-chloro-3-methyl-1,2,4,5-tetrahydro-3-benzazepin-7-ol	
	NNC 01-0687 (ADX-10061, CEE-03-310)	D_{1} antagonist	(5S)-5-(2,3-dihydro-1-benzofuran-7-yl)-3-methyl-8-nitro-1,2,4,5-tetrahydro-3-benzazepin-7-ol	
	GSK-189254	H_{3} antagonist	6-[(3-cyclobutyl-2,3,4,5-tetrahydro-1H-3-benzazepin-7-yl)oxy]-N-methylpyridine-3-carboxamide	
	Anilopam (PR 786–723)	Opioid	4-[2-(7-methoxy-4-methyl-1,2,4,5-tetrahydro-3-benzazepin-3-yl)ethyl]aniline	

== Related compounds ==
Structure	Name	Action	Chemical name	Ref
	PF-04479745 (PF-4479745)	5-HT_{2} modulator	(9S)-2-benzyl-N,9-dimethyl-6,7,8,9-tetrahydro-5H-pyrimido[4,5-d]azepin-4-amine	
	PF-04781340	5-HT_{2} modulator	3-benzyl-N-methyl-6,7,8,9-tetrahydro-5H-pyrido[3,4-d]azepin-1-amine	
	PF-4522654 (PF-04522654)	5-HT_{2} modulator	2-[difluoro(phenyl)methyl]-N-methyl-6,7,8,9-tetrahydro-5H-pyrimido[4,5-d]azepin-4-amine	

== See also ==
- Benzazepine
- Cyclized phenethylamine
- Substituted tetrahydroisoquinoline
- Ibogalog
- Iboga alkaloid
- Substituted β-carboline
