= ASP-4345 =

Clinical data
- Other names: ASP4345
- Routes of administration: Oral
- Drug class: Dopamine D_{1} receptor positive allosteric modulator
- ATC code: None

Pharmacokinetic data
- Elimination half-life: 9.1–26.8 hours

Identifiers
- IUPAC name: 2-(5-chloro-2-oxo-1,3-benzoxazol-3-yl)-N-methyl-N-[[6-(trifluoromethyl)-1H-benzimidazol-2-yl]methyl]acetamide
- CAS Number: 1632257-75-0
- PubChem CID: 85470885
- ChemSpider: 128727345
- UNII: JT5NU1K4F2
- ChEMBL: ChEMBL4558647

Chemical and physical data
- Formula: C_{19}H_{14}ClF_{3}N_{4}O_{3}
- Molar mass: 438.79 g·mol^{−1}
- 3D model (JSmol): Interactive image
- SMILES: CN(CC1=NC2=C(N1)C=C(C=C2)C(F)(F)F)C(=O)CN3C4=C(C=CC(=C4)Cl)OC3=O
- InChI: InChI=1S/C19H14ClF3N4O3/c1-26(8-16-24-12-4-2-10(19(21,22)23)6-13(12)25-16)17(28)9-27-14-7-11(20)3-5-15(14)30-18(27)29/h2-7H,8-9H2,1H3,(H,24,25); Key:YJODOMNPYLHYJK-UHFFFAOYSA-N

ASP-4345, or ASP4345, is a dopamine D_{1} receptor positive allosteric modulator which is or was under development for the treatment of schizophrenia. It is being developed as an adjunctive therapy for the cognitive symptoms of schizophrenia. The drug is taken orally.

The most common side effects of ASP-4345 have been found to be headache and somnolence. No changes in mood or suicidality were observed. The pharmacokinetics of ASP-4345 have been studied. The median time to peak levels of ASP-4345 is 1.0 to 3.0 hours. Its mean elimination half-life is 9.1 to 26.8 hours.

ASP-4345 is or was under development by Astellas Pharma. As of March 2021, no recent development has been reported. The drug has reached phase 2 clinical trials for schizophrenia. It was found to be ineffective in a phase 2 trial.

== See also ==
- List of investigational antipsychotics
- Mevidalen (LY-3154207)
- Glovadalen (UCB-0022)
- DETQ
