= Anilopam =

Chemical compound

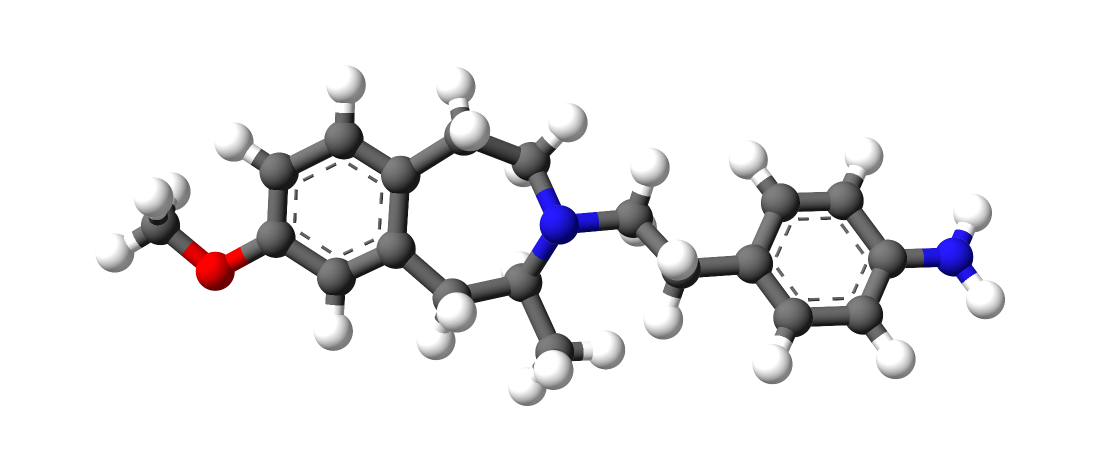

Clinical data
- ATC code: None

Legal status
- Legal status: Unregulated

Identifiers
- IUPAC name: 4-[2-(7-methoxy-4-methyl-1,2,4,5-tetrahydro-3-benzazepin-3-yl)ethyl]aniline
- CAS Number: 53716-46-4 53716-45-3 (hydrochloride)
- PubChem CID: 166550
- ChemSpider: 145753
- UNII: 34E9Q468RT
- ChEMBL: ChEMBL2110599
- CompTox Dashboard (EPA): DTXSID401016515

Chemical and physical data
- Formula: C_{20}H_{26}N_{2}O
- Molar mass: 310.441 g·mol^{−1}
- 3D model (JSmol): Interactive image
- SMILES: CC(N(CCC1=CC=C(N)C=C1)CC2)CC3=C2C=CC(O)=C3

Anilopam (INN; PR 786-723) is an opioid analgesic of the benzazepine class which was developed by Pentwell in the 1960s, but it was never marketed.

== See also ==
- Substituted 3-benzazepine
