= Mevidalen =

Chemical compound

Clinical data
- Other names: LY-3154207; LY3154207
- Routes of administration: By mouth

Identifiers
- IUPAC name: 2-(2,6-dichlorophenyl)-1-[(1S,3R)-3-(hydroxymethyl)-5-(3-hydroxy-3-methylbutyl)-1-methyl-3,4-dihydro-1H-isoquinolin-2-yl]ethanone
- CAS Number: 1638667-79-4
- PubChem CID: 86290953
- IUPHAR/BPS: 10506
- ChemSpider: 58985571
- UNII: 4A3702A96F
- KEGG: D11826
- ChEMBL: ChEMBL3421729

Chemical and physical data
- Formula: C_{24}H_{29}Cl_{2}NO_{3}
- Molar mass: 450.40 g·mol^{−1}
- 3D model (JSmol): Interactive image
- SMILES: C[C@H]1C2=CC=CC(=C2C[C@@H](N1C(=O)CC3=C(C=CC=C3Cl)Cl)CO)CCC(C)(C)O
- InChI: InChI=1S/C24H29Cl2NO3/c1-15-18-7-4-6-16(10-11-24(2,3)30)19(18)12-17(14-28)27(15)23(29)13-20-21(25)8-5-9-22(20)26/h4-9,15,17,28,30H,10-14H2,1-3H3/t15-,17+/m0/s1; Key:XHCSBQBBGNQINS-DOTOQJQBSA-N

Mevidalen (LY-3154207) is a dopaminergic drug which is under development for the treatment of Lewy body disease, including those with Parkinson's disease.

It acts as a selective positive allosteric modulator (PAM) of the dopamine D_{1} receptor. The drug is orally active and crosses the blood–brain barrier. It is a tetrahydroisoquinoline and is a close analogue of DETQ, another D_{1} receptor PAM.

Mevidalen has been found to have wakefulness-promoting effects in sleep-deprived humans. Side effects of mevidalen have been reported to include increased heart rate and blood pressure, insomnia, dizziness, nausea, vomiting, anxiety, fatigue, headaches, palpitations, and contact dermatitis, as well as falls in those with dementia.

As of November 2023, mevidalen is in phase II clinical trials for the treatment of Lewy body disease. Besides for movement disorders and dementia, D_{1} receptor PAMs like mevidalen might have value in the treatment of certain neuropsychiatric disorders, such as depression, hypersomnolence, and attention deficit hyperactivity disorder (ADHD).

== See also ==
- Glovadalen (UCB-0022)
- ASP-4345
- PF-06412562 (CVL-562)
- Razpipadon (CVL-871)
- Tavapadon
