= C16H17NO3 =

The molecular formula C_{16}H_{17}NO_{3} (molar mass: 271.31 g/mol, exact mass: 271.1208 u) may refer to:

- A-68930
- Crinine
- Higenamine, or norcoclaurine
- Normorphine
