= Razpipadon =

Chemical compound

Clinical data
- Other names: CVL-871; CVL871; PF-06669571; PF06669571; PF-6669571; PF6669571; PW-0464; PW0464
- Routes of administration: Oral
- Drug class: Dopamine receptor agonist; Dopamine D_{1} and D_{5} receptor agonist

Identifiers
- IUPAC name: (−)-(6P)-6-(4-{[3-(difluoromethoxy)pyridin-2-yl]oxy}-2-methylphenyl)-1,5-dimethylpyrimidine-2,4(1H,3H)-dione
- CAS Number: 1643489-35-3
- PubChem CID: 86764103
- ChemSpider: 58945356
- UNII: 6X6XF88J2M
- ChEMBL: ChEMBL3697578

Chemical and physical data
- Formula: C_{19}H_{17}F_{2}N_{3}O_{4}
- Molar mass: 389.359 g·mol^{−1}
- 3D model (JSmol): Interactive image
- SMILES: CC1=C(C=CC(=C1)OC2=C(C=CC=N2)OC(F)F)C3=C(C(=O)NC(=O)N3C)C
- InChI: InChI=1S/C19H17F2N3O4/c1-10-9-12(27-17-14(28-18(20)21)5-4-8-22-17)6-7-13(10)15-11(2)16(25)23-19(26)24(15)3/h4-9,18H,1-3H3,(H,23,25,26); Key:ZXIPVZWZRQCIRW-UHFFFAOYSA-N

Razpipadon (developmental codes CVL-871, PF-06669571, and PW-0464) is a dopamine receptor agonist which is under development for the treatment of dementia-related apathy. It is taken orally.

Razpipadon acts as a selective partial agonist of the dopamine D_{1} and D_{5} receptors.

The drug was originated by Pfizer and is under development by Cerevel Therapeutics. As of April 2022, razpipadon is in phase 2 clinical trials for dementia-related apathy. It was also previously under development for Parkinson's disease and cognition disorders, but development for these indications was discontinued.

== See also ==
- List of investigational cognition and memory disorder drugs
- List of investigational Parkinson's disease drugs
- 6-Br-APB
- Mevidalen (LY-3154207)
- PF-06412562
- Tavapadon (CVL-751)
