= PF-04479745 =

Chemical compound

Clinical data
- Other names: PF04479745; PF-4479745; PF4479745
- Drug class: Serotonin 5-HT_{2C} receptor biased agonist; Serotonin 5-HT_{2A} receptor antagonist; Serotonin 5-HT_{2B} receptor antagonist
- ATC code: None

Legal status
- Legal status: In general: uncontrolled

Identifiers
- IUPAC name: (9S)-2-benzyl-N,9-dimethyl-6,7,8,9-tetrahydro-5H-pyrimido[4,5-d]azepin-4-amine
- CAS Number: 1065110-43-1
- PubChem CID: 90644511
- ChemSpider: 34218743
- UNII: 73HBY5P486
- ChEMBL: ChEMBL3286556

Chemical and physical data
- Formula: C_{17}H_{22}N_{4}
- Molar mass: 282.391 g·mol^{−1}
- 3D model (JSmol): Interactive image
- SMILES: C[C@H]1CNCCC2=C1N=C(N=C2NC)CC3=CC=CC=C3
- InChI: InChI=1S/C17H22N4/c1-12-11-19-9-8-14-16(12)20-15(21-17(14)18-2)10-13-6-4-3-5-7-13/h3-7,12,19H,8-11H2,1-2H3,(H,18,20,21)/t12-/m0/s1; Key:IHHALLDEDARSAL-LBPRGKRZSA-N

PF-04479745 is a research ligand developed by Pfizer. It is related to lorcaserin, and acts as a potent and selective agonist for the 5-HT_{2C} receptor, with lower affinity and antagonist action at the related 5-HT_{2A} and 5-HT_{2B} receptor subtypes.

== See also ==
- Substituted 3-benzazepine § Related compounds
