= Ecopipam =

Investigational dopamine antagonist

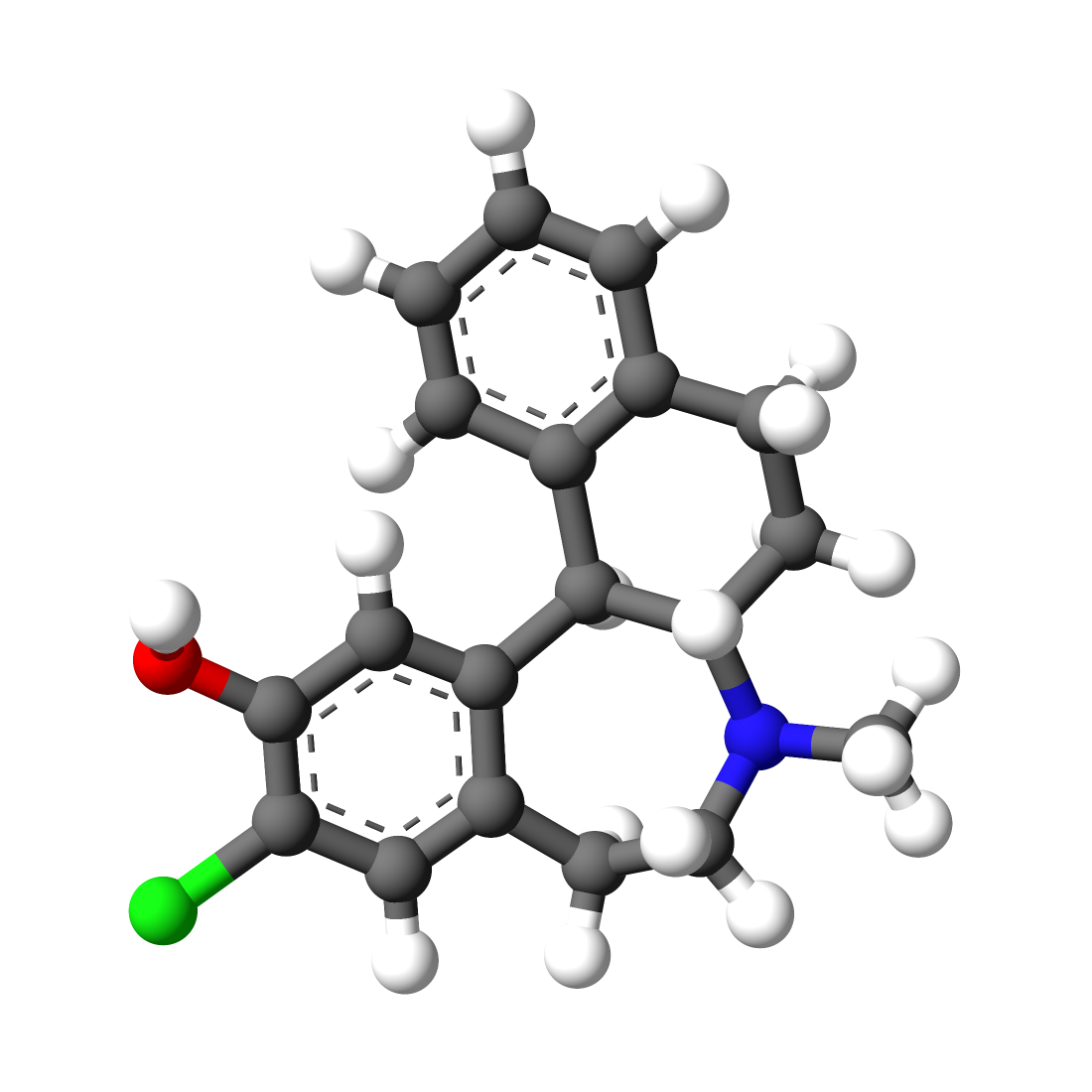

Clinical data
- Other names: EBS-101; PSYRX-101; SCH-39166
- Routes of administration: By mouth
- ATC code: none

Legal status
- Legal status: Investigational

Pharmacokinetic data
- Elimination half-life: 10 hours

Identifiers
- IUPAC name: (–)-trans-6,7,7a,8,9,13b-Hexahydro-3-chloro-2-hydroxy-N-methyl-5H-benzo[d]naptho-(2,1-b)azepine
- CAS Number: 112108-01-7
- PubChem CID: 107930
- IUPHAR/BPS: 3304
- ChemSpider: 97053
- UNII: 0X748O646K
- CompTox Dashboard (EPA): DTXSID8043814

Chemical and physical data
- Formula: C_{19}H_{20}ClNO
- Molar mass: 313.83 g·mol^{−1}
- 3D model (JSmol): Interactive image
- SMILES: CN1CCc2cc(c(cc2[C@@H]3[C@@H]1CCc4c3cccc4)O)Cl
- InChI: InChI=1S/C19H20ClNO/c1-21-9-8-13-10-16(20)18(22)11-15(13)19-14-5-3-2-4-12(14)6-7-17(19)21/h2-5,10-11,17,19,22H,6-9H2,1H3/t17-,19+/m0/s1; Key:DMJWENQHWZZWDF-PKOBYXMFSA-N

Ecopipam (development codes SCH-39166, EBS-101, and PSYRX-101) is a dopamine antagonist which is under development for the treatment of Lesch–Nyhan syndrome, Tourette syndrome, speech disorders, and restless legs syndrome. It is taken by mouth.

Ecopipam acts as a selective dopamine D_{1} and D_{5} receptor antagonist. It is orally active, has an elimination half-life of 10 hours, crosses the blood–brain barrier, and substantially occupies brain dopamine receptors. Side effects of ecopipam may include depression, anxiety, fatigue, sedation, somnolence, insomnia, headaches, muscle twitching, and suicidal ideation, among others. It appears to lack the typical extrapyramidal effects like tardive dyskinesia that occur with D_{2} receptor antagonists.

Ecopipam is an experimental drug and has not been approved for medical use. It was discovered in the CNS preclinical labs at Schering-Plough Corporation (now Merck). As of April 2024, it is in phase 3 trials for Tourette syndrome, phase 2 trials for Tourette syndrome and speech disorders, and phase 2/phase 1 trials for restless legs syndrome. The drug was also under development for the treatment of cocaine-related disorders, obesity, and schizophrenia, but development for these indications was discontinued.

== Pharmacology ==
=== Pharmacodynamics ===
Ecopipam is a selective dopamine D_{1} and D_{5} receptor antagonist. It shows little affinity for either dopamine D_{2}-like or 5-HT_{2} receptors.

== Research ==
Based on its profile in animal models, ecopipam was first studied as a treatment for schizophrenia but showed no efficacy. Side effects including sedation, restlessness, vomiting, and anxiety were generally rated mild. There were no reports of Parkinsonian-like extrapyramidal symptoms typically seen with D_{2} antagonists.

Human clinical studies also showed that ecopipam was an effective antagonist of the acute euphoric effects of cocaine. However, the effect did not persist following repeated administration. Open-label studies found ecopipam to reduce gambling behaviors in subjects with pathological gambling.

Researchers have postulated that dopamine via D_{1} receptors in the mesolimbic system are involved with rewarded behaviors and pleasure. One such behavior is eating, and ecopipam has been shown in a large clinical study to be an effective treatment for obesity. However, reports of mild-to-moderate, reversible anxiety and depression made it unsuitable for commercialization as an anti-obesity drug, and its development was stopped for that indication.

Ecopipam was under development for the treatment of Lesch–Nyhan syndrome and restless legs syndrome. It was also a first-in-class drug evaluated for the treatment of childhood-onset fluency disorder (stuttering) in adults. There are currently no U.S. Food and Drug Administration (FDA) approved medications for this disorder.

As of 2025, Emalex Biosciences is investigating its potential use for other central nervous system disorders. Open-label studies found ecopipam to decrease tic severity in adults with Tourette syndrome. A subsequent double-blind placebo-controlled study confirmed ecopipam's ability to ameliorate motor and vocal tics in pediatric participants with Tourette syndrome. A subsequent parallel-group, randomized, placebo-controlled clinical trial in children ages 7 to 17 with Tourette syndrome found ecopipam superior to placebo in reducing tic severity; response, defined as a 25% or greater improvement on the standard tic severity scale (YGTSS total tic score), occurred in 74% of participants taking ecopipam versus 43% of those on placebo (odds ratio 3.7, 95% CI 1.8 to 7.4), for a number needed to treat of 3.0. Overall ecopipam was well tolerated, without evidence of the motor or metabolic side effects common to D_{2} receptor antagonists.

Ecopipam is also being studied for the treatment of restless legs syndrome augmentation (phase 1/2). A small pilot study supported its potential utility for this use.

== Chemistry ==
Chemically, ecopipam is a synthetic benzazepine derivative. It can be synthesized from a simple tetralin derivative:

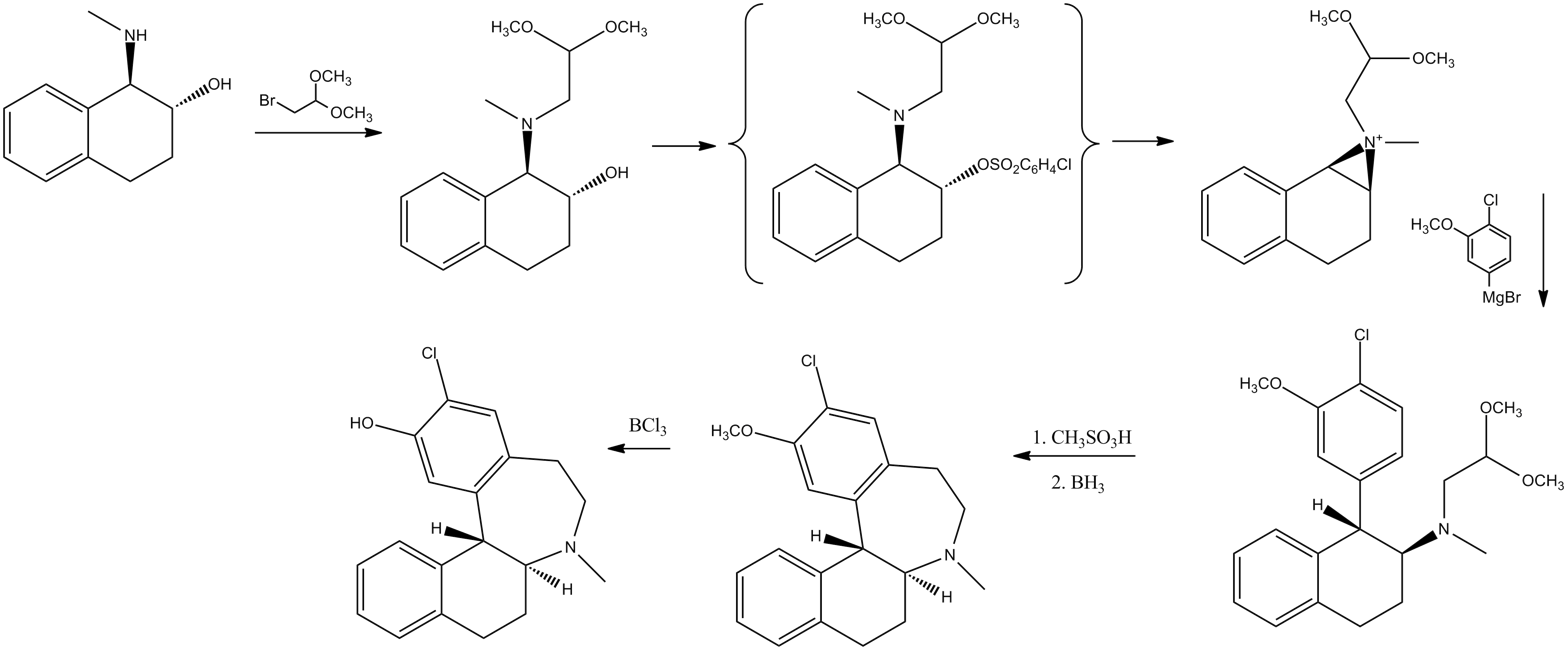

== See also ==
- List of investigational antipsychotics
- List of investigational Tourette's syndrome drugs
- Berupipam (NNC 22–0010)
- NNC 01-0687 (ADX-10061)
- Odapipam (NNC 01–0756)
- SCH-23390
