= SKF-83,959 =

Chemical compound

Identifiers
- IUPAC name: 6-chloro-7,8-dihydroxy-3-methyl-1-(3-methylphenyl)-2,3,4,5-tetrahydro-1H-3-benzazepine
- CAS Number: 67287-95-0
- PubChem CID: 11957685
- ChemSpider: 10131933
- UNII: 8CJ9F3C4Q0
- ChEBI: CHEBI:63996
- ChEMBL: ChEMBL520992

Chemical and physical data
- Formula: C_{18}H_{20}ClNO_{2}
- Molar mass: 317.81 g·mol^{−1}
- 3D model (JSmol): Interactive image
- SMILES: Br.Clc1c3c(cc(O)c1O)C(c2cccc(c2)C)CN(CC3)C
- InChI: InChI=1S/C18H20ClNO2.BrH/c1-11-4-3-5-12(8-11)15-10-20(2)7-6-13-14(15)9-16(21)18(22)17(13)19;/h3-5,8-9,15,21-22H,6-7,10H2,1-2H3;1H; Key:FHYWNBUFNGHNCP-UHFFFAOYSA-N

SKF-83,959, a synthetic benzazepine derivative used in scientific research, acts as an agonist at the D_{1}–D_{2} dopamine receptor heteromer. It behaves as a full agonist at the D_{1} protomer and a high-affinity partial agonist at the D_{2} protomer. It was further shown to act as an allosteric modulator of the sigma-1 receptor. SKF-83,959 additionally inhibits sodium channels as well as delayed rectifier potassium channels. SKF-83,959 is a racemate that consists of the R-(+)- and S-(−)-enantiomers MCL-202 and MCL-201, respectively.

SKF-83,959 was described as a SNDRI. The synthesis has been described.

== See also ==
- Substituted 3-benzazepine
