= Berupipam =

Abandoned D1 receptor antagonist

Clinical data
- Other names: NNC 22-0010; NNC-22-0010; NNC220010; NNC2210; NNC-2210
- Drug class: Dopamine D_{1} receptor antagonist

Identifiers
- IUPAC name: (5S)-5-(5-bromo-2,3-dihydro-1-benzofuran-7-yl)-8-chloro-3-methyl-1,2,4,5-tetrahydro-3-benzazepin-7-ol
- CAS Number: 150490-85-0
- PubChem CID: 66002
- ChemSpider: 59394
- UNII: 420895MAOC
- ChEMBL: ChEMBL2106005

Chemical and physical data
- Formula: C_{19}H_{19}BrClNO_{2}
- Molar mass: 408.72 g·mol^{−1}
- 3D model (JSmol): Interactive image
- SMILES: CN1CCC2=CC(=C(C=C2[C@H](C1)C3=CC(=CC4=C3OCC4)Br)O)Cl
- InChI: InChI=1S/C19H19BrClNO2/c1-22-4-2-11-7-17(21)18(23)9-14(11)16(10-22)15-8-13(20)6-12-3-5-24-19(12)15/h6-9,16,23H,2-5,10H2,1H3/t16-/m0/s1; Key:DIKLCFJDIZFAOM-INIZCTEOSA-N

Berupipam (INN; developmental code name NNC 22-0010) is a selective dopamine D_{1} receptor antagonist of the benzazepine group which was under development for the treatment of psychotic disorders but was never marketed. It reached phase 1 clinical trials prior to the discontinuation of its development.

Berupipam and closely related dopamine D_{1} receptor antagonists were reported to have been generally well-tolerated in clinical trials, but side effects included restlessness, drowsiness, other central nervous system-related symptoms, and orthostatic hypotension.

Berupipam, in radiolabeled form, has been studied for use in positron emission tomography (PET) imaging. The drug was first described in the scientific literature by 1994.

== See also ==
- Substituted 3-benzazepine
- List of investigational antipsychotics
- Ecopipam (SCH-39166)
- NNC 01-0687 (ADX-10061)
- Odapipam (NNC 01-0756)
- SCH-23390
