= Odapipam =

Abandoned D1 receptor antagonist

Clinical data
- Other names: NNC 01-0756; NNC-01-0756; NNC-010756; NNC010756; NNC01-0756; NNC-756; NNC756; NNC 0756; NNC0756; NO-756; NO756
- Drug class: Dopamine D_{1} receptor antagonist

Identifiers
- IUPAC name: (5S)-8-chloro-5-(2,3-dihydro-1-benzofuran-7-yl)-3-methyl-1,2,4,5-tetrahydro-3-benzazepin-7-ol
- CAS Number: 131796-63-9
- PubChem CID: 132421
- ChemSpider: 116932
- UNII: 847PQF7ZN6
- ChEMBL: ChEMBL2106649
- CompTox Dashboard (EPA): DTXSID50157210

Chemical and physical data
- Formula: C_{19}H_{20}ClNO_{2}
- Molar mass: 329.82 g·mol^{−1}
- 3D model (JSmol): Interactive image
- SMILES: CN1CCC2=CC(=C(C=C2[C@H](C1)C3=CC=CC4=C3OCC4)O)Cl
- InChI: InChI=1S/C19H20ClNO2/c1-21-7-5-13-9-17(20)18(22)10-15(13)16(11-21)14-4-2-3-12-6-8-23-19(12)14/h2-4,9-10,16,22H,5-8,11H2,1H3/t16-/m1/s1; Key:SKMVRXPBCSTNKE-MRXNPFEDSA-N

Odapipam (INN; developmental code names NNC 01-0756, NNC-756, NO-756) is a selective D_{1} receptor antagonist of the benzazepine group which was investigated as a potential antipsychotic but was never marketed.

It has more than 5,000-fold selectivity for the dopamine D_{1} receptor (K_{i} = 0.17 nM) over the dopamine D_{2} receptor (K_{i} = 942 nM). Its affinities for other dopamine receptors, such as the dopamine D_{5} receptor, were not reported. In addition to the dopamine D_{1} receptor, odapipam showed relatively high affinity for the serotonin 5-HT_{2} receptor (K_{i} = 4.5 nM; 26-fold lower than for the D_{1} receptor).

The drug was first described in the scientific literature by 1988.

== See also ==
- Substituted 3-benzazepine
- List of investigational antipsychotics
- Berupipam (NNC 22-0010)
- Ecopipam (SCH-39166)
- NNC 01-0687 (ADX-10061)
- SCH-23390
