= Dihydrexidine =

Chemical compound

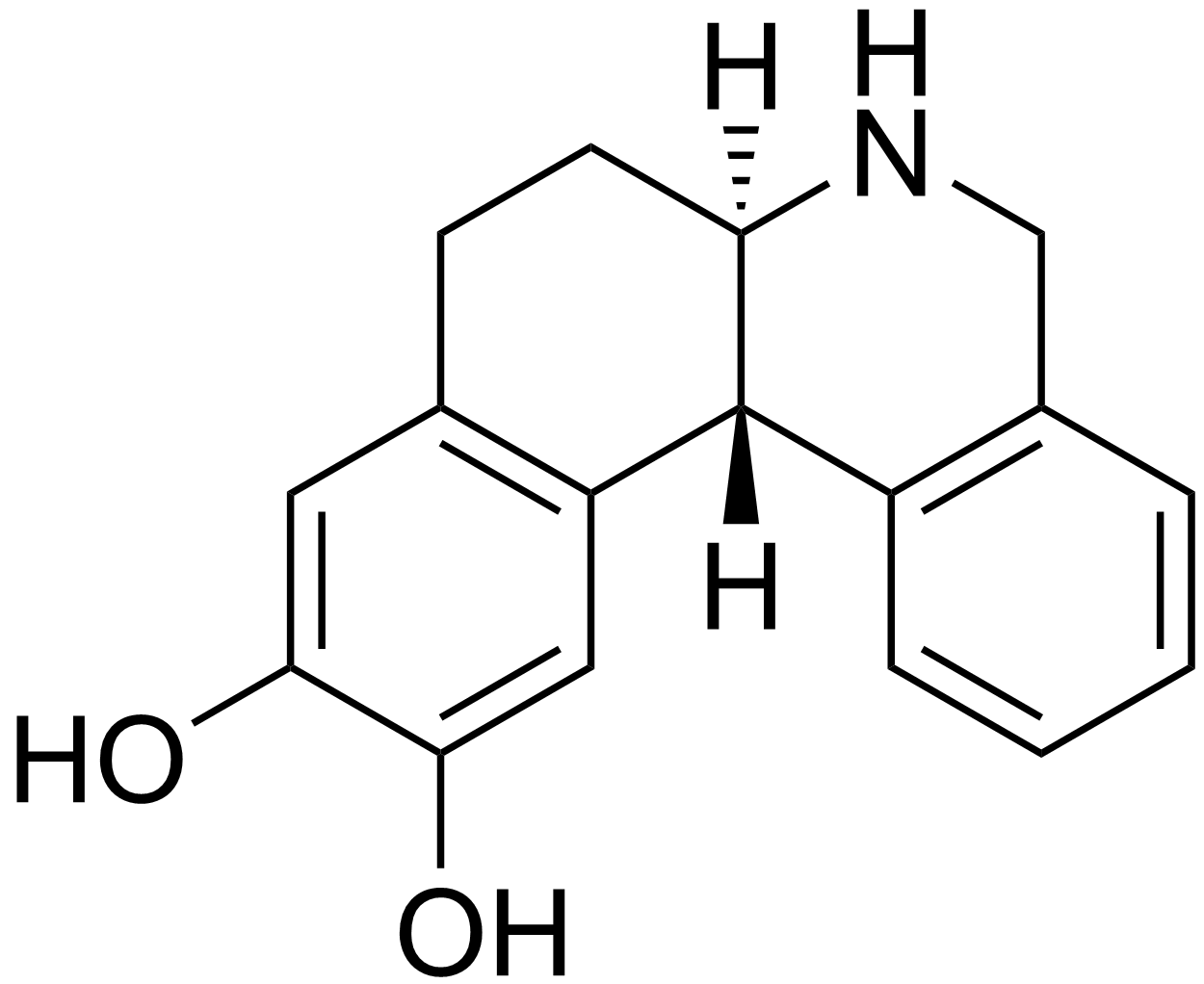

Clinical data
- Other names: IP-202; IP202; DAR-0100; DAR0100; DAR-100; DAR100
- Drug class: Dopamine receptor agonist; Dopamine D_{1}-like receptor agonist
- ATC code: None

Identifiers
- IUPAC name: 5,6,6a,7,8,12b-hexahydro-benzo(a)phenanthridine-10,11-diol
- CAS Number: 123039-93-0
- PubChem CID: 5311070
- ChemSpider: 5036130
- UNII: 32D64VH037
- ChEMBL: ChEMBL25856
- CompTox Dashboard (EPA): DTXSID00894188

Chemical and physical data
- Formula: C_{17}H_{17}NO_{2}
- Molar mass: 267.328 g·mol^{−1}
- 3D model (JSmol): Interactive image
- SMILES: c1ccc2c(c1)CN[C@H]3[C@H]2c4cc(c(cc4CC3)O)O
- InChI: InChI=1S/C17H17NO2/c19-15-7-10-5-6-14-17(13(10)8-16(15)20)12-4-2-1-3-11(12)9-18-14/h1-4,7-8,14,17-20H,5-6,9H2/t14-,17-/m1/s1; Key:BGOQGUHWXBGXJW-RHSMWYFYSA-N

Dihydrexidine (developmental code names IP-202 and DAR-0100) is a moderately selective full agonist at the dopamine D_{1} and D_{5} receptors. It has approximately 10-fold selectivity for D_{1} and D_{5} over the D_{2} receptor. Although dihydrexidine has some affinity for the D_{2} receptor, it has functionally selective (highly biased) actions on dopamine D_{2} receptor signaling, thereby explaining why it lacks dopamine D_{2} receptor agonist behavioral qualities.

Dihydrexidine has shown impressive antiparkinson effects in the MPTP-primate model, and has been investigated for the treatment of Parkinson's disease. In an early clinical trial the drug was given intravenously and led to profound hypotension so development was halted. The drug was resurrected when it was shown that smaller subcutaneous doses were safe. This led to a pilot study in schizophrenia and current clinical trials to assess its efficacy in improving the cognitive and working memory deficits in schizophrenia and schizotypal disorder.

There have been several reviews of relevance to the compound.

== See also ==
- List of investigational Parkinson's disease drugs
- Adrogolide (A-93431; ABT-431; DAS-431)
