= CY-208,243 =

Chemical compound

Clinical data
- Other names: CY 208-243; CY208243; CY-208243

Identifiers
- IUPAC name: 4,6,6a,7,8,12b-hexahydro-7-methylindolo(4,3-ab)-phenanthridine
- CAS Number: 100999-26-6
- PubChem CID: 58144
- ChemSpider: 52380
- UNII: 8GJ4UR780B
- CompTox Dashboard (EPA): DTXSID9042598

Chemical and physical data
- Formula: C_{19}H_{18}N_{2}
- Molar mass: 274.367 g·mol^{−1}
- 3D model (JSmol): Interactive image
- SMILES: c15c4[nH]cc5CC2C(c1ccc4)c3ccccc3CN2C
- InChI: InChI=1S/C19H18N2/c1-21-11-12-5-2-3-6-14(12)19-15-7-4-8-16-18(15)13(10-20-16)9-17(19)21/h2-8,10,17,19-20H,9,11H2,1H3/t17-,19-/m1/s1; Key:WRNKIDLXXXIELU-IEBWSBKVSA-N

CY-208,243, or CY 208-243, is a drug which acts as a dopamine agonist selective for the D_{1} subtype. Unlike most D_{1}-selective agonists, it shows efficacy in animal models of Parkinson's disease.

== See also ==
- Substituted ergoline
