= SKF-38,393 =

Chemical compound

Clinical data
- Other names: SKF-38,393; SKF38393; SK&F-38393; SK&F-38,393
- Drug class: Dopamine D_{1} receptor agonist; Stimulant
- ATC code: None

Identifiers
- IUPAC name: 1-phenyl-2,3,4,5-tetrahydro-1H-3-benzazepine-7,8-diol
- CAS Number: 67287-49-4
- PubChem CID: 1242
- IUPHAR/BPS: 935
- ChemSpider: 1205
- UNII: R7TF327S2C
- ChEBI: CHEBI:131793
- ChEMBL: ChEMBL24077
- CompTox Dashboard (EPA): DTXSID10894836

Chemical and physical data
- Formula: C_{16}H_{17}NO_{2}
- Molar mass: 255.317 g·mol^{−1}
- 3D model (JSmol): Interactive image
- SMILES: C1CNCC(C2=CC(=C(C=C21)O)O)C3=CC=CC=C3

SKF-38393 is a synthetic compound of the 3-benzazepine family which acts as a selective dopamine D_{1} and D_{5} receptor partial agonist. It has stimulant and anorectic effects.

The trimethylation of SKF-38,393 leads to a named agent called trepipam. As with fenoldopam, the inclusion of a chlorine halogen gave an agent that is called SKF-81,297.

== See also ==
- Substituted 3-benzazepine
- Cyclized phenethylamine
