= NNC 01-0687 =

Abandoned D1-like receptor antagonist

Clinical data
- Other names: ADX-10061; CEE 03-310; CEE-310; NNC 01-687; NNC-687; NO-687
- Drug class: Dopamine D_{1}-like receptor antagonist

Identifiers
- IUPAC name: (5S)-5-(2,3-dihydro-1-benzofuran-7-yl)-3-methyl-8-nitro-1,2,4,5-tetrahydro-3-benzazepin-7-ol
- CAS Number: 128022-68-4
- PubChem CID: 164252
- DrugBank: DB05419
- ChemSpider: 144027
- UNII: K389NU4SEV
- CompTox Dashboard (EPA): DTXSID80926057

Chemical and physical data
- Formula: C_{19}H_{20}N_{2}O_{4}
- Molar mass: 340.379 g·mol^{−1}
- 3D model (JSmol): Interactive image
- SMILES: CN1CCC2=CC(=C(C=C2[C@H](C1)C3=CC=CC4=C3OCC4)O)[N+](=O)[O-]
- InChI: InChI=1S/C19H20N2O4/c1-20-7-5-13-9-17(21(23)24)18(22)10-15(13)16(11-20)14-4-2-3-12-6-8-25-19(12)14/h2-4,9-10,16,22H,5-8,11H2,1H3/t16-/m1/s1; Key:XZPSYCOYKJRHKE-MRXNPFEDSA-N

NNC 01-0687 (also known as ADX-10061, CEE-03-310, or NNC-687) is a selective dopamine D_{1}-like receptor antagonist of the benzazepine group which was under development as an experimental antipsychotic for the treatment of schizophrenia but was never marketed. Its development for schizophrenia was discontinued due to lack of effectiveness in clinical trials.

Subsequently, NNC 01-0687 was developed under the code name ADX-10061 for treatment of substance dependence and was studied for smoking cessation, alcohol dependence, and cocaine dependence. It was also developed for treatment of sleep disorders. However, development for all of these indications was also discontinued, by 2007, and the drug was never marketed for any use.

The drug has been found to increase slow wave sleep (deep sleep) in humans.

NNC 01-0687 was first described in the scientific literature by 1992.

== See also ==
- Substituted 3-benzazepine
- List of investigational antipsychotics
- Berupipam (NNC 22-0010)
- Ecopipam (SCH-39166)
- Odapipam (NNC 01-0756)
- SCH-23390
