= 7-Chlorolorcaserin =

Clinical data
- Other names: 7-Cl-lorcaserin
- Drug class: Serotonin 5-HT_{2} receptor agonist; Serotonin 5-HT_{2A} receptor agonist
- ATC code: None

Identifiers
- IUPAC name: (1R)-7,8-dichloro-1-methyl-2,3,4,5-tetrahydro-1H-3-benzazepine
- CAS Number: 1006037-48-4
- PubChem CID: 24773649
- ChemSpider: 23309887
- ChEMBL: ChEMBL253591

Chemical and physical data
- Formula: C_{11}H_{13}Cl_{2}N
- Molar mass: 230.13 g·mol^{−1}
- 3D model (JSmol): Interactive image
- SMILES: C[C@H]1CNCCC2=CC(=C(C=C12)Cl)Cl
- InChI: InChI=1S/C11H13Cl2N/c1-7-6-14-3-2-8-4-10(12)11(13)5-9(7)8/h4-5,7,14H,2-3,6H2,1H3/t7-/m0/s1; Key:KTCVEIAEKPSBCJ-ZETCQYMHSA-N

7-Chlorolorcaserin, also known as (1R)-7,8-dichloro-1-methyl-2,3,4,5-tetrahydro-1H-3-benzazepine, is a serotonin 5-HT_{2} receptor agonist of the 3-benzazepine family related to the previously marketed appetite suppressant and anti-obesity drug lorcaserin (Belviq). It is specifically the 7-chloro derivative of lorcaserin. The drug is much more potent as a serotonin 5-HT_{2A} receptor agonist and much less selective for the serotonin 5-HT_{2C} receptor than lorcaserin. It was first described by 2005.

== Pharmacology ==
=== Pharmacodynamics ===
7-Chlorolorcaserin is a potent agonist of the serotonin 5-HT_{2A}, 5-HT_{2B}, and 5-HT_{2C} receptors. Its EC_{50} values were 10 nM at the serotonin 5-HT_{2A} receptor, 40 nM at the serotonin 5-HT_{2B} receptor, and 4.0 nM at the serotonin 5-HT_{2C} receptor. As such, the drug only showed about 2.5-fold selectivity for the serotonin 5-HT_{2C} receptor over the serotonin 5-HT_{2A} receptor. It was the most potent serotonin 5-HT_{2A} receptor agonist and among the most potent serotonin 5-HT_{2C} receptor agonists of a large series of evaluated 3-benzazepines. Compared to lorcaserin, 7-chlorolorcaserin was about 16-fold more potent as a serotonin 5-HT_{2A} receptor agonist and about twice as potent as a serotonin 5-HT_{2C} receptor agonist. Relatedly, it was much less selective for the serotonin 5-HT_{2C} receptor over the serotonin 5-HT_{2A} receptor in comparison to lorcaserin, which itself showed about 20-fold selectivity.

The drug was assessed in rodents and was found to produce appetite suppression similarly to but somewhat less potently than lorcaserin. In addition to appetite suppression, lorcaserin has been found to produce the head-twitch response, a behavioral proxy of psychedelic effects, in rodents. However, this occurs only when lorcaserin is administered in combination with a selective serotonin 5-HT_{2C} receptor antagonist such as SB-242084. As a presumable result of serotonin 5-HT_{2A} receptor activation, lorcaserin has likewise been found to produce hallucinogenic effects at several-fold supratherapeutic doses in humans. This resulted in lorcaserin being designated a Schedule IV controlled substance in the United States. Unlike lorcaserin, 7-chlorolorcaserin is not known to have been assessed in terms of psychedelic-related effects.

== Chemistry ==
7-Chlorolorcaserin, also known as (1R)-7,8-dichloro-1-methyl-2,3,4,5-tetrahydro-1H-3-benzazepine, is a substituted 3-benzazepine and the 7-chloro derivative of lorcaserin. Both lorcaserin and 7-chlorolorcaserin are cyclized phenethylamines and may be thought of as cyclized analogues of amphetamine appetite suppressants like para-chloroamphetamine, chlorphentermine, and fenfluramine.

7-Chlorolorcaserin is the (R)- enantiomer of a chiral compound and racemic mixture of (R)- and (S)- stereoisomers. The (S)- enantiomer and the racemic mixture are also potent serotonin 5-HT_{2} receptor agonists, but are less potent and more selective for the serotonin 5-HT_{2C} receptor than 7-chlorolorcaserin. Lorcaserin is an enantiopure (R)- enantiomer similarly to 7-chlorolorcaserin.

=== Synthesis ===
The chemical synthesis of 7-chlorolorcaserin has been described.

== History ==
7-Chlorolorcaserin was described in the scientific literature by a large team at Arena Pharmaceuticals by 2005. Lorcaserin was selected for development instead due to its profile being most optimal as an appetite suppressant and 7-chlorolorcaserin was not further investigated.

== See also ==
- Substituted 3-benzazepine
- List of miscellaneous 5-HT_{2A} receptor agonists
