= Doxanthrine =

Chemical compound

Clinical data
- ATC code: none

Identifiers
- IUPAC name: (6aS,12bR)-6a,7,8,12b-tetrahydro-6H-chromeno[3,4-c]isoquinoline-2,3-diol
- CAS Number: 916572-45-7
- PubChem CID: 15981509
- ChemSpider: 13112900
- ChEMBL: ChEMBL387250
- CompTox Dashboard (EPA): DTXSID401028617

Chemical and physical data
- Formula: C_{16}H_{15}NO_{3}
- Molar mass: 269.300 g·mol^{−1}
- 3D model (JSmol): Interactive image
- SMILES: c1ccc2c(c1)CN[C@H]3[C@H]2c4cc(c(cc4OC3)O)O
- InChI: InChI=1S/C16H15NO3/c18-13-5-11-15(6-14(13)19)20-8-12-16(11)10-4-2-1-3-9(10)7-17-12/h1-6,12,16-19H,7-8H2/t12-,16-/m1/s1; Key:QDUNOUQOKOYLCH-MLGOLLRUSA-N

Doxanthrine is a synthetic compound which is a potent and selective full agonist for the dopamine D_{1} receptor. Doxanthrine has been shown to be orally active in producing contralateral rotation in the 6-hydroxydopamine rat model of Parkinson's disease.
