= DETQ =

Clinical data
- Drug class: Dopamine D_{1} receptor positive allosteric modulator

Identifiers
- IUPAC name: 2-(2,6-dichlorophenyl)-1-[(1S,3R)-3-(hydroxymethyl)-5-(2-hydroxypropan-2-yl)-1-methyl-3,4-dihydro-1H-isoquinolin-2-yl]ethanone
- CAS Number: 1638667-81-8
- PubChem CID: 117720272
- ChemSpider: 58987054
- ChEMBL: ChEMBL3421730

Chemical and physical data
- Formula: C_{22}H_{25}Cl_{2}NO_{3}
- Molar mass: 422.35 g·mol^{−1}
- 3D model (JSmol): Interactive image
- SMILES: C[C@H]1C2=C(C[C@@H](N1C(=O)CC3=C(C=CC=C3Cl)Cl)CO)C(=CC=C2)C(C)(C)O
- InChI: InChI=1S/C22H25Cl2NO3/c1-13-15-6-4-7-18(22(2,3)28)16(15)10-14(12-26)25(13)21(27)11-17-19(23)8-5-9-20(17)24/h4-9,13-14,26,28H,10-12H2,1-3H3/t13-,14+/m0/s1; Key:CWRORBWPLQQFMX-UONOGXRCSA-N

DETQ is an experimental drug which acts as a positive allosteric modulator of the dopamine D_{1} receptor. It increases the D_{1} receptor-mediated response to endogenous dopamine levels, and was developed as a potential treatment for Parkinson's disease.

== Chemogenetic sensitivity tuning ==
A significant challenge in dopamine imaging is the detection of low-level tonic signals, which often fall below the affinity threshold of standard genetically encoded biosensors like dLight. Recent developments in chemogenetics have introduced a method to "tune" sensor sensitivity using DETQ, a potent and selective positive allosteric modulator (PAM) of the dopamine D1 receptor.

Because many dopamine sensors (such as dLight1.3b) are engineered using a human D1 receptor scaffold, DETQ can stabilize the receptor's active conformation when dopamine is bound. This results in a significant left-shift in the EC50 and up to an 8-fold increase in dopamine sensitivity (e.g., from 2 µM to 244 nM).

Crucially, DETQ exhibits a 30-fold lower affinity for rodent D1 receptors compared to the human-derived biosensor. This differential affinity allows researchers to temporarily "turn up the gain" on imaging signals in vivo without significantly altering the subject's endogenous behavior or physiology. This approach is particularly effective for resolving subtle, behavior-evoked phasic events and baseline tonic variations in brain regions with sparse dopaminergic innervation, such as the prefrontal cortex.

== See also ==
- Glovadalen
- Mevidalen
- ASP-4345
