= SCH-23390 =

Names
- IUPAC name 7-chloro-3-methyl-1-phenyl-1,2,4,5-tetrahydro-3-benzazepin-8-ol

Identifiers
CAS Number	87075-17-0
3D model (JSmol)	Interactive image; (+): Interactive image
ChEBI	CHEBI:73297; (+): CHEBI:92798
ChEMBL	(+): ChEMBL62
ChemSpider	4843; (+): 2300780
IUPHAR/BPS	943
PubChem CID	5018
UNII	UGT5535REQ
CompTox Dashboard (EPA)	DTXSID60873373 DTXSID40873376, DTXSID60873373
- InChI: InChI=1S/C17H18ClNO/c1-19-8-7-13-9-16(18)17(20)10-14(13)15(11-19)12-5-3-2-4-6-12/h2-6,9-10,15,20H,7-8,11H2,1H3 Key: GOTMKOSCLKVOGG-UHFFFAOYSA-N; (+): InChI=1S/C17H18ClNO/c1-19-8-7-13-9-16(18)17(20)10-14(13)15(11-19)12-5-3-2-4-6-12/h2-6,9-10,15,20H,7-8,11H2,1H3/t15-/m1/s1 Key: GOTMKOSCLKVOGG-OAHLLOKOSA-N
- SMILES: CN1CCC2=CC(=C(C=C2C(C1)C3=CC=CC=C3)O)Cl; (+): CN1CCC2=CC(=C(C=C2[C@H](C1)C3=CC=CC=C3)O)Cl

Properties
Chemical formula	C_{17}H_{18}ClNO
Molar mass	287.78 g/mol
- Except where otherwise noted, data are given for materials in their standard state (at 25 °C [77 °F], 100 kPa). verify (what is ?) Infobox references

SCH-23390, also known as halobenzazepine, is a synthetic compound that acts as a dopamine D_{1} receptor antagonist with either minimal or negligible effects on the D_{2} receptor.

In a 1990 study in rats SCH-23390 offered significant protection from death in dextroamphetamine overdose, without providing protection from death by methamphetamine overdose. The compound provided significant protection from cocaine overdose in rats only at the lowest dose tested in the measurement series. This suggested that dextroamphetamine and methamphetamine at high (lethal) doses have different mechanisms of toxicity in rats.

In addition to its actions as a dopamine D_{1} receptor antagonist, SCH-23390 has been found to act as a GIRK blocker.

== See also ==
- Substituted 3-benzazepine
- Berupipam (NNC 22-0010)
- Ecopipam (SCH-39166)
- NNC 01-0687 (ADX-10061)
- Odapipam (NNC 01-0756)
