= A-68930 =

- Stereo, Kekulé skeletal formula of A-68930

Names
- Preferred IUPAC name (1R,3S)-1-(Aminomethyl)-3-phenyl-3,4-dihydro-1H-2-benzopyran-5,6-diol

Identifiers
CAS Number	130465-45-1; 130465-39-3 (HCl)
3D model (JSmol)	Interactive image
ChEMBL	ChEMBL315468
ChemSpider	109076
IUPHAR/BPS	6077
MeSH	A+68930
PubChem CID	122324
UNII	B4NI77O5D4
CompTox Dashboard (EPA)	DTXSID70926748
- InChI: InChI=1S/C16H17NO3/c17-9-15-11-6-7-13(18)16(19)12(11)8-14(20-15)10-4-2-1-3-5-10/h1-7,14-15,18-19H,8-9,17H2/t14-,15-/m0/s1 Key: SUHGRZPINGKYNV-GJZGRUSLSA-N
- SMILES: Oc1c(O)ccc2c1C[C@H](O[C@H]2CN)c3ccccc3

Properties
Chemical formula	C_{16}H_{17}NO_{3}
Molar mass	271.316 g·mol^{−1}
log P	1.175
Acidity (pK_{a})	9.491
Basicity (pK_{b})	4.506
- Except where otherwise noted, data are given for materials in their standard state (at 25 °C [77 °F], 100 kPa). verify (what is ?) Infobox references

A-68930 is a synthetic compound that acts as a selective dopamine receptor D_{1} agonist. It is orally active and has antidepressant and anorectic effects in animals, producing wakefulness and tachycardia, but without stimulant effects, instead producing sedation. The difference in effects between A-68930 and other D_{1} agonists such as SKF-82958 may be due to their differing effects on the related D_{5} receptor.
