= COPG2 =

Protein-coding gene in humans

Identifiers
- Aliases: COPG2, 2-COP, gamma-2-COP, coatomer protein complex subunit gamma 2, COPI coat complex subunit gamma 2
- External IDs: OMIM: 604355; MGI: 1858683; GeneCards: COPG2

Gene location (Human)
Chr.	Chromosome 7 (human)
Band	7q32.2	Start	130,506,238 bp
Band	7q32.2	End	130,668,748 bp

Gene location (Mouse)
Chr.	Chromosome 6 (mouse)
Band	6|6 A3.3	Start	30,747,553 bp
Band	6|6 A3.3	End	30,873,729 bp
RNA expression pattern
Bgee	Human / Mouse (ortholog); Top expressed in: ganglionic eminence; ventricular zone; right adrenal gland; right adrenal cortex; left adrenal gland; left ovary; islet of Langerhans; left adrenal cortex; right testis; right ovary / Top expressed in: spermatocyte; zygote; transitional epithelium of urinary bladder; secondary oocyte; genital tubercle; tail of embryo; granulocyte; lateral hypothalamus; medial vestibular nucleus; ventromedial nucleus; More reference expression data
BioGPS	n/a
Gene ontology
Molecular function	structural molecule activity
Cellular component	cytoplasmic vesicle; Golgi membrane; transport vesicle; cytosol; membrane; membrane coat; cytoplasm; COPI vesicle coat; Golgi apparatus; COPI-coated vesicle membrane; endoplasmic reticulum membrane; endoplasmic reticulum; endoplasmic reticulum-Golgi intermediate compartment
Biological process	intracellular protein transport; vesicle-mediated transport; intra-Golgi vesicle-mediated transport; endoplasmic reticulum to Golgi vesicle-mediated transport; protein transport; retrograde vesicle-mediated transport, Golgi to endoplasmic reticulum; protein secretion; organelle transport along microtubule
Sources:Amigo / QuickGO
Orthologs
Databases	NCBI: entry; OMA: entry
Species	Human	Mouse
Entrez	26958	54160
Ensembl	ENSG00000158623	ENSMUSG00000025607
UniProt	Q9UBF2	Q9QXK3
RefSeq (mRNA)	NM_012133; NM_001290033	NM_017478
RefSeq (protein)	NP_001276962; NP_036265	NP_059506
Location (UCSC)	Chr 7: 130.51 – 130.67 Mb	Chr 6: 30.75 – 30.87 Mb
PubMed search
- Wikidata
View/Edit Human	View/Edit Mouse

Coatomer subunit gamma-2 is a protein that in humans is encoded by the COPG2 gene.

== Interactions ==
COPG2 has been shown to interact with Dopamine receptor D1 and COPB1.
