= A-77636 =

- Stereo, Kekulé skeletal formula of A-77636

Names
- Preferred IUPAC name (1R,3S)-3-(Adamantan-1-yl)-1-(aminomethyl)-1H-2-benzopyran-5,6-diol

Identifiers
CAS Number	778546-51-3; 145307-34-2 (HCl)
3D model (JSmol)	Interactive image
ChEMBL	ChEMBL313530
ChemSpider	5036017
PubChem CID	6603703; 9951033 (HCl)
UNII	8PDA66H6ZI; WA6RGP1J4W (HCl)
CompTox Dashboard (EPA)	DTXSID1043887
- InChI: InChI=1S/C20H27NO3/c21-10-17-14-1-2-16(22)19(23)15(14)6-18(24-17)20-7-11-3-12(8-20)5-13(4-11)9-20/h1-2,11-13,17-18,22-23H,3-10,21H2/t11?,12?,13?,17-,18-,20?/m0/s1 Key: QLJOSZATCBCBDR-DFKUFRTHSA-N; InChI=1/C20H27NO3/c21-10-17-14-1-2-16(22)19(23)15(14)6-18(24-17)20-7-11-3-12(8-20)5-13(4-11)9-20/h1-2,11-13,17-18,22-23H,3-10,21H2/t11?,12?,13?,17-,18-,20?/m0/s1 Key: QLJOSZATCBCBDR-DFKUFRTHBM
- SMILES: Oc1ccc2c(c1O)C[C@H](O[C@H]2CN)C35CC4CC(C3)CC(C4)C5

Properties
Chemical formula	C_{20}H_{27}NO_{3}
Molar mass	329.440 g·mol^{−1}
- Except where otherwise noted, data are given for materials in their standard state (at 25 °C [77 °F], 100 kPa). verify (what is ?) Infobox references

A-77636 is a synthetic drug which acts as a selective D_{1} receptor full agonist. It has nootropic, anorectic, rewarding and antiparkinsonian effects in animal studies, but its high potency and long duration of action causes D_{1} receptor downregulation and tachyphylaxis, and unlike other D_{1} full agonists such as SKF-82,958, it does not produce place preference in animals. A-77636 partially substituted for cocaine in animal studies, and has been suggested for use as a possible substitute drug in treating addiction, but it is better known for its use in studying the role of D_{1} receptors in the brain.

== See also ==
- List of investigational Parkinson's disease drugs
