= Trepipam =

Chemical compound

Clinical data
- Other names: SCH-12679; SCH12679

Identifiers
- IUPAC name: (5R)-7,8-dimethoxy-3-methyl-5-phenyl-1,2,4,5-tetrahydro-3-benzazepine
- CAS Number: 56030-50-3
- PubChem CID: 91277
- ChemSpider: 4849
- UNII: 8LMO6J899I

Chemical and physical data
- Formula: C_{19}H_{23}NO_{2}
- Molar mass: 297.398 g·mol^{−1}
- 3D model (JSmol): Interactive image
- Specific rotation: +31.8°
- Density: 1.072 ± 0.06 g/cm^{3} (predicted)
- Melting point: 105–106 °C (221–223 °F) (experimental)
- Boiling point: 416.8 ± 45.0 °C (782.2 ± 81.0 °F) (predicted)
- SMILES: CN1CCC2=CC(=C(C=C2C(C1)C3=CC=CC=C3)OC)OC
- InChI: InChI=1S/C19H23NO2/c1-20-10-9-15-11-18(21-2)19(22-3)12-16(15)17(13-20)14-7-5-4-6-8-14/h4-8,11-12,17H,9-10,13H2,1-3H3/t17-/m1/s1; Key:ICPHJSKVAZMKIV-QGZVFWFLSA-N

Trepipam (INN; developmental code name SCH-12679) is a dopamine receptor agonist of the benzazepine group that was never marketed. It acts specifically as an agonist of the dopamine D_{1} receptor. It is closed related structurally to fenoldopam, a peripherally acting selective D_{1} receptor partial agonist which is used as an antihypertensive agent.

== See also ==
- Substituted 3-benzazepine
