= DNAJC14 =

Protein-coding gene in the species Homo sapiens

Identifiers
- Aliases: DNAJC14, DNAJ, DRIP78, HDJ3, LIP6, DnaJ heat shock protein family (Hsp40) member C14
- External IDs: OMIM: 606092; MGI: 1921580; GeneCards: DNAJC14

Gene location (Human)
| Chr. | Chromosome 12 (human) |
| Band | 12q13.2 | Start | 55,820,960 bp |
| Band | 12q13.2 | End | 55,830,824 bp |

Gene location (Mouse)
| Chr. | Chromosome 10 (mouse) |
| Band | 10|10 D3 | Start | 128,639,931 bp |
| Band | 10|10 D3 | End | 128,655,315 bp |
RNA expression pattern
| Bgee | Human / Mouse (ortholog); Top expressed in: islet of Langerhans; mucosa of ileum; stromal cell of endometrium; granulocyte; smooth muscle tissue; monocyte; tibialis anterior muscle; appendix; rectum; prefrontal cortex / Top expressed in: lacrimal gland; primary oocyte; secondary oocyte; granulocyte; right lung lobe; external carotid artery; internal carotid artery; lip; zygote; tail of embryo; More reference expression data |
| BioGPS | n/a |
Gene ontology
| Molecular function | G protein-coupled receptor binding; dopamine receptor binding |
| Cellular component | integral component of membrane; endoplasmic reticulum membrane; membrane; extracellular exosome; endoplasmic reticulum |
| Biological process | protein transport; transport |
Sources:Amigo / QuickGO
Orthologs
| Databases | NCBI: entry; OMA: entry |
| Species | Human | Mouse |
| Entrez | 85406 | 74330 |
| Ensembl | ENSG00000135392 | ENSMUSG00000025354 |
| UniProt | Q6Y2X3 | Q921R4 |
| RefSeq (mRNA) | NM_032364 | NM_028873; NM_001359824; NM_001359825 |
| RefSeq (protein) | NP_115740 | NP_083149; NP_001346753; NP_001346754 |
| Location (UCSC) | Chr 12: 55.82 – 55.83 Mb | Chr 10: 128.64 – 128.66 Mb |
| PubMed search |
- Wikidata
| View/Edit Human | View/Edit Mouse |

DnaJ homolog subfamily C member 14 is a protein that in humans is encoded by the DNAJC14 gene.

== Interactions ==
DNAJC14 has been shown to interact with Dopamine receptor D1.
