= D1–D2 dopamine receptor heteromer =

Receptor heteromer

Dopamine receptor D1

Identifiers
- Symbol: DRD1
- NCBI gene: 1812
- HGNC: 3020
- OMIM: 126449
- RefSeq: NP_000785
- UniProt: P21728

Other data
- Locus: Chr. 5 q35.2
Search for
- Structures: Swiss-model
- Domains: InterPro

Dopamine receptor D2

Identifiers
- Symbol: DRD2
- NCBI gene: 1813
- HGNC: 3023
- OMIM: 126450
- RefSeq: NP_000786
- UniProt: P14416

Other data
- Locus: Chr. 11 q22
Search for
- Structures: Swiss-model
- Domains: InterPro

The D_{1}–D_{2} dopamine receptor heteromer is a receptor heteromer consisting of D_{1} and D_{2} protomers.

== Structure ==
D_{1} and D_{2} receptors interact primarily through discrete amino acids in the cytoplasmic regions of each receptor, with no involvement of transmembrane parts. The intracellular loop 3 of the D_{2} receptor contains two adjacent arginine residues, while the carboxyl tail of the D_{1} receptor possesses two adjacent glutamic acid residues. The two receptors can form a heteromer complex via a salt bridge between the guanidine moiety and the carboxylic group.

== Signal transduction ==
The signalling of the D_{1}–D_{2} receptor heteromer is distinct from that of the parent receptor monomers. It comprises G_{q/11} coupling, phospholipase C activation, intracellular calcium release from inositol trisphosphate receptor-sensitive stores, CaMKII activation and BDNF production. In comparison, signalling of the homologous D_{5}–D_{2} receptor heteromer involves the influx of extracellular calcium.

== Physiology ==
The D_{1}–D_{2} receptor is upregulated in individuals with major depression, and especially the ratio D_{1}–D_{2} to D_{1} receptor is markedly shifted towards the heteromer. Counteracting this upregulation decreases depressive symptoms. Disruption of the heteromer can be achieved either directly by ligands interacting with the cytoplasmic interface, less directly by ligands that target the extracellular binding site, or indirectly as a downstream effect of classical antidepressant treatment. One study found negative results regarding a shift from Gs/a coupling to Gq/11 signaling; so such dynamics could be mediated by cAMP-dependent cascades rather from phospholipase C regulation.

Chronic THC increased the number of D1-D2 heteromer-expressing neurons, and the number of heteromers within individual neurons in adult monkey striatum.

== Ligands ==
- SKF-83,959
