= GPCR oligomer =

Class of protein complexes

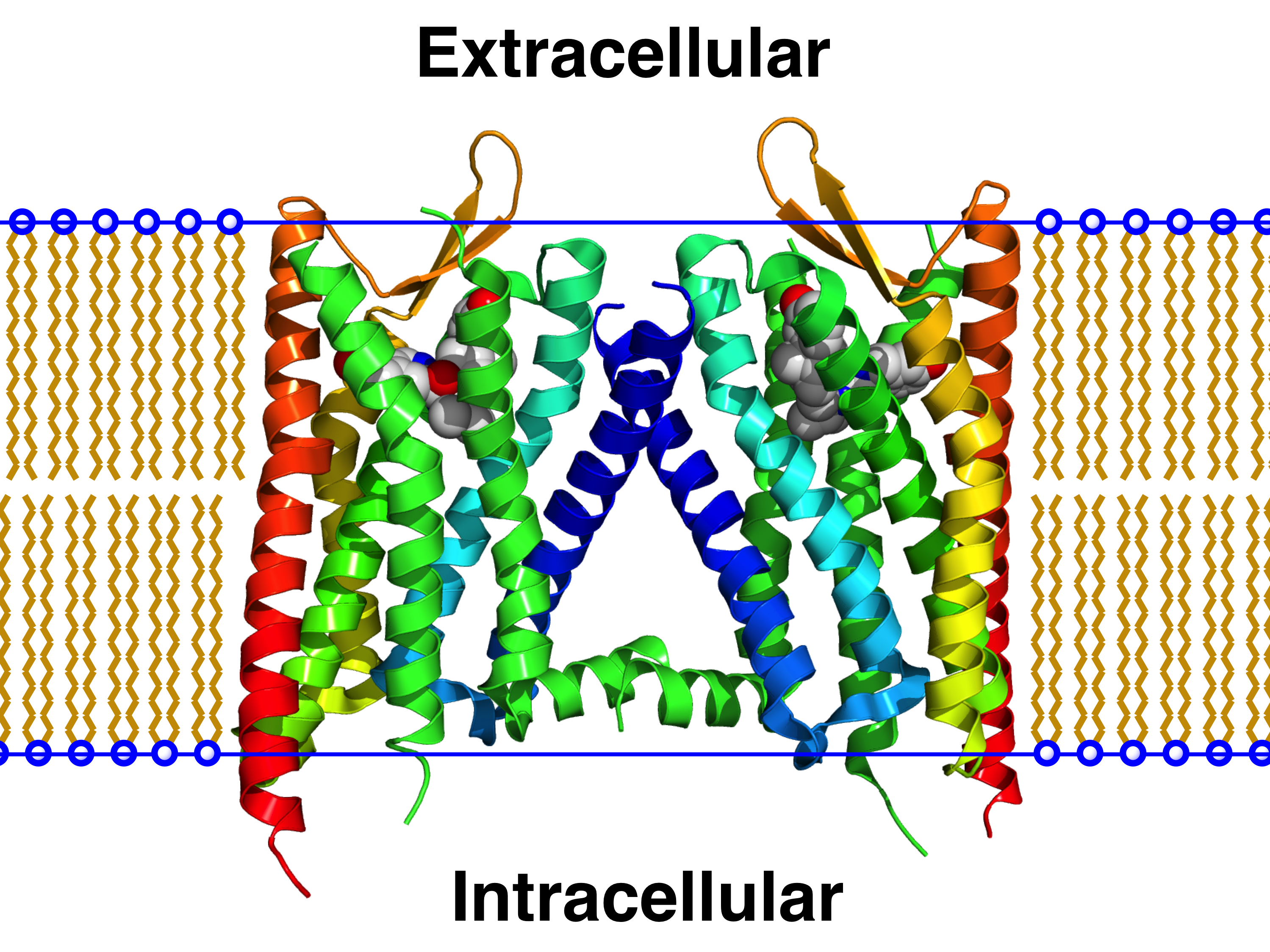
Crystallographic structure of the human κ-opioid receptor homo dimer (4djh) imbedded in a cartoon representation of a lipid bilayer. Each protomer is individually rainbow colored (N-terminus = blue, C-terminus = red). The receptor is complexed with the ligand JDTic that is depicted as a space-filling model (carbon = white, oxygen = red, nitrogen = blue).

A GPCR oligomer is a protein complex that consists of a small number (ὀλίγοι oligoi "a few", μέρος méros "part, piece, component") of G protein-coupled receptors (GPCRs). It is held together by covalent bonds or by intermolecular forces. The subunits within this complex are called protomers, while unconnected receptors are called monomers. Receptor homomers consist of identical protomers, while heteromers consist of different protomers.

Receptor homodimers – which consist of two identical GPCRs – are the simplest homomeric GPCR oligomers. Receptor heterodimers – which consist of two different GPCRs – are the simplest heteromeric GPCR oligomers.

The existence of receptor oligomers is a general phenomenon, whose discovery has superseded the prevailing paradigmatic concept of the function of receptors as plain monomers, and has far-reaching implications for the understanding of neurobiological diseases as well as for the development of drugs.

== Discovery ==
For a long time it was assumed that receptors transmitted their effects exclusively from their basic functional forms – as monomers. The first clue to the existence of GPCR oligomers goes back to 1975 when Robert Lefkowitz observed that β-adrenoceptors display negative binding cooperativity. At the beginning of the 1980s, it was hypothesized, receptors could form larger complexes, the so-called mosaic form, where two receptors may interact directly with each other. Mass determination of β-adrenoceptors (1982) and muscarinic receptors (1983), supported the existence of homodimer or tetrameric complexes. In 1991, the phenomenon of receptor crosstalk was observed between adenosine A_{2A} (A2A) and dopamine D_{2} receptor (DRD2) thus suggesting the formation of heteromers. While initially thought to be a receptor heterodimer, a review from 2015 determined that the A2A-DRD2 heteromer is a heterotetramer composed of A2A and DRD2 homodimers (i.e., two adenosine A2A receptors and two dopamine D2 receptors). Maggio and co-workers showed in 1993 the ability of the muscarinic M_{3} receptor and α2C-adrenoceptor to heterodimerize. The first direct evidence that GPCRs functioned as oligomers in vivo came from Overton and Blumer in 2000 by fluorescence resonance energy transfer (FRET) analysis of the α-factor receptor in the yeast Saccharomyces cerevisiae. In 2005, further evidence was provided that receptor oligomerization plays a functional role in a living organism with regulatory implication. The crystal structure of the CXCR4 dimer was published in 2010.

== Consequences of oligomerization ==
GPCR oligomers consist of receptor dimers, trimers, tetramers, and complexes of higher order. These oligomers are entities with properties that can differ from those of the monomers in several ways. The functional character of a receptor is dependent on its tertiary or quaternary structure. Within the complex protomers act as allosteric modulators of another. This has consequences for:

- the supply of the cell surface with receptors
- the ligand binding at corresponding binding sites
- the G-protein coupling
- the GPCR-mediated signal transduction
- modifying the desensitization profile
- the tendency for endocytosis and internalization
- the post-endocytotic fate of the receptors

== Detection ==
There are various methods to detect and observe GPCR oligomers.

== See also ==
- D_{1}-D_{2} dopamine receptor
