= Dopamine receptor D1 =

Protein-coding gene in humans

DRD1

Identifiers
- Aliases: DRD1, dopamine receptor D1, DADR, DRD1A
- External IDs: OMIM: 126449; MGI: 99578; GeneCards: DRD1
Available structures
PDB	Ortholog search: PDBe RCSB
PDB	List of PDB id codes 1OZ5

Gene location (Human)
Chr.	Chromosome 5 (human)
Band	5q35.2	Start	175,440,036 bp
Band	5q35.2	End	175,444,182 bp

Gene location (Mouse)
Chr.	Chromosome 13 (mouse)
Band	13 B1|13 28.4 cM	Start	54,205,202 bp
Band	13 B1|13 28.4 cM	End	54,209,724 bp
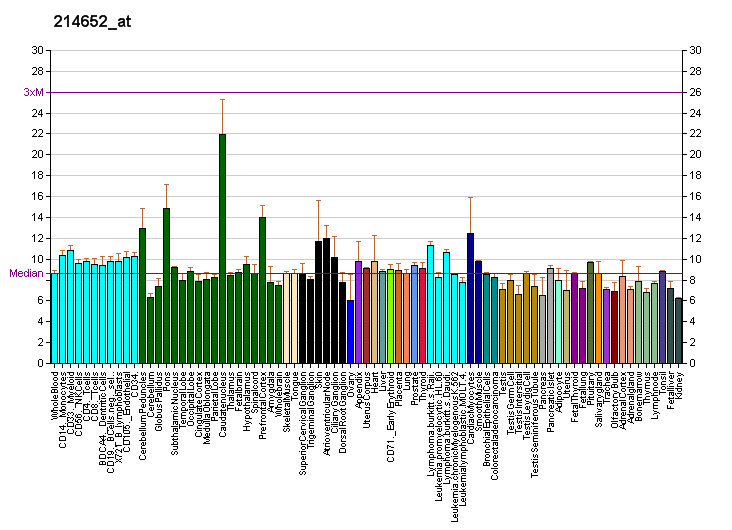
RNA expression pattern
Bgee	Human / Mouse (ortholog); Top expressed in: caudate nucleus; nucleus accumbens; putamen; gonad; prefrontal cortex; Brodmann area 9; cingulate gyrus; anterior cingulate cortex; right frontal lobe; Brodmann area 46 / Top expressed in: nucleus accumbens; dorsal striatum; olfactory tubercle; globus pallidus; superior frontal gyrus; temporal lobe; amygdala; neural layer of retina; urethra; lumbar subsegment of spinal cord; More reference expression data
BioGPS	More reference expression data
Gene ontology
Molecular function	dopamine neurotransmitter receptor activity; dopamine binding; protein binding; dopamine neurotransmitter receptor activity, coupled via Gs; G protein-coupled receptor activity; signal transducer activity; G-protein alpha-subunit binding
Cellular component	membrane; nucleus; endoplasmic reticulum; integral component of membrane; plasma membrane; endoplasmic reticulum membrane; integral component of plasma membrane; ciliary membrane; endomembrane system; non-motile cilium; glutamatergic synapse; GABA-ergic synapse; integral component of postsynaptic membrane; integral component of presynaptic membrane; dendritic spine; dendrite; cell projection; cilium
Biological process	positive regulation of cytosolic calcium ion concentration involved in phospholipase C-activating G protein-coupled signaling pathway; muscle contraction; protein import into nucleus; positive regulation of potassium ion transport; response to amphetamine; learning; feeding behavior; long-term depression; temperature homeostasis; striatum development; prepulse inhibition; response to cocaine; grooming behavior; behavioral response to cocaine; locomotory behavior; dentate gyrus development; transmission of nerve impulse; memory; positive regulation of synaptic transmission, glutamatergic; synapse assembly; habituation; adult walking behavior; peristalsis; cellular response to catecholamine stimulus; adenylate cyclase-activating dopamine receptor signaling pathway; regulation of dopamine uptake involved in synaptic transmission; associative learning; astrocyte development; G protein-coupled receptor signaling pathway, coupled to cyclic nucleotide second messenger; positive regulation of release of sequestered calcium ion into cytosol; mating behavior; behavioral fear response; activation of adenylate cyclase activity; dopamine receptor signaling pathway; conditioned taste aversion; cerebral cortex GABAergic interneuron migration; glucose import; visual learning; sensitization; positive regulation of cell migration; operant conditioning; vasodilation; regulation of dopamine metabolic process; dopamine metabolic process; phospholipase C-activating dopamine receptor signaling pathway; maternal behavior; dopamine transport; hippocampus development; neuronal action potential; long-term potentiation; signal transduction; synaptic transmission, dopaminergic; positive regulation of gene expression; cellular response to dopamine; regulation of protein phosphorylation; G protein-coupled receptor signaling pathway; adenylate cyclase-activating G protein-coupled receptor signaling pathway; regulation of synaptic vesicle exocytosis
Sources:Amigo / QuickGO
Orthologs
Databases	NCBI: entry; OMA: entry
Species	Human	Mouse
Entrez	1812	13488
Ensembl	ENSG00000184845	ENSMUSG00000021478
UniProt	P21728	Q61616
RefSeq (mRNA)	NM_000794	NM_001291801; NM_010076
RefSeq (protein)	NP_000785	NP_001278730; NP_034206
Location (UCSC)	Chr 5: 175.44 – 175.44 Mb	Chr 13: 54.21 – 54.21 Mb
PubMed search
- Wikidata
View/Edit Human	View/Edit Mouse

Dopamine receptor D_{1}, also known as DRD1, is one of the two types of D_{1}-like receptor family—receptors D_{1} and D_{5}. It is a protein that in humans is encoded by the DRD1 gene.

== Tissue distribution ==
D_{1} receptors are the most abundant kind of dopamine receptor in the central nervous system.

Northern blot and in situ hybridization show that the mRNA expression of DRD1 is highest in the dorsal striatum (caudate and putamen) and ventral striatum (nucleus accumbens and olfactory tubercle).

Lower levels occur in the basolateral amygdala, cerebral cortex, septum, thalamus, and hypothalamus.

The DRD1 gene is expressed primarily in the caudate putamen in humans, and in the caudate putamen, the nucleus accumbens, and the olfactory tubercle in mice.

== Structure ==
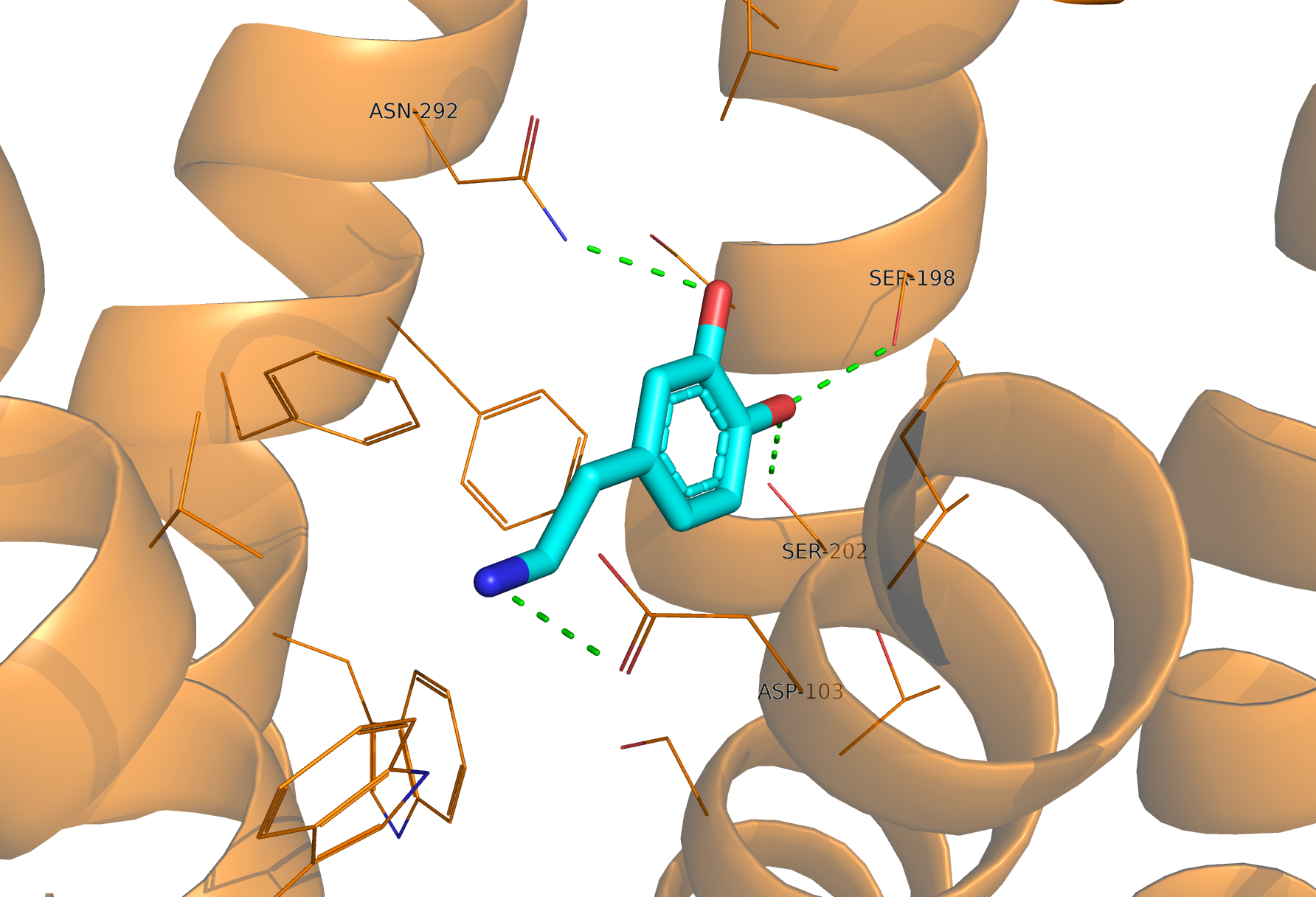
Dopamine D1 structure in complex with dopamine, receptor in orange, dopamine in cyan, interactions are in green.

The dopamine receptor D1 (D1R) is a Gs-coupled GPCR characterized by a canonical seven-transmembrane (TM) helical domain, with a ligand-binding pocket located extracellularly and a cytoplasmic G-protein interaction interface. Cryo-EM and X-ray crystallography studies reveal that agonist binding induces conformational changes, including outward movement of TM6 and extension of TM5 by two helical turns, facilitating engagement with the Gαs subunit.

Agonist interact with extracellular loop 2 and extracellular regions of trans-membrane helices 2, 3, 6, and 7. Interactions between catechol-based agonists and three trans-membrane serine residues including S198^{5.42}, S199^{5.43}, and S202^{5.46} function as microswitches that are essential for receptor activation.

The ligand-binding pocket accommodates both catechol (e.g., dopamine, SKF81297) and non-catechol agonists, with selectivity influenced by residues like V317^{7.39} and W321^{7.43} in TM7, which form hydrophobic interactions rather than the polar contacts seen in β2-adrenergic receptors. Non-catechol agonists bind in an extended conformation, spanning the orthosteric site to extracellular loop 2 (ECL2), leveraging unique pocket topology for D1R specificity. Structural comparisons with D2R highlight divergent cytoplasmic features—D1R's elongated TM5 and larger Gs interface (~1,520 Å^{2}) contrast with D2R's Gi-selective coupling, underpinning functional specificity. These insights provide templates for designing selective therapeutics targeting dopaminergic pathways.

== Function ==
D_{1} receptors regulate the memory, learning, and the growth of neurons, also is used in the reward system and locomotor activity, mediating some behaviors and modulating dopamine receptor D_{2}-mediated events.

They play a role in addiction by facilitating the gene expression changes that occur in the nucleus accumbens during addiction.

They are Gs coupled and can stimulate neurons by activation of cyclic AMP-dependent protein kinase.

== Ligands ==
There are a number of ligands selective for the D_{1} receptors. To date, most of the known ligands are based on dihydrexidine or the prototypical benzazepine partial agonist SKF-38393 (one derivative being the prototypical antagonist SCH-23390). D_{1} receptor has a high degree of structural homology to another dopamine receptor, D_{5}, and they both bind similar drugs. As a result, none of the known orthosteric ligands is selective for the D_{1} vs. the D_{5} receptor, but the benzazepines generally are more selective for the D_{1} and D_{5} receptors versus the D_{2}-like family. Some of the benzazepines have high intrinsic activity whereas others do not. In 2015 the first positive allosteric modulator for the human D_{1} receptor was discovered by high-throughput screening.

=== Agonists ===
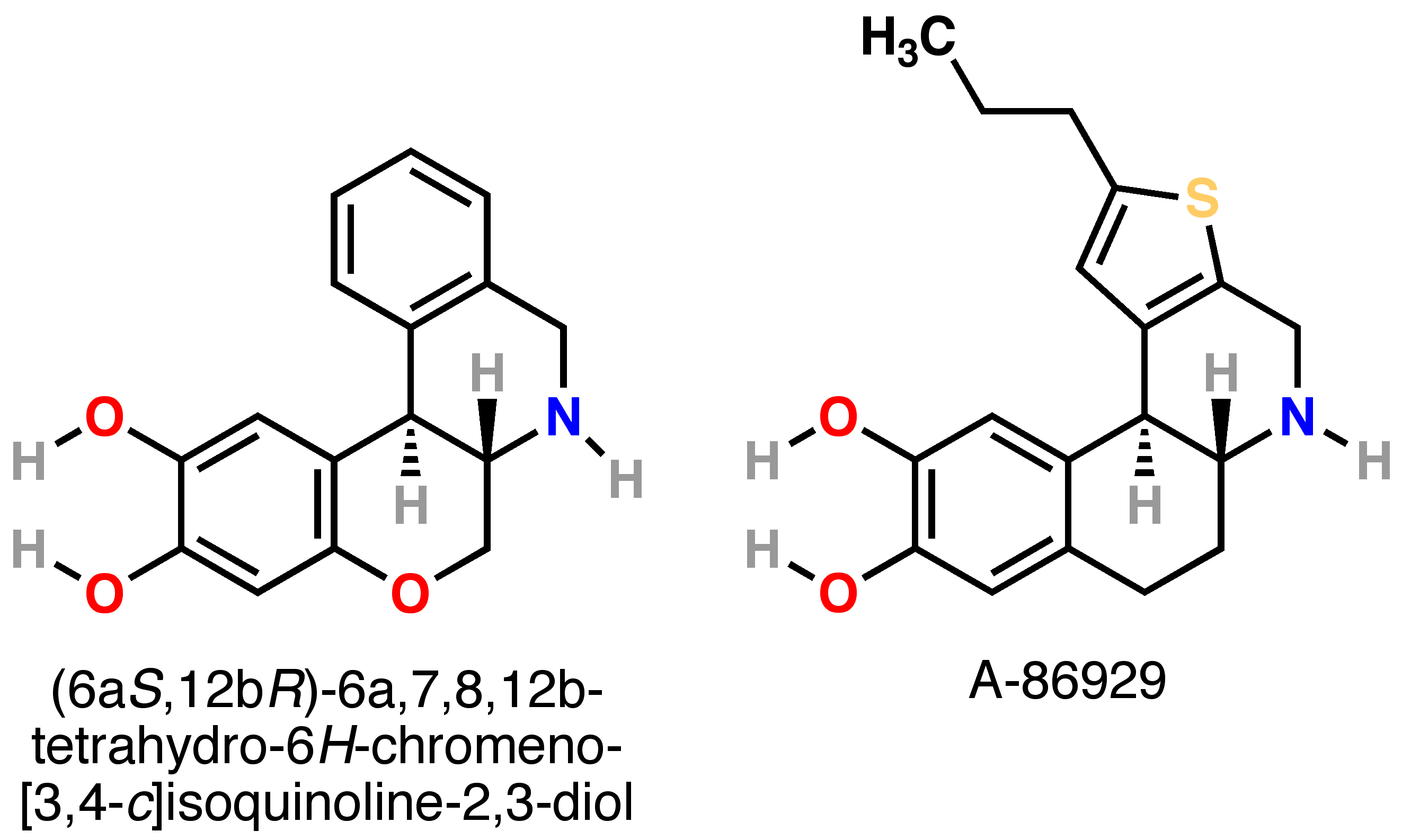
Chemical structures of selective D_{1} receptor agonists

Several D_{1} receptor agonists are used clinically. These include apomorphine, pergolide, rotigotine, and terguride. All of these drugs are preferentially D_{2}-like receptor agonists. Fenoldopam is a selective D_{1} receptor partial agonist that does not cross the blood-brain-barrier and is used intravenously in the treatment of hypertension. Dihydrexidine and adrogolide (ABT-431) (a prodrug of A-86929 with improved bioavailability) are the only selective, centrally active D_{1}-like receptor agonists that have been studied clinically in humans. The selective D_{1} agonists give profound antiparkinson effects in humans and primate models of PD, and yield cognitive enhancement in many preclinical models and a few clinical trials. The most dose-limiting feature is profound hypotension, but the clinical development was impeded largely by lack of oral bioavailability and short duration of action. In 2017, Pfizer made public information about pharmaceutically-acceptable non-catechol selective D_{1} agonists that are in clinical development.

==== List of D_{1} receptor agonists ====
- Dihydrexidine derivatives
  - A-86929 – full agonist with 14-fold selectivity for D_{1}-like receptors over D_{2}
  - Dihydrexidine – full agonist with 10-fold selectivity for D_{1}-like receptors over D_{2} that has been in Phase IIa clinical trials as a cognitive enhancer. It also showed profound antiparkinson effects in MPTP-treated primates, but caused profound hypotension in one early clinical trial in Parkinson's disease. Although dihydrexidine has significant D_{2} properties, it is highly biased at D_{1} receptors and was used for the first demonstration of functional selectivity with dopamine receptors.
  - Dinapsoline – full agonist with 5-fold selectivity for D_{1}-like receptors over D_{2}
  - Dinoxyline – full agonist with approximately equal affinity for D_{1}-like and D_{2} receptors
  - Doxanthrine – full agonist with 168-fold selectivity for D_{1}-like receptors over D_{2}
- Benzazepine derivatives
  - SKF-81297 – 200-fold selectivity for D_{1} over any other receptor
  - SKF-82958 – 57-fold selectivity for D_{1} over D_{2}
  - SKF-38393 – very high selectivity for D_{1} with negligible affinity for any other receptor
  - Clozapine – partial agonist at D_{1}-like receptors
  - Fenoldopam – highly selective peripheral D_{1} receptor partial agonist used clinically as an antihypertensive
  - 6-Br-APB – 90-fold selectivity for D_{1} over D_{2}
  - Trepipam (SCH-12679)
- Others
  - Stepholidine – alkaloid with D_{1} agonist and D_{2} antagonist properties, showing antipsychotic effects
  - A-68930
  - A-77636
  - CY-208,243 – high intrinsic activity partial agonist with moderate selectivity for D_{1}-like over D_{2}-like receptors, member of ergoline ligand family like pergolide and bromocriptine
  - PF-06412562 (CVL-562)
  - SKF-89145
  - SKF-89626
  - 7,8-Dihydroxy-5-phenyl-octahydrobenzo[h]isoquinoline – extremely potent, high-affinity full agonist
  - Cabergoline – weak D_{1} agonism, highly selective for D_{2}, and various serotonin receptors
  - Pergolide – (similar to cabergoline) weak D_{1} agonism, highly selective for D_{2}, and various serotonin receptors
  - A photoswitchable agonist of D_{1}-like receptors (azodopa) has been described that allows reversible control of dopaminergic transmission in wildtype animals.
  - Razpipadon (CVL-871, PF-06669571)
  - Tavapadon (CVL-751, PF-06649751)

=== Positive allosteric modulators ===
- DETQ – PAM
- Glovadalen (UCB-0022) – selective PAM, in phase 2 studies for Parkinson's disease
- Mevidalen (LY-3154207) – potent and subtype selective PAM, in phase 2 studies for Lewy body dementia. Shows selectivity for D_{1} receptors over D_{5}.

=== Antagonists ===
Many typical and atypical antipsychotics are D_{1} receptor antagonists in addition to D_{2} receptor antagonists. But asenapine has shown stronger D_{1} receptor affinity compared to other antipsychotics. No other D_{1} receptor antagonists have been approved for clinical use. Ecopipam is a selective D_{1}-like receptor antagonist that has been studied clinically in humans in the treatment of a variety of conditions, including schizophrenia, cocaine abuse, obesity, pathological gambling, and Tourette's syndrome, with efficacy in some of these conditions seen. The drug produced mild-to-moderate, reversible depression and anxiety in clinical studies however and has yet to complete development for any indication.

==== List of D_{1} receptor antagonists ====
- Berupipam (NNC 22-0010)
- Ecopipam (SCH-39,166) – a selective D_{1}/D_{5} antagonist that was being developed as an anti-obesity medication but was discontinued However, it has showed promise in reducing stuttering and is currently in Phase 2 Trials for this purpose
- NNC 01-0687 (ADX-10061)
- Odapipam (NNC 01-0756)
- SCH-23,390 – 100-fold selectivity for D_{1} over D_{5}

== Protein–protein interactions ==
Dopamine receptor D_{1} has been shown to interact with:

- COPG2
- COPG
- DNAJC14

=== Receptor oligomers ===
The D_{1} receptor forms heteromers with the following receptors: dopamine D_{2} receptor, dopamine D_{3} receptor, histamine H_{3} receptor, μ opioid receptor, NMDA receptor, and adenosine A_{1} receptor.

- D_{1}–D_{2} receptor complex
- D_{1}−H_{3}−NMDAR receptor complex – a target to prevent neurodegeneration
- D_{1}–D3 receptor complex
- D_{1}–NMDAR receptor complex
- D_{1}–A_{1} receptor complex

== See also ==
- Dopamine receptor
