= Cerevel Therapeutics =

American biotechnology company

Cerevel Therapeutics Holdings, Inc.
- Company type: Subsidiary
- Traded as: Nasdaq: CERE
- Industry: Biopharmaceuticals
- Founded: 2018; 7 years ago
- Fate: Acquired by AbbVie
- Headquarters: Cambridge, Massachusetts, U.S.
- Number of employees: 355 (2024)
- Parent: Abbvie
- Website: cerevel.com

Cerevel Therapeutics Holdings, Inc. was an American biotechnology and pharmaceuticals company based in Cambridge, Massachusetts, focused on the development of novel therapies for mental and neurological illnesses.

== History ==
Cerevel was established in October 2018. The company was formed in a collaboration between pharmaceuticals company Pfizer and private equity firm Bain Capital.

In 2019, Cerevel appointed N. Anthony Coles as its chief executive officer. In 2020, Coles led Cerevel's effort to raise $445 million for brain drugs, the third largest biotech public listing at that time (after Legend Biotech and Moderna). In May 2023, Coles resigned from his position as CEO, yet retained his role as board chairman of Cerevel.

In December 2023, American pharmaceutical company AbbVie announced its intention to acquire Cerevel for US$8.7 billion. The acquisition was completed in August 2024 with Cerevel becoming a subsidiary of Abbvie.

== Pipeline ==
Cerevel uses novel approaches and technologies to develop its drugs and treatment therapies. Its pipeline contains an array of drugs and therapies treating a range of conditions including Schizophrenia, Parkinson's, Epilepsy, mood disorders, and more.

Notable Cerevel drugs and treatments at varying stages of development include:

- Tavapadon (Parkinson's)
- Emraclidine (Schizophrenia, Alzheimer's)
- Darigabat (Epilepsy)
- CVL-871 (Dementia, Apathy)
- CVL-354 (Major depressive and Substance-related disorders)

== Approach to treatment ==
Cerevel's tagline mission statement is to "unravel the mysteries of the brain" to treat neurological disease. Scientifically, its approach to therapy development focuses on understanding the wiring of the brain, pursuing novel targets, and addressing specific receptor sub-types.

The company has stated its approach to neurotherapy development can be viewed as:

- Development of treatment opportunities by precisely identifying and targeting the neurocircuitry that underlies a given neurological disease.
- Selective targeting of only the relevant receptor subtype(s) related to the physiology of the disease being treated. This has the impact of minimizing undesired off-target and side effects, while maximizing activity.
- The design of full and partial agonists, antagonists and allosteric modulators that can precisely fine-tune the receptor pharmacology and neurocircuit activity, without over-activation or over-suppression of the endogenous physiologic range.
