= Tolserine =

AChE inhibitor derived from Phenserine

2-Methyl Phenserine

Names
- IUPAC name [(3aR,8bS)-3,4,8b-Trimethyl-2,3a-dihydro-1H-pyrrolo[2,3-b]indol-7-yl] N-(2-methylphenyl)carbamate
- Other names 2-Methylphenserine

Identifiers
| 3D model (JSmol) | Interactive image |
| ChEMBL | ChEMBL130458 |
| ChemSpider | 8104030 |
| PubChem CID | 9928397 |
- InChI: InChI=1S/C21H25N3O2/c1-14-7-5-6-8-17(14)22-20(25)26-15-9-10-18-16(13-15)21(2)11-12-23(3)19(21)24(18)4/h5-10,13,19H,11-12H2,1-4H3,(H,22,25)/t19-,21+/m1/s1 Key: JGAGHIIOCADQOV-CTNGQTDRSA-N
- SMILES: CC1=CC=CC=C1NC(=O)OC2=CC3=C(C=C2)N([C@@H]4[C@]3(CCN4C)C)C

Properties
| Chemical formula | C_{21}H_{25}N_{3}O_{2} |
| Molar mass | 351.450 g·mol^{−1} |
- Except where otherwise noted, data are given for materials in their standard state (at 25 °C [77 °F], 100 kPa). Infobox references

Tolserine (2-methylphenserine) is an inhibitor of acetylcholinesterase. It has been described as of potential interest for the treatment of myasthenia gravis (MG) and Alzheimer's disease.

== Chemistry ==
Tolserine is a substituted derivative of phenserine. Additionally, certain analogs of tolserine possess less selectivity between different cholinesterase enzymes.

== Biological activity ==
As an inhibitor of the AChE enzyme, tolserine slows the breakdown of acetylcholine, a neurotransmitter. Tests have described tolserine as having an average IC_{50} value of 8.13 nM and an estimated K_{i} of 4.69 nM, which represents a more potent inhibition than its parent compound phenserine.
