= Lorcaserin =

Anti-obesity drug

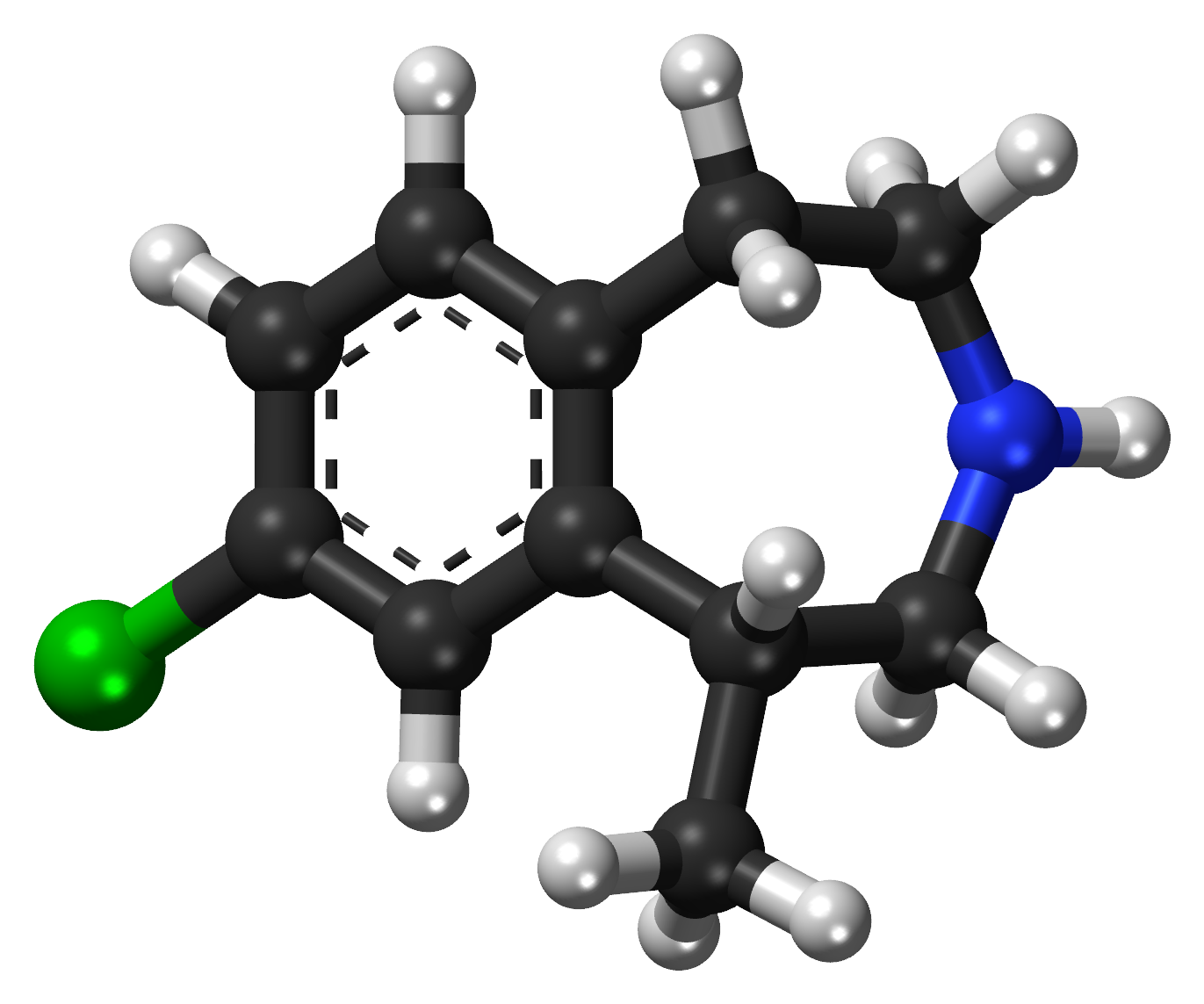

Clinical data
- Trade names: Belviq
- Other names: APD-356
- AHFS/Drugs.com: Monograph
- MedlinePlus: a613014
- License data: US DailyMed: Lorcaserin; US FDA: Lorcaserin
- Routes of administration: Oral
- Drug class: Serotonin 5-HT_{2C} receptor agonist
- ATC code: A08AA11 (WHO)

Legal status
- Legal status: US: Schedule IV / Withdrawn

Pharmacokinetic data
- Protein binding: 70%
- Metabolism: Hepatic (extensive)
- Elimination half-life: 11 hours
- Excretion: Renal (92.3%), Faecal (2.2%)

Identifiers
- IUPAC name: (1R)-8-chloro-1-methyl-2,3,4,5-tetrahydro-1H-3-benzazepine
- CAS Number: 616202-92-7
- PubChem CID: 11658860
- IUPHAR/BPS: 2941
- DrugBank: DB04871
- ChemSpider: 9833595
- UNII: 637E494O0Z
- ChEBI: CHEBI:65353
- ChEMBL: ChEMBL360328
- CompTox Dashboard (EPA): DTXSID3048659
- ECHA InfoCard: 100.237.138

Chemical and physical data
- Formula: C_{11}H_{14}ClN
- Molar mass: 195.69 g·mol^{−1}
- 3D model (JSmol): Interactive image
- SMILES: CC1CNCCC2=C1C=C(C=C2)Cl
- InChI: InChI=1S/C11H14ClN/c1-8-7-13-5-4-9-2-3-10(12)6-11(8)9/h2-3,6,8,13H,4-5,7H2,1H3/t8-/m0/s1; Key:XTTZERNUQAFMOF-QMMMGPOBSA-N

Lorcaserin, sold under the brand name Belviq, is a weight-loss drug that was developed by Arena Pharmaceuticals. It reduces appetite by activating the 5-HT_{2C} serotonin receptor in the hypothalamus, a region of the brain which is known to control appetite. It was approved in 2012, and in 2020 was removed from the market in the United States due to an increased risk of cancer detected in users of Belviq.

== Medical uses ==
Lorcaserin was used long term for weight loss in those who are obese.

The safety and efficacy of Belviq were evaluated in three randomized, placebo-controlled trials that included nearly 8,000 obese and overweight patients, with and without type 2 diabetes, treated for 52 to 104 weeks. All participants received lifestyle modification that consisted of a reduced calorie diet and exercise counseling. Compared with placebo, treatment with Belviq for up to one year was associated with average weight loss ranging from 3–3.7%.

About 47% of patients without type 2 diabetes lost at least 5% of their body weight compared with about 23% of patients treated with placebo. In people with type 2 diabetes, about 38% of patients treated with Belviq and 16% treated with placebo lost at least 5% of their body weight. Belviq treatment was associated with favorable changes in glycemic control in those with type 2 diabetes. The approved labeling for Belviq recommends that the drug be discontinued in patients who fail to lose 5% of their body weight after 12 weeks of treatment, as these patients are unlikely to achieve clinically meaningful weight loss with continued treatment.

The drug's manufacturer was required to conduct six postmarketing studies, including a long-term cardiovascular outcomes trial to assess the effect of Belviq on the risk for major adverse cardiac events such as heart attack and stroke.

== Side effects ==
There had been concern that lorcaserin could cause cardiac valvulopathy based upon the reports of subjects taking the drug in Phase 2 trials. However, a 2016 Phase 3 clinical trial found no statistically significant differences in valvulopathy rates compared to control, being 2.4% for the drug subjects and 2.0% for controls, and concluded that the drug was safe for the target population although more long-term data was needed.

FDA required a post-marketing cardiovascular safety trial as a condition of lorcaserin's approval (a requirement for all weight management drugs since the withdrawal of sibutramine in 2010 due to cardiovascular harm). The CAMELLIA-TIMI 61 trial was conducted for this purpose, and it showed no difference in rates of major adverse cardiovascular events ("MACE+", a composite of "cardiovascular death, myocardial infarction, stroke, hospitalization for unstable angina, heart failure, or any coronary revascularization") between lorcaserin and placebo. However secondary analysis of CAMELLIA-TIMI 61 by FDA showed a likely higher cancer risk in those taking lorcaserin. The trial was conducted in approximately 12,000 participants over five years and more patients taking lorcaserin were diagnosed with cancer compared to patients taking placebo. CAMELLIA-TIMI 61 was powered to detect differences in MACE, but was not adequately powered to detect differences in cancer rates over the five-year study period.

In February 2020, the FDA requested that the manufacturer of lorcaserin voluntarily withdraw the drug from the US market because a safety clinical trial showed an increased occurrence of cancer. The drug manufacturer, Eisai, voluntarily withdrew the drug.

== Overdose ==
Lorcaserin can produce hallucinogenic effects and other side effects with overdose. This can occur with single doses that are only 2- to 6-fold the usual single therapeutic dose. The effects are thought to be serotonergic psychedelic effects and are believed to be mediated by activation of the serotonin 5-HT_{2A} receptor.

== Pharmacology ==
=== Pharmacodynamics ===
Lorcaserin activities
Receptor	EC_{50} (nM)	K_{i} (nM)
5-HT_{2C}	39	13
5-HT_{2B}	2380	147
5-HT_{2A}	553	92

Lorcaserin is a selective 5-HT_{2C} receptor agonist, and in vitro testing of the drug showed reasonable selectivity for 5-HT_{2C} over other related targets. 5-HT_{2C} receptors are located almost exclusively in the brain, and can be found in the choroid plexus, cortex, hippocampus, cerebellum, amygdala, thalamus, and hypothalamus. The activation of 5-HT_{2C} receptors in the hypothalamus is supposed to activate proopiomelanocortin (POMC) production and consequently promote weight loss through satiety. This hypothesis is supported by clinical trials and other studies. While it is generally thought that 5-HT_{2C} receptors help to regulate appetite as well as mood, and endocrine secretion, the exact mechanism of appetite regulation was not known as of 2005. Lorcaserin has shown 100x selectivity for 5-HT_{2C} versus the closely related 5-HT_{2B} receptor, and 17x selectivity over the 5-HT_{2A} receptor.

=== Pharmacokinetics ===
The elimination half-life of lorcaserin is approximately 11 to 12 hours.

== Chemistry ==
Lorcaserin is a substituted 3-benzazepine derivative. The chemical structure of lorcaserin is similar to that of para-chloroamphetamine (PCA). It is also similar to that of 7-AB.

== History ==
=== Approval history ===
On 22 December 2009, a New Drug Application (NDA) was submitted to the Food and Drug Administration (FDA) in the United States.

On 16 September 2010, an FDA advisory panel voted 9–5 against approval of the drug based on concerns over both efficacy and safety, particularly the findings of mammary gland tumors of female rats. On 23 October 2010, the FDA decided not to approve the drug based on the available data. This was not only because cancer promoting properties could not be ruled out, but also because the weight loss efficacy was considered "marginal".

On 10 May 2012, after a new round of studies submitted by Arena, an FDA panel voted to recommend lorcaserin with certain restrictions and patient monitoring. The restrictions include patients with a BMI of over 30, or with a BMI over 27 and a comorbidity such as high blood pressure or type 2 diabetes.

On 27 June 2012, the FDA approved lorcaserin for use in adults with a body mass index (BMI) of 30 or greater (obese), or adults with a BMI of 27 or greater (overweight) and who had at least one weight-related condition such as high blood pressure (hypertension), type 2 diabetes, or high cholesterol (dyslipidemia).

On 15 July 2016, the FDA approved the extended release version of lorcaserin for weight management with once-daily dosing instead of twice daily dosing.

On 17 September 2020, the FDA withdrew approval for lorcaserin and for extended-release lorcaserin tablets.

== Society and culture ==
=== Legal status ===
==== Canada ====
Lorcaserin is not a controlled substance in Canada.

==== United States ====
In December 2012, the US Drug Enforcement Administration proposed classifying lorcaserin as a Schedule IV drug because it has hallucinogenic properties at higher than approved doses and users hypothetically might develop psychiatric dependencies on the drug. On 7 May 2013, the US Drug Enforcement Administration classified lorcaserin as a Schedule IV drug under the Controlled Substances Act.

== Research ==
=== Epilepsy ===
Lorcaserin is under development for the treatment of Dravet syndrome, Lennox–Gastaut syndrome, and other forms of epilepsy. As of 2024 and 2025, it is in phase 3 clinical trials for Dravet syndrome and the preclinical research stage of development for Lennox–Gastaut syndrome. It is being developed by Eisai and Epygenix, including under the developmental code name EPX-200. Though lorcaserin is or was under development by Eisai for Dravet syndrome, this development is said to have been discontinued in late 2024.

== See also ==
- Substituted 3-benzazepine
- Serotonin 5-HT_{2C} receptor agonist
- 7-Chlorolorcaserin
