= Fenoldopam =

Antihypertensive agent

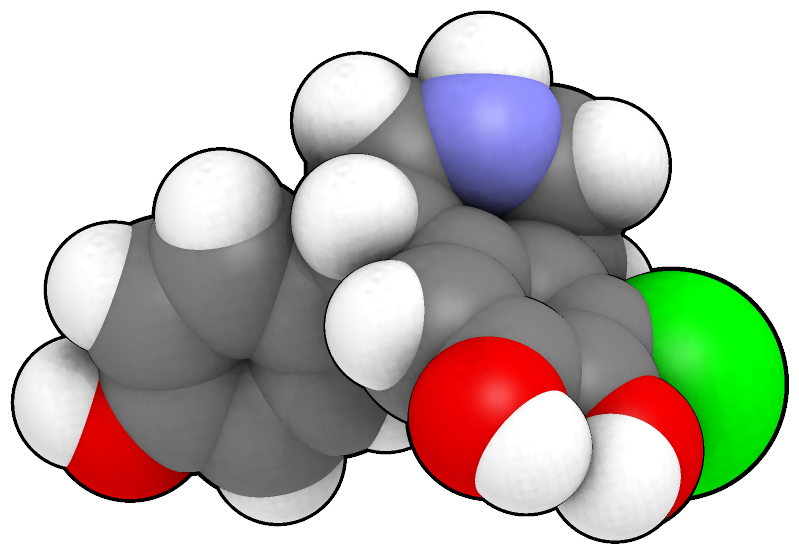

Clinical data
- Trade names: Corlopam
- AHFS/Drugs.com: Monograph
- Routes of administration: Intravenous
- ATC code: C01CA19 (WHO)

Legal status
- Legal status: US: ℞-only

Pharmacokinetic data
- Metabolism: Hepatic (CYP not involved)
- Elimination half-life: 5 minutes
- Excretion: Renal (90%) and fecal (10%)

Identifiers
- IUPAC name: (RS)-6-chloro-1-(4-hydroxyphenyl)-2,3,4,5-tetrahydro-1H-3-benzazepine-7,8-diol
- CAS Number: 67227-56-9
- PubChem CID: 3341
- IUPHAR/BPS: 939
- DrugBank: DB00800
- ChemSpider: 3224
- UNII: INU8H2KAWG
- KEGG: D07946
- ChEBI: CHEBI:5002
- ChEMBL: ChEMBL588
- CompTox Dashboard (EPA): DTXSID0043896

Chemical and physical data
- Formula: C_{16}H_{16}ClNO_{3}
- Molar mass: 305.76 g·mol^{−1}
- 3D model (JSmol): Interactive image
- Chirality: Racemic mixture
- SMILES: Clc1c3c(cc(O)c1O)C(c2ccc(O)cc2)CNCC3
- InChI: InChI=1S/C16H16ClNO3/c17-15-11-5-6-18-8-13(9-1-3-10(19)4-2-9)12(11)7-14(20)16(15)21/h1-4,7,13,18-21H,5-6,8H2; Key:TVURRHSHRRELCG-UHFFFAOYSA-N

Fenoldopam mesylate, sometimes referred to as simply fenoldopam, and sold as a generic drug and previously under the brand name Corlopam, is a drug and synthetic benzazepine derivative acting as a selective D_{1} receptor partial agonist. Fenoldopam is sometimes used as a short-term antihypertensive agent. It had been approved under the patent drug name Corlopam by the US Food and Drug Administration (FDA) in September 1997. The brand name Corlopam and the generic versions of fenoldopam mesylate were discontinued in the United States in August 2022 and no longer available by 2023.

== Medical uses ==
Fenoldopam is used as an antihypertensive agent postoperatively, and also intravenously to treat a hypertensive crisis. Since fenoldopam is an intravenous agent with minimal adrenergic effects that improves renal perfusion, in theory it could be beneficial in hypertensive patients with concomitant chronic kidney disease. It can cause reflex tachycardia, but it is dependent on the infusion of the drug.

== Contraindications ==
Fenoldopam mesylate contains sodium metabisulfite, a sulfite that may rarely cause allergic-type reactions including anaphylactic symptoms and asthma in susceptible people. Fenoldopam mesylate administration should be undertaken with caution to patients with glaucoma or raised intraocular pressure as fenoldopam raises intraocular pressure. Concomitant use of fenoldopam with a beta blocker should be avoided if possible, as unexpected hypotension can result from beta-blocker inhibition of sympathetic-mediated reflex tachycardia in response to fenoldopam.

== Adverse effects ==
Adverse effects include headache, flushing, nausea, hypotension, reflex tachycardia, and increased intraocular pressure.

== Pharmacology ==
Fenoldopam causes arterial/arteriolar vasodilation leading to a decrease in blood pressure by activating peripheral D_{1} receptors. It decreases afterload and also promotes sodium excretion via specific dopamine receptors along the nephron. The renal effect of fenoldopam and dopamine may involve physiological antagonism of the renin-angiotensin system in the kidney. In contrast to dopamine, fenoldopam is a selective D_{1} receptor agonist with no effect on beta adrenoceptors, although there is evidence that it may have some alpha-1 and alpha-2 adrenoceptor antagonist activity. D_{1} receptor stimulation activates adenylyl cyclase and raises intracellular cyclic AMP, resulting in vasodilation of most arterial beds, including renal, mesenteric, and coronary arteries. to cause a reduction in systemic vascular resistance. Fenoldopam has a rapid onset of action (4 minutes) and short duration of action (< 10 minutes) and a linear dose–response relationship at usual clinical doses.

== See also ==
- Substituted 3-benzazepine
