= GSK-189254 =

Chemical compound

Identifiers
- IUPAC name: 6-[(3-cyclobutyl-1,2,4,5-tetrahydro-3-benzazepin-7-yl)oxy]-N-methylpyridine-3-carboxamide
- CAS Number: 720690-73-3
- PubChem CID: 9798547
- ChemSpider: 7974313
- UNII: 5T4TX6CO53
- ChEMBL: ChEMBL517140
- CompTox Dashboard (EPA): DTXSID801005982

Chemical and physical data
- Formula: C_{21}H_{25}N_{3}O_{2}
- Molar mass: 351.450 g·mol^{−1}
- 3D model (JSmol): Interactive image
- SMILES: c4cc1CCN(C3CCC3)CCc1cc4Oc(cc2)ncc2C(=O)NC
- InChI: InChI=1S/C21H25N3O2/c1-22-21(25)17-6-8-20(23-14-17)26-19-7-5-15-9-11-24(18-3-2-4-18)12-10-16(15)13-19/h5-8,13-14,18H,2-4,9-12H2,1H3,(H,22,25); Key:WROHEWWOCPRMIA-UHFFFAOYSA-N

GSK-189,254 is a potent and selective H_{3} histamine receptor inverse agonist developed by GlaxoSmithKline. It has subnanomolar affinity for the H_{3} receptor (K_{i} = 0.2nM) and selectivity of over 10,000x for H_{3} over other histamine receptor subtypes. Animal studies have shown it to possess not only stimulant and nootropic effects, but also analgesic action suggesting a role for H_{3} receptors in pain processing in the spinal cord. GSK-189,254 and several other related drugs are currently being investigated as a treatment for Alzheimer's disease and other forms of dementia, as well as possible use in the treatment of conditions such as narcolepsy, or neuropathic pain which do not respond well to conventional analgesic drugs.

== See also ==
- Substituted 3-benzazepine
- List of investigational narcolepsy and hypersomnia drugs
