= 6-Br-APB =

Chemical compound

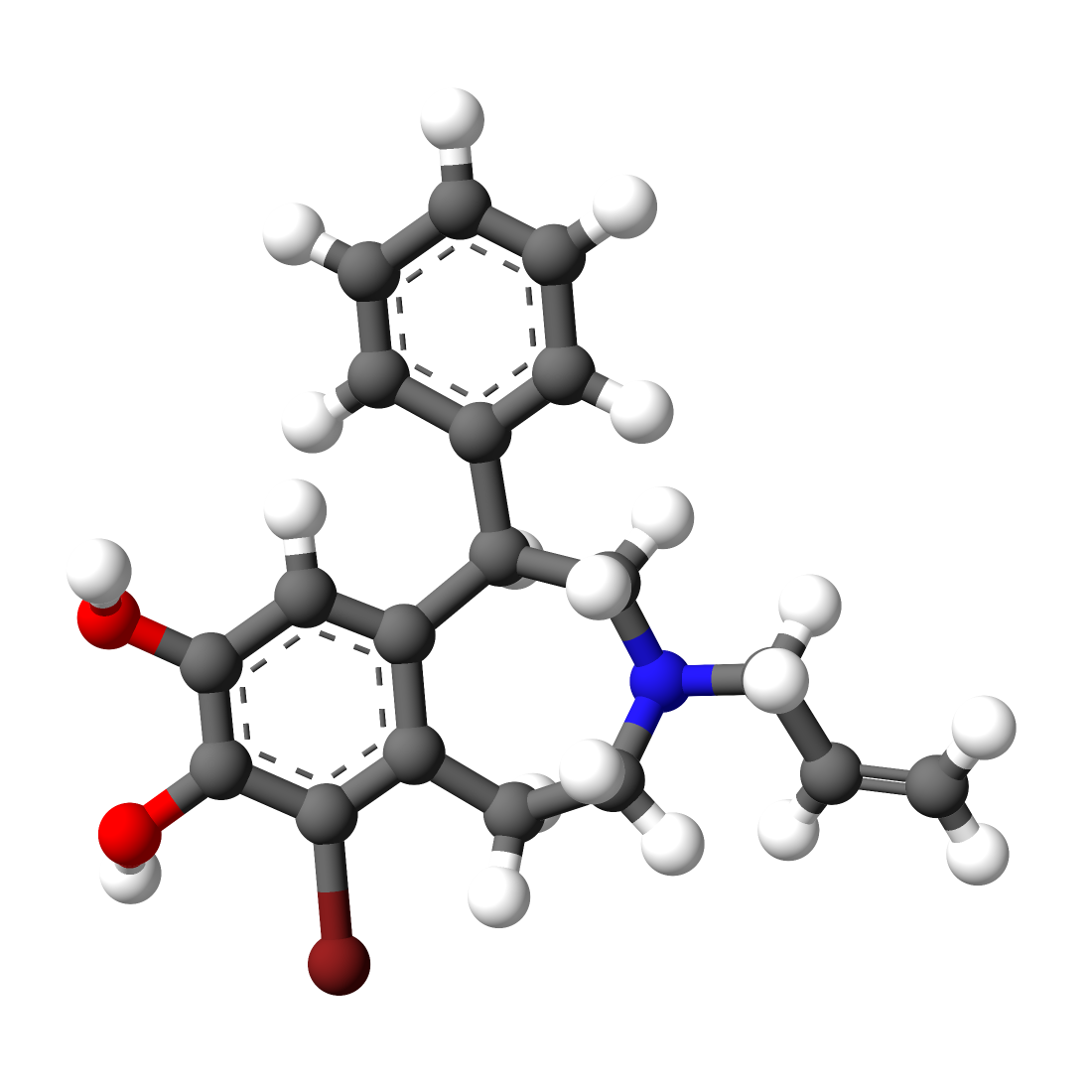

Clinical data
- Drug class: Dopamine D_{1} receptor agonist; Stimulant
- ATC code: None

Identifiers
- IUPAC name: 3-allyl-6-bromo-1-phenyl-1,2,4,5-tetrahydro-3-benzazepine-7,8-diol
- CAS Number: 135974-57-1
- PubChem CID: 11957483
- ChemSpider: 8627436
- ChEMBL: ChEMBL34095
- CompTox Dashboard (EPA): DTXSID40474680

Chemical and physical data
- Formula: C_{19}H_{20}BrNO_{2}
- Molar mass: 374.278 g·mol^{−1}
- 3D model (JSmol): Interactive image
- SMILES: c3ccccc3C2CN(CC=C)CCc(c1Br)c2cc(O)c1O
- InChI: InChI=1S/C19H20BrNO2/c1-2-9-21-10-8-14-15(11-17(22)19(23)18(14)20)16(12-21)13-6-4-3-5-7-13/h2-7,11,16,22-23H,1,8-10,12H2/t16-/m1/s1; Key:KKZGFVAZUKHFAC-MRXNPFEDSA-N

6-Br-APB is a synthetic and selective dopamine D_{1} receptor agonist and stimulant-like drug of the 3-benzazepine family. It is a cyclized phenethylamine and modified derivative of the monoamine neurotransmitter dopamine. The (R)-enantiomer is a potent dopamine D_{1} receptor full agonist, while the (S) enantiomer retains selectivity but is a weak partial agonist of the receptor. (R)-6-Br-APB and similar dopamine D_{1} receptor-selective full agonists like SKF-81,297 and SKF-82,958 produce characteristic anorectic effects, stereotyped behaviour, and self-administration in animals, with a similar but not identical profile to that of dopaminergic stimulants such as amphetamine.

== See also ==
- Substituted 3-benzazepine
- Cyclized phenethylamine
