= SKF-82,958 =

Chemical compound

Clinical data
- Other names: SKF-82958; SKF82958; SK&F-82958; SK&F-82,958
- Drug class: Dopamine D_{1}-like receptor agonist
- ATC code: None

Identifiers
- IUPAC name: 3-allyl-6-chloro-1-phenyl-1,2,4,5-tetrahydro-3-benzazepine-7,8-diol
- CAS Number: 80751-65-1
- PubChem CID: 1225
- ChemSpider: 1188
- UNII: 7W60FE897Q
- ChEMBL: ChEMBL317741
- CompTox Dashboard (EPA): DTXSID70894837

Chemical and physical data
- Formula: C_{19}H_{20}ClNO_{2}
- Molar mass: 329.82 g·mol^{−1}
- 3D model (JSmol): Interactive image
- SMILES: C=CCN1CCC2=C(C(=C(C=C2C(C1)C3=CC=CC=C3)O)O)Cl
- InChI: InChI=1S/C19H20ClNO2/c1-2-9-21-10-8-14-15(11-17(22)19(23)18(14)20)16(12-21)13-6-4-3-5-7-13/h2-7,11,16,22-23H,1,8-10,12H2/t16-/m1/s1; Key:HJWHHQIVUHOBQN-MRXNPFEDSA-N

SKF-82,958 is a synthetic compound of the 3-benzazepine family that acts as a dopamine D_{1} and D_{5} receptor full agonist. SKF-82,958 and similar D_{1}-like-selective full agonists like SKF-81,297 and 6-Br-APB produce characteristic anorectic effects, hyperactivity and self-administration in animals, with a similar but not identical profile to that of dopaminergic stimulants such as amphetamine. SKF-82,958 was also subsequently found to act as an agonist of ERα with negligible activity at ERβ, making it a subtype-selective estrogen.

== See also ==
- Substituted 3-benzazepine
- Cyclized phenethylamine
