= Tavapadon =

Medication

Clinical data
- Trade names: Juvmo
- Other names: CVL-751; CVL751; PF-6649751; PF6649751; PF-06649751; PF06649751
- AHFS/Drugs.com: Juvmo
- License data: US DailyMed: Tavapadon
- Routes of administration: Oral
- Drug class: Dopamine receptor agonist; Antiparkinsonian agent
- ATC code: None

Legal status
- Legal status: US: ℞-only

Pharmacokinetic data
- Protein binding: 93% (albumin)
- Metabolism: CYP3A4
- Elimination half-life: 25.5 hours

Identifiers
- IUPAC name: (S)-1,5-dimethyl-6-(2-methyl-4-{[3-(trifluoromethyl)pyridin-2-yl]oxy}phenyl)pyrimidine-2,4(1H,3H)-dione
- CAS Number: 1643489-24-0
- PubChem CID: 86764100
- ChemSpider: 48062699
- UNII: PT4P8MJP8L
- KEGG: D11431
- ChEMBL: ChEMBL3697617
- CompTox Dashboard (EPA): DTXSID301337071

Chemical and physical data
- Formula: C_{19}H_{16}F_{3}N_{3}O_{3}
- Molar mass: 391.350 g·mol^{−1}
- 3D model (JSmol): Interactive image
- SMILES: CC1=C(C=CC(=C1)OC2=C(C=CC=N2)C(F)(F)F)C3=C(C(=O)NC(=O)N3C)C
- InChI: InChI=1S/C19H16F3N3O3/c1-10-9-12(28-17-14(19(20,21)22)5-4-8-23-17)6-7-13(10)15-11(2)16(26)24-18(27)25(15)3/h4-9H,1-3H3,(H,24,26,27); Key:AKQXQLUNFKDZBN-UHFFFAOYSA-N

Tavapadon, sold under the brand name Juvmo, is a dopamine receptor agonist used for the treatment of Parkinson's disease. It is taken by mouth.

Tavapadon was approved for medical use in the United States in September 2026.

== Medical uses ==
Tavapadon is indicated for the treatment of Parkinson's disease in adults.

== Contraindications ==
Tavapadon has no contraindications.

== Side effects ==
Side effects of tavapadon may include nausea, headache, dizziness, fatigue or asthenia, dysgeusia, vomiting, dry mouth, and anxiety. Other potential but less common side effects include hypotension, orthostatic hypotension, impulsive control problems, compulsive behaviors, hallucinations, psychotic-like behaviors, and dyskinesia.

== Interactions ==
Tavapadon is substrate for CYP3A4 and hence interacts with CYP3A4 inhibitors and inducers. In addition to being a CYP3A4 substrate, tavapadon is a CYP3A4 inducer and can interact with CYP3A4 substrates. It is also a CYP2C8 inhibitor and can interact with CYP2C8 substrates. Tavapadon is a BCRP inhibitor and can interact with substrates of this protein as well.

== Pharmacology ==
=== Pharmacodynamics ===
Tavapadon acts as a highly selective partial agonist of the dopamine D_{1} receptor (K_{i} = 9 nM; IA = 65%) and the dopamine D_{5} receptor (K_{i} = 13 nM; IA = 81%). It has no significant affinity or functional activity at the D_{2}-like receptors (D_{2}, D_{3}, D_{4}) (K_{i} ≥ 4,870 to 6,720 nM). Tavapadon also shows biased agonism for G_{s}-coupled signaling at the D_{1}-like receptors.

=== Pharmacokinetics ===
Peak levels of tavapadon are reached after approximately 2 to 4 hours with oral administration. It shows dose-proportional pharmacokinetics across its maintenance dosage range. Food does not significantly modify the pharmacokinetics of tavapadon and it can be taken without regard for food. The volume of distribution of tavapadon is 63.5 L. Its plasma protein binding is 93%, primarily to albumin. Tavapadon is primarily metabolized by CYP3A4. It has a major inactive metabolite. Unchanged tavapadon is excreted less than 1% in urine and feces. Its major inactive metabolite was excreted less than 5% in urine and feces. The elimination half-life of tavapadon is 25.5 hours.

== History ==
Tavapadon was developed by Cerevel Therapeutics, which acquired it from Pfizer in 2018.

== Society and culture ==
=== Legal status ===
Tavapadon was approved for medical use in the United States in September 2026.

=== Names ===
Tavapadon is the international nonproprietary name, and the United States Adopted Name.

Tavapadon is sold under the brand name Juvmo.
