= Benzazepine =

1H-1-Benzazepine

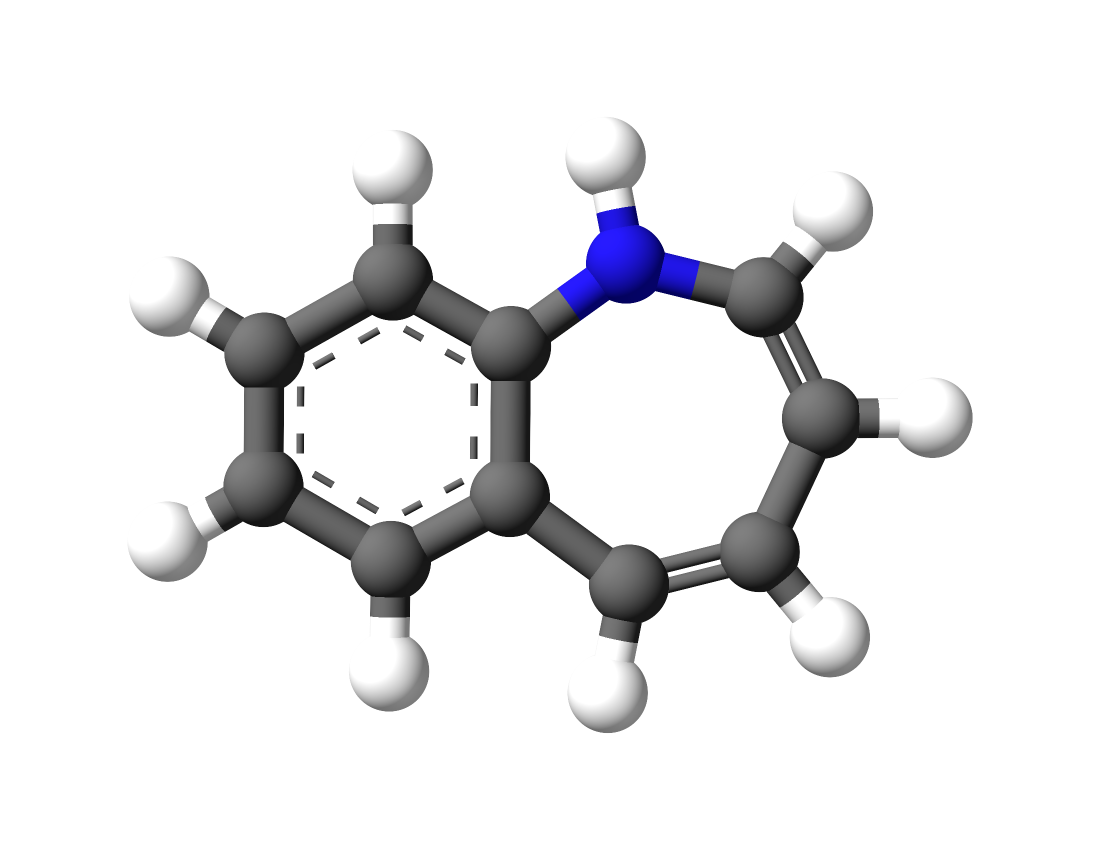

Names
- IUPAC name 1H-1-benzazepine

Identifiers
CAS Number	264-54-0
3D model (JSmol)	Interactive image
ChEBI	CHEBI:38430
ChemSpider	10610937
PubChem CID	15559658
UNII	SZ3R9B2X6A
CompTox Dashboard (EPA)	DTXSID801028619
- InChI: InChI=1S/C10H9N/c1-2-7-10-9(5-1)6-3-4-8-11-10/h1-8,11H Key: DQFQCHIDRBIESA-UHFFFAOYSA-N; InChI=1/C10H9N/c1-2-7-10-9(5-1)6-3-4-8-11-10/h1-8,11H Key: DQFQCHIDRBIESA-UHFFFAOYAX
- SMILES: C12=CC=CC=C1NC=CC=C2

Properties
Chemical formula	C_{10}H_{9}N
Molar mass	143.189 g·mol^{−1}
- Except where otherwise noted, data are given for materials in their standard state (at 25 °C [77 °F], 100 kPa). verify (what is ?) Infobox references

Benzazepines are heterocyclic chemical compounds consisting of a benzene ring fused to an azepine ring. There are three different isomers of benzazepine, including 1-benzazepine, 2-benzazepine, and 3-benzazepine. Examples of substituted benzazepine derivatives include:

Benazepril

Fenoldopam

GSK-189,254

Ivabradine

Semagacestat

Varenicline

Trepipam

SKF-38,393

== See also ==
- Substituted 3-benzazepine
- Benzodiazepine
- Dibenzazepine
