= List of investigational Parkinson's disease drugs =

Investigational Parkinson's disease drugs

This is a list of investigational Parkinson's disease drugs, or drugs that are currently under development for clinical use in the treatment of Parkinson's disease but are not yet approved. They may also be referred to as investigational antiparkinsonian agents.

Chemical/generic names are listed first, with developmental code names, synonyms, and brand names in parentheses. The format of list items is "Name (Synonyms) – Mechanism of Action [Reference]".

This list was last comprehensively updated in September 2025. It is likely to become outdated with time.

== Under development ==
=== Preregistration ===
- AIP-201 – positron-emission tomography (PET) enhancer – diagnosis
- Levodopa/carbidopa subcutaneous (ND-0612; ND-0680) – combination of levodopa (dopamine precursor) and carbidopa (aromatic L-amino acid decarboxylase (AAAD) inhibitor)

=== Phase 3 ===
- Altropane (123-I Altropane; [123I]-E-IACFT; NAV-5001; O-587) – dopamine reuptake inhibitor (DRI) and single-photon emission-computed tomography (SPECT) enhancer
- Apomorphine (Aporon) – non-selective dopamine receptor agonist and other actions
- Apomorphine sublingual film (APL-130277; Kynmobi) – non-selective dopamine receptor agonist and other actions
- Bemdaneprocel (BRT-DA01; DA-01; MSK-DA01; pluripotent stem cell derived dopaminergic neurons) – dopaminergic cell replacement
- Buntanetap ((+)-(3aR)-phenserine; (+)-phenserine; ANVS-401; ANVS-405; ANVS402; posiphen) – various actions
- 18F-LBT-999 ([18F]-LBT-999; LBT-999) – dopamine reuptake inhibitor (DRI) and positron-emission tomography (PET) enhancer – diagnosis
- Nabilone controlled release (Nabilone FDT) – cannabinoid CB_{1} and CB_{2} receptor agonist
- Pramipexole/rasagiline (P2B-001; rasagiline/pramipexole) – combination of pramipexole (dopamine D_{2}-like receptor agonist) and rasagiline (MAO-B inhibitor)
- Remlifanserin (ACP-204) – serotonin 5-HT_{2A} receptor antagonist – Parkinson's disease psychosis
- Solengepras (CVN-424) – G protein-coupled receptor 6 (GPR6) inhibitor
- Tavapadon (CVL-751; PF-6649751; PF-06649751) – dopamine D_{1} and D_{5} receptor agonist

=== Phase 2/3 ===
- BHV-8000 (TLL-041) – Janus kinase 1 inhibitor and TYK2 kinase inhibitor
- Mesdopetam (IRL-790) – dopamine D_{2} and D_{3} receptor antagonist and other actions

=== Phase 2 ===
- 18F PI-2620 ([18F]PI-2620; PI-2620) – positron-emission tomography (PET) enhancer – diagnosis
- AB-1005 (AAV2-GDNF; AMT-140; adeno-associated-virus-GDNF therapy) – gene transference and glial cell line-derived neurotrophic factor (GDNF) expression stimulant
- Affitope PD01 (ACI-7104; ACI-7104.056; Affitope-PD01A; PD-01; PD-01A) – peptide vaccine against α-synuclein
- Altropane ^{123}I (dopamine transporter (DAT) imaging radiopharmaceutical) – dopamine reuptake inhibitor (DRI) and single-photon emission-computed tomography (SPECT) enhancer – diagnosis
- Apomorphine inhalation (AZ-009; Staccato® Apomorphine) – non-selective dopamine receptor agonist and other actions
- Apomorphine intranasal (AL-101) – non-selective dopamine receptor agonist and other actions
- Aprepitant/pramipexole (ALTO-208; CTC-413) – combination of aprepitant (neurokinin NK_{1} receptor antagonist) and pramipexole (dopamine D_{2}-like receptor agonist)
- Bezisterim (17α-ethynyl-5-androstene-3β,7β,17β-triol; HE-3286; NE-3107; Triolex) – undefined mechanism of action (synthetic androstenetriol analogue and anti-inflammatory)
- Blarcamesine (AE-37; ANA001; ANAVEX 2-73) – sigma σ_{1} receptor agonist, muscarinic acetylcholine M_{1} receptor agonist, and ionotropic glutamate NMDA receptor agonist
- Buspirone/zolmitriptan (AV-2860; JM-010) – combination of buspirone (serotonin 5-HT_{1A} receptor agonist and other actions) and zolmitriptan (serotonin 5-HT_{1B} and 5-HT_{1D} receptor agonist) – drug-induced dyskinesia in Parkinson's disease
- Carbidopa/levodopa (DopaFuse; levodopa/carbidopa continuous release) – combination of carbidopa (aromatic L-amino acid decarboxylase (AAAD) inhibitor) and levodopa (dopamine precursor)
- Carbidopa/levodopa intranasal (INP-107; POD™ carbidopa/levodopa) – combination of carbidopa (aromatic L-amino acid decarboxylase (AAAD) inhibitor) and levodopa (dopamine precursor)
- DA-9805 – antioxidant and mitochondrial protein modulator
- Deferiprone (CGP-37391; CMX-001; CP-020; CP-20; CRMD-001; Ferriprox; Kelfer; L1; Upkanz) – chelating agent
- EPI-589 ((R)-troloxamide quinone; kinoquinone) – NAD(P)H dehydrogenase (quinone) modulator and antioxidant
- FNP-150 – undefined mechanism of action
- Gemfibrozil (FHL-301) – peroxisome proliferator-activated receptor alpha (PPARα) agonist
- Glovadalen (UCB-0022) – dopamine D_{1} receptor positive allosteric modulator
- GRF-6021 (AKST-6021) – plasma protein fraction and neurogenesis stimulant
- ION-859 (BIIB-094; ION859; IONIS-BIIB7Rx) – leucine-rich repeat kinase 2 (LRRK2) inhibitor
- Lazucirnon (AKST-4290; ALK-429; ALK-4290) – chemokine CCL11 inhibitor
- Levetiracetam low-dose (AGB-101) – synaptic vesicle glycoprotein 2A (SV2A) modulator
- Levodopa (TR-012001) – dopamine precursor and indirect non-selective dopamine receptor agonist
- Levodopa intranasal (INP103; POD™ levodopa) – dopamine precursor and indirect non-selective dopamine receptor agonist
- Matsupexole (AM006; KDT-3594) – dopamine receptor agonist
- Minzasolmin (DLX-313; UCB-0599) – α-synuclein misfolding inhibitor
- Nilotinib (KFRX-01) – Bcr-Abl tyrosine kinase inhibitor and discoidin domain receptor antagonist
- Pariceract (BIA 28-6156; LTI-291) – β-glucocerebrosidase (GCase) activator
- Pegsebrenatide (NLY-01; Olaedin; pegylated exenatide; TLY-001) – glucagon-like peptide-1 receptor (GLP_{1}R) agonist
- Pirepemat (IRL-752) – various actions
- Pramipexole – dopamine D_{2}, D_{3}, and D_{4} receptor agonist
- Prasinezumab (NEOD-002; PRX-002; RG-7935; RO-7046015) – monoclonal antibody against α-synuclein
- Pridopidine (ACR-16; ASP-2314; FR-310826; Huntexil; Nurzigma; TV-7820) – sigma σ_{1} receptor agonist and other actions
- Radotinib (IY-5511; Supect) – Bcr-Abl tyrosine kinase inhibitor and other actions
- Risvodetinib (Ikt-148009; IkT148009; risvo) – Bcr-Abl tyrosine kinase inhibitor
- Squalamine (ENT-01; Enterin-01; kenterin) – various actions
- Tributyrin (glyceryl tributyrate) – butyric acid (butyrate) prodrug and various actions
- Usnoflast (ZYIL-1) – NLR family pyrin domain containing 3 (NLRP3) inhibitor
- Vatiquinone (α-tocotrienol quinone; vincerenone; EPI-743 and PTC-743) – coenzyme Q10 analogue, antioxidant, oxidoreductase inhibitor, 15-lipoxygenase (15-LOX/ALOX15) inhibitor
- Vodobatinib (K-0706; SCO-088; SUN-K706; SUN-K0706) – Bcr-Abl tyrosine kinase inhibitor
- VTX-3232 – NLR family pyrin domain containing 3 (NLRP3) inhibitor
- Vutiglabridin (HSG-4112) – paraoxonase 2 (PON2) agonist and glabridin analogue
- WID-2101 – undefined mechanism of action
- XJN-010 – undefined mechanism of action

=== Phase 1/2 ===
- Ambroxol – β-glucocerebrosidase (GCase) activator and/or chaperone
- ANPD-001 (A9-line dopamine neuron therapy) – dopaminergic cell replacement
- CT1-DAP001/DSP-1083 (allo iPS cell-derived dopamine neural progenitor) – dopaminergic cell replacement
- EC-5026 (BPN-19186) – epoxide hydrolase inhibitor
- HER-096 (CDNF; cerebral dopamine neurotrophic factor; rhCDNF) – neuron modulator
- IPT-803 – dopamine modulator and opioid receptor antagonist
- Liposomal GM1 (GM1-Gangliosid; Talineuren; TLGM-1; TLN-1; TLSG-1) – undefined mechanism of action
- NouvNeu-001 (human dopaminergic progenitor cells) – cell replacement
- TED-A9 (A9-DPC; allogenic embryonic stem cell-derived A9 dopamine progenitor cell therapy; TED-A9) – dopaminergic cell replacement
- Trapidil (SB-0107) – undefined mechanism of action
- XC-130 (XC130; XC130-A10H) – dopamine receptor agonist, other actions
- Lu AF28996 (Lu AF-28996) – dopamine D_{1} and D_{2} receptor agonist

=== Phase 1 ===
- ABL-301 (SAR-446159) – bispecific antibody against α-synuclein
- ALS-205 (PMX-205) – complement C5a receptor antagonist
- ALX-001 (BMS-984923) – metabotropic glutamate mGlu_{5} receptor silent allosteric modulator
- ARV-102 – leucine-rich repeat kinase 2 (LRRK2) inhibitor
- ATH-399A (DWP-307399; HL-192) – nuclear receptor subfamily 4 group A member 2 (NR4A2) agonist
- CT-2500 – undefined mechanism of action
- FB-418 – Bcr-Abl tyrosine kinase inhibitor and leucine-rich repeat kinase 2 (LRRK2) inhibitor
- GT-02287 – β-glucocerebrosidase (GCase) activator and/or chaperone
- HL-400 – NLR family pyrin domain containing 3 (NLRP3) inhibitor
- HNC-364 (rasagiline prodrug) – monoamine oxidase B (MAO-B) inhibitor
- Human amniotic epithelial cell therapy - Shanghai iCELL Biotechnology (hAECs; hAESCs) – cell replacement
- JNJ-0376 – undefined mechanism of action
- JX-2105 – undefined mechanism of action
- LY-3962681 – RNA interference and α-synuclein expression modulator
- MEDI-1341 (TAK-341) – monoclonal antibody against α-synuclein
- NEU-723 – leucine-rich repeat kinase 2 (LRRK2) inhibitor
- NN-9001 – undefined mechanism of action
- PK-081 – α-synuclein degrader
- Selnoflast (NLRP3i; RG-6418; RO-7486967; Somalix) – NLR family pyrin domain containing 3 (NLRP3) inhibitor inhibitor
- TRN-501 – undefined mechanism of action
- VQ-101 – glucosylceramidase stimulant
- WID-2301 – undefined mechanism of action
- WIT-2001 – undefined mechanism of action

=== Preclinical ===
- AB-300 (AB300) – non-hallucinogenic serotonin 5-HT_{2A} and 5-HT_{2C} receptor agonist
- AB-5006 (AX-5006) – Escherichia coli csgA protein aggregation inhibitor and gastrointestinal microbiome modulator
- AEX-23 – orexin OX_{1} receptor agonist and α-synuclein aggregate/modulator
- Afamelanotide ([Nle4,DPhe7]-α-MSH; CUV-1647; EPT-1647; Melanotan I; Melanotan; MT-I; Prenumbra; Scenesse) – melanocortin receptor agonist
- Alpha-synuclein aggregation inhibitor (ACI-5755; morphomer α-synuclein) – α-synuclein inhibitor
- BEBT-758 – RNA interference and α-synuclein expression inhibitor
- Bevemipretide (SBT-272) – cardiolipin ligand and stabilizer
- BSC-3301 – receptor-interacting serine/threonine-protein kinase 1 (RIPK1) inhibitor
- BXQ-350 (SapC; SapC-DOPS; sphingolipid activator protein C) – sphingomyelin phosphodiesterase stimulant and sphingosine 1-phosphate stimulant
- Cannabidiol (CBD) – cannabinoid receptor modulator and other actions
- Carbon monoxide (CO; HBI-002) – heme oxygenase 1 modulator
- CB-401 – amyloid β-protein modulator
- CBT-102 – undefined mechanism of action
- CJRB-301 (MRx-0005) – bacteria replacement and microbiome modulator
- CJRB-302 (MRx-0029) – bacteria replacement and microbiome modulator
- CK-0803 – regulatory T-lymphocyte replacement
- CU-13001 – 15-lipoxygenase (15-LOX/ALOX15) inhibitor
- EHP-102 (VCE-003.2) – cannabinoid CB_{2} receptor agonist and peroxisome proliferator-activated receptor alpha (PPARα) modulator (cannabigerol (CBG) derivative)
- Estianeptine ((S)-tianeptine; TNX-4300) – peroxisome proliferator-activated receptor PPARβ/δ and PPARγ agonist
- FHL-401 – toll-like receptor 2 antagonist
- FHL-701 – interleukin-12 (IL-12) subunit p40 inhibitor
- FKK-01PD (FKK-01PD; TGHW-01AP; apomorphine prodrug) – non-selective dopamine receptor agonist and other actions
- HT-4403 – leucine-rich repeat kinase 2 (LRRK2) inhibitor
- IC-100 (ICCN-100) – various actions
- KFRX-05 (BK-40195) – leucine-rich repeat kinase 2 (LRRK2) inhibitor and protein tyrosine kinase inhibitor
- KP-405 – undefined mechanism of action
- LB-P4 – bacteria replacement and microbiome modulator
- Mbiotix – bacteria replacement and microbiome modulator
- ML-021 – muscarinic acetylcholine M_{4} receptor antagonist
- MP-201 – 2,4-dinitrophenol (DNP) prodrug and various actions
- NB-003 – gene transference and parkin protein replacement
- NB-129 – undefined mechanism of action
- NLY-02 – glial cell inhibitor
- NLY-03 – undefined mechanism of action
- NNI-362 – 70 kDa ribosomal protein S6 kinase modulator
- NRG-5051 – mitochondrial permeability transition pore inhibitor
- PMN-442 – monoclonal antibody against α-synuclein
- PP-003 – α-synuclein degrader
- Research programme: 3100 programme - DigmBio/Daegu Catholic University – G protein-coupled receptor (GPCR) modulators
- Research programme: enzyme targeted therapeutics - Nitrase Therapeutics – enzyme modulators and α-synuclein inhibitors
- Research programme: neurodegenerative disease therapeutics - Caraway Therapeutics – autophagy stimulants and MCOLN1 stimulants
- RGL-193 – undefined mechanism of action
- ST-502 – gene therapy and α-synuclein genetic transcription inhibitor
- Tomaralimab (NM-101; NM-102; NM-103; OPN-305) – monoclonal antibody against toll-like receptor 2
- Zervimesine (CT-1812; Elayta) – sigma σ_{2} receptor antagonist

=== Research ===
- 1ST-103 – undefined mechanism of action
- LXM-5 – undefined mechanism of action
- Parkinson's disease siRNA therapeutic - Argo Biopharma – RNA interference
- Research programme: Parkinson's disease therapeutics - Beech Tree Labs (PD-A) – undefined mechanism of action – parkinsonian disorders

=== Clinical phase unknown ===
- BT-0267 (BT-267) – leucine-rich repeat kinase 2 (LRRK2) inhibitor

== Not under development ==
=== Suspended ===
- Research programme: neuroinflammatory disorders therapeutics - Vasogen (VP-015) – cytokine modulators and immunomodulators

=== No development reported ===
- 4-Chlorokynurenine (4-CL-KYN; 7-CL-KYNA; AV-101) – ionotropic glutamate NMDA receptor antagonist and 3-hydroxyanthranilate oxidase inhibitor
- α-Synuclein picobody (a-syn-pico) – positron-emission tomography (PET) enhancer – diagnosis
- A-86929 – dopamine D_{1} receptor agonist
- AB-4166 – microbiome modulator
- ACI-12589 – positron-emission tomography (PET) enhancer – diagnosis
- Affitope-PD03 (PD03; PD03A) – α-synuclein inhibitor and immunostimulant
- ANPD-002 (ANPD002) – dopaminergic cell replacement
- AP-472 – metabotropic glutamate mGlu_{4} receptor positive allosteric modulator
- Aplindore (DAB-452; palindore; SLS-006; WAY-DAB 452) – dopamine D_{2} receptor agonist
- Armesocarb (MLR-1019) – atypical dopamine reuptake inhibitor (DRI)
- Atuzaginstat (COR-388) – peptide hydrolase inhibitor
- ATV:aSyn (ATV:α-synuclein; ATV:αSyn) – α-synuclein inhibitor
- Autologous adipose derived mesenchymal stem cells - Hope Biosciences – cell replacement
- AZ-001 – undefined mechanism of action
- Beperminogene perplasmid (AMG-0001; Collategene; hepatocyte growth factor gene therapy) – gene transference and hepatocyte growth factor (HGF) expression stimulant
- BTRX-246040 (LY-2940094) – nociceptin receptor (NOP) antagonist
- Cannabidiol/tetrahydrocannabinol (CBD/THC; CanChew; MedChew; THC/CBD) – cannabinoid CB_{1} and CB_{2} receptor agonist and other actions
- Carbidopa/levodopa (WD-1603) – combination of carbidopa (aromatic L-amino acid decarboxylase (AAAD) inhibitor) and levodopa (dopamine precursor)
- Carbidopa/levodopa oral solution (EXN-32) – combination of carbidopa (aromatic L-amino acid decarboxylase (AAAD) inhibitor) and levodopa (dopamine precursor)
- Ciforadenant (CPI-444, V-81444) – adenosine A_{2A} receptor antagonist
- CM-4612 (CM-ADHD; CM-AT; CM-PK) – enzyme replacement and modulator
- Crisdesalazine (AAD-2004) – microsomal prostaglandin E2 synthase-1 (mPGES-1) inhibitor
- CTx-GBA1 – gene transference
- Cu(II)ATSM (copper(II)-ATSM; Cu-ATSM) – neuron modulator
- Debamestrocel (autologous bone marrow derived mesenchymal stem cell therapy; NurOwn) – dopaminergic cell replacement
- DNL-201 – leucine-rich repeat kinase 2 (LRRK2) inhibitor
- Dopamine intranasal – non-selective dopamine receptor agonist
- DX-0308 (DX-308) – retinoic acid metabolism modulator
- Emrusolmin (anle-138b; TEV-56286) – α-synuclein inhibitor and protein aggregation inhibitor
- ESB-1609 – sphingosine-1-phosphate (S1P) receptor agonist
- ESB-5070 – leucine-rich repeat kinase 2 (LRRK2) inhibitor
- F-14413 – α_{2}-adrenergic receptor inverse agonist
- FB-101 (1ST-102) – Bcr-Abl tyrosine kinase inhibitor
- Fibroblast growth factor 1 (FGF-1) – fibroblast growth factor stimulant and angiogenesis-inducing agent
- GO-101 – gene transference
- GT-02329 – β-glucocerebrosidase (GCase) activator and/or chaperone
- ISC-hpNSC (human parthenogenetic neural stem cells) – dopaminergic cell replacement
- Itanapraced (CHF-5074; CSP-1103) – γ-secretase modulator and non-steroidal anti-inflammatory drug (NSAID) derivative lacking cyclooxygenase (COX) inhibition
- Levodopa deuterated (deuterium-containing levodopa; SD-1077) – dopamine precursor and indirect non-selective dopamine receptor agonist
- Liatermin (BVF-014; GDNF; glial-derived neutrotrophic factor; r-metHuGDNF) – neuron stimulant
- Lu-AE-04621 (Lu-AE04621) – dopamine receptor agonist (prodrug of Lu-AA40326)
- Masupirdine (SUVN-502; SUVN502) – serotonin 5-HT_{6} receptor antagonist
- Mesocarb (MLR-1017) – atypical dopamine reuptake inhibitor (DRI)
- MTK-458 – protein-serine-threonine kinase stimulant
- NPT-200-11 (NPT200-11; UCB-1332) – α-synuclein inhibitor
- NPT-520-34 (NPT520-34) – 1-phosphatidylinositol 3 kinase modulator and other actions
- ODM-104 – catechol O-methyltransferase (COMT) inhibitor
- OP-101 (dendrimer N-acetylcysteine) – various actions
- OP-501 – catechol O-methyltransferase (COMT) inhibitor
- Ordopidine (ACR-325) – low-affinity dopamine D_{2} receptor antagonist and dopaminergic stabilizer
- PD-04 (a-Syn-PD-04; Affitope PD-04; PD04) – peptide vaccine against α-synuclein
- Rasagiline – monoamine oxidase B (MAO-B) inhibitor
- Rasagiline transdermal patch (TPU-002RA) – monoamine oxidase B (MAO-B) inhibitor
- Research programme: adenosine A2A/A1 selective antagonists - Domain Therapeutics/CleveXel Pharma (CVXL-0069; DT-1133; DT0926; FP-0692; FP-1133) – adenosine A_{1} receptor antagonists and adenosine A_{2A} receptor antagonists
- Research programme: catalytic antioxidants - Aeolus Pharmaceuticals (AEOL-10113; AEOL-11207) – antioxidants
- Research programme: central nervous system therapeutics - Delpor – undefined mechanism of action
- Research programme: cGAS/STING antagonists - IFM Due – nucleotidyltransferase inhibitors
- Research programme: COMT inhibitors - Avalo Therapeutics (AVTX-406; CERC-425; CERC-406) – catechol O-methyltransferase (COMT) inhibitors
- Research programme: dopamine D1 receptor agonists - Takeda – dopamine D_{1} receptor agonists
- Research programme: exosome therapeutics - ArunA Biomedical – undefined mechanism of action
- Research programme: GPCR modulators - Nxera Pharma – various actions
- Research programme: KEAP1 inhibitors - Keapstone Therapeutics – Kelch-like ECH-associated protein 1 (KEAP1) inhibitors
- Research programme: long-acting neuropsychiatric therapeutics - Teva (NP-201; NP-202; risperidone/ropinirole implants) – various actions
- Research programme: LRRK2 inhibitor - GlaxoSmithKline – leucine-rich repeat kinase 2 (LRRK2) inhibitors
- Research programme: LRRK2 inhibitors - Novartis – leucine-rich repeat kinase 2 (LRRK2) inhibitors
- Research programme: neurodegenerative disorder gene therapies - Denali Therapeutics (AAV-LF2; CNS-directed AAV-based gene therapies) – gene transference
- Research programme: neurodegenerative disorders therapeutics - BioArctic Neuroscience (AD-0802; AD-1502; AD-2203; AE-1501; BAN-2203; BAN-2502; BAN2401 back-up) – various actions
- Research programme: neurodegenerative disorder therapeutics - Celgene Corporation/Evotec (BMSxxx) – cell replacements
- Research programme: neurodegenerative disease therapeutics - ProteoTech (DP-68; DP-74; PD-61-W3; PeptiClere; PTI-19; PTI-51; PTI-51-CH3; Synuclere; TauPro) – various actions
- Research programme: neurological disorders therapeutics - Gloriana therapeutics (ECB-PD; ECT-PD; Meteorin; Ns-G34; NsG-0301; NsG-33) – glial cell line-derived neurotrophic factor modulators
- Research programme: Parkinson's disease therapeutics - Alectos Therapeutics – glucocerebrosidase 2 (GBA2) protein inhibitor
- Research programme: Parkinson's disease therapies - Zymes (co-Q10; coenzyme Q10; ubidecarenone) – antioxidants
- Research programme: Parkinson's disease therapy - AbbVie – dopamine D_{2} and D_{3} receptor agonists
- Research programme: positive allosteric modulators - Proximagen – various actions
- Research programme: protective autoimmunity enhancer - Proneuron Biotechnologies (PN-277) – immunomodulators
- Research programme: protein phosphatase 2A modulators - Signum Biosciences (SIG-1012; SIG-1106) – protein phosphatase 2A (PP2A) modulator
- Research programme: small molecule therapeutics - Amathus Therapeutics – mitochondrial protein stimulants
- Research programme: small molecule therapeutics - Aranda Pharma/Tarrex Biopharma (ADA-308; ADA-409; Backup; MDA-308; MDA-409) – androgen receptor antagonists
- Research programme: transmembrane protein 175 agonists - AbbVie/Caraway Therapeutics – TMEM175 stimulants
- Rotigotine controlled release (SER-214) – non-selective dopamine receptor agonist and other actions
- S-32504 – dopamine D_{2} and D_{3} receptor agonist
- SAGE-324 (BIIB-124) – GABA_{A} receptor positive allosteric modulator and neurosteroid
- Saracatinib (AZD-0530) – Src-family kinase inhibitor
- Selegiline transdermal (Emsam) – monoamine oxidase B (MAO-B) inhibitor and other actions
- Seridopidine (ACR343; ACR-343) – dopamine receptor modulator and so-called "dopaminergic stabilizer"
- SLS-004 (LV-dCas9-DNMT3A) – gene therapy and α-synuclein expression inhibitor
- Sonlicromanol (KH-176) – prostaglandin-E synthase inhibitor and reactive oxygen species modulator
- SPN-803 (SPN803) – undefined mechanism of action
- STEL-101 (AMA-101; STL-101) – undefined mechanism of action
- UB-312 – immunostimulant
- YKP-10461 (SKL-PD; YKP10461) – monoamine oxidase B (MAO-B) inhibitor
- YTX-7739 – stearoyl-CoA desaturase inhibitor
- Xenon (NBTX-001) – ionotropic glutamate NMDA receptor antagonist

=== Discontinued ===
- 2-BUMP – monoamine oxidase B (MAO-B) inhibitor
- A-77636 – dopamine D_{1} receptor agonist
- Acamprosate/baclofen (PXT-864) – combination of acamprosate (various actions) and baclofen (GABA_{B} receptor agonist)
- Adrogolide (ABT-431; DAS-431; A-86929 O,O′-diacetate) – dopamine D_{1} receptor agonist (prodrug of A-86929)
- AP-001 – various actions
- Apomorphine inhalation (VR-004; VR-040; VR-400) – non-selective dopamine receptor agonist and other actions
- Apomorphine intranasal – non-selective dopamine receptor agonist and other actions
- Apomorphine subcutaneous (ND-0701) – non-selective dopamine receptor agonist and other actions
- Apomorphine transdermal patch – non-selective dopamine receptor agonist and other actions
- Arimoclomol (BRX-345; Miplyffa; OR-01; OR-04) – undefined mechanism of action
- Arundic acid (Arocyte Injection; Cereact Capsule; MK-0724; ONO-2506; Proglia) – various actions
- Atomoxetine (LY-139603; Strattera; Tomoxetine) – norepinephrine reuptake inhibitor (NRI)
- AVE-8112 (AVE8112; AVE-8112A) – phosphodiesterase PDE4 inhibitor
- AX-201 (AX201) – nerve growth factor (NGF) stimulant
- Bifeprunox (DU-127090) – serotonin 5-HT_{1A} receptor agonist and dopamine D_{2} receptor agonist
- BP-897 – dopamine D_{3} receptor agonist
- Carbidopa/levodopa (AP-09004; AP-CD/LD) – combination of carbidopa (aromatic L-amino acid decarboxylase (AAAD) inhibitor) and levodopa (dopamine precursor)
- CEP-1347 (KT-7515) – mitogen-activated protein kinase inhibitor and mixed-lineage kinase inhibitor
- CERE-120 (AAV-NRTN; AAV-NTN; AAV2-neurturin; AAV2-NTN; neurturin gene therapy) – gene therapy, nerve tissue protein modulator, and neurturin agonist
- Cinpanemab (BIIB-054) – monoclonal antibody against α-synuclein
- CVXL-0107 – glutamate release inhibitor
- Dactolisib (BEZ-235; NVP-BEZ-235; NVP-BEZ235-ANA; NVP-BEZ235-NX; RTB-101) – 1-phosphatidylinositol 3 kinase inhibitor and mTOR inhibitor
- Davunetide intranasal (AL-108; NAP; NAPVSIPQ) – various actions
- Dihydrexidine (DAR-0100) – dopamine D_{1} receptor agonist
- Dihydrexidine (IP-202) – dopamine D_{1} and D_{5} receptor agonist
- DNS-7801 – undefined mechanism of action
- Embryonic neural cell therapy-Parkinson's Disease - CellFactors (Parkinson's disease cell therapy) – dopaminergic cell replacement
- Emlenoflast (inzomelid; IZD-174; MCC-7840) – NLR family pyrin domain containing 3 (NLRP3) inhibitor
- Entacapone (Comtan; Comtess; OR-611) – catechol O-methyltransferase (COMT) inhibitor
- Ethyl eicosapentaenoic acid (AMR-101; Ethyl-EPA; LAX-101; Miraxion; Vascepa; Vazkepa) – various actions
- Etrabamine (14-839JL; JL-14839) – dopamine D_{2} receptor agonist
- Ezaladcigene resoparvovec (AAV-AADC; AV-201; GZ-404477; NBIb-1817) – gene transference and aromatic-_{L}-amino-acid decarboxylase (AAAD) replacement
- Fipamezole (BVF-025; JP-1730) – α_{2}-adrenergic receptor antagonist
- Florbenazine F18 (18F-DTBZ; 18F-AV-133; 18F-FP-dihydrotatetrabenazine; AV-133) – vesticular monoamine transporter 2 (VMAT2) inhibitor and radiopharmaceutical – diagnosis
- Foliglurax (PXT-2331; PXT002331) – metabotropic glutamate mGlu_{4} receptor positive allosteric modulator
- FRM-0334 (EVP-0334) – class I and class II histone deacetylase inhibitor
- GYKI-52895 – dopamine reuptake inhibitor (DRI)
- Levetiracetam (Keppra; L-059; SIB-S1; UCB-059; UCB-22059; UCB-L059) – synaptic vesicle glycoprotein 2A (SV2A) modulator
- Lu-AA47070 (LU-AA-47070) – adenosine A_{2A} receptor antagonist
- Methylthioninium chloride (MTC; methylene blue; TRx-0014; TRx-014) – various actions
- Naxagolide (L-647339) – dopamine D_{2} and D_{3} receptor agonist
- Nebicapone (BIA-3202) – catechol O-methyltransferase (COMT) inhibitor
- Nitecapone (OR-462) – catechol O-methyltransferase (COMT) inhibitor
- Nitisinone (NTBC; Orfadin; SC-0735; SYN-118) – 4-hydroxyphenylpyruvate dioxygenase inhibitor and dopamine release stimulant
- NPT-088 (NPT088) – immunoglobulin fusion general amyloid interaction motif (GAIM) based dimer
- NPT-189 (NPT189) – immunoglobulin fusion protein
- NW-1048 – monoamine oxidase B (MAO-B) inhibitor
- NYX-458 – ionotropic glutamate NMDA receptor positive allosteric modulator
- ODM-103 – catechol O-methyltransferase (COMT) inhibitor
- Omigapil (CGP-3466; SNT-317; TCH-346) – glyceraldehyde 3 phosphate dehydrogenase (GAPDH) inhibitor
- OPM-201 (S-221237) – leucine-rich repeat kinase 2 (LRRK2) inhibitor
- OSU-6162 (OSU6162; PNU-9639; PNU-96391; PNU-96391A) – serotonin 5-HT_{2A} receptor partial agonist (non-hallucinogenic), dopamine D_{2} receptor partial agonist, and sigma σ_{1} receptor ligand (so-called "monoaminergic stabilizer")
- Paliroden (SR-57667; SR-57667B) – nerve growth factor (NGF) stimulant
- Pardoprunox (SLV-308; SME-308) – dopamine D_{2} and D_{3} receptor partial agonist, serotonin 5-HT_{1A} receptor full agonist, and other actions
- Parkinson's disease gene therapy - Oxford BioMedica (AXO Lenti PD; OXB-101; OXB-102; ProSavin) – gene transference
- Pegipanermin (DN-TNF; INB-03; LIVNate™; Quellor™; soluble tumour necrosis factor inhibitor; XENP1595; XENP345; XPro 1595; XPro595; XProTM) – tumour necrosis factor alpha (TNFα) inhibitor and immunostimulant
- PF-06412562 (CVL-562) – dopamine D_{1} and D_{5} receptor partial agonist
- Piclozotan (SUN-4057; SUN-N-4057) – serotonin 5-HT_{1A} receptor agonist – dyskinesia in Parkinson's disease
- Preclamol ((–)-3-PPP) – dopamine D_{2} receptor partial agonist
- Preladenant (MK-3814; privadenant; SCH-420814) – adenosine A_{2A} receptor antagonist
- Proxison – synthetic flavonoid-based antioxidant
- Quinelorane (LY-163502) – dopamine D_{2} receptor agonist
- Raseglurant (ADX-10059) – metabotropic glutamate mGlu_{5} receptor negative allosteric modulator
- Razpipadon (CVL-871; PF-6669571; PF-06669571; PW-0464) – dopamine D_{1} receptor agonist
- Renzapride (ATL-1251; AZM-112; BRL-24924) – serotonin 5-HT_{3} receptor antagonist and serotonin 5-HT_{4} receptor agonist
- Research programme: Alzheimer's and Parkinson's disease diagnostic agents - Bayer HealthCare Pharmaceuticals/TauRx – undefined mechanism of action – diagnosis
- Research programme: AMC therapeutics - Animuscure – undefined mechanism of action
- Research programme: Ig fusion GAIM dimers - Proclara Biosciences (NPT-288; NPT-007; NPT-014; NPT-289) – various actions
- Research programme: Parkinson's disease therapeutics - Araclon Biotech (AB-03) – undefined mechanism of action
- Research programme: Parkinson's disease therapies - Neose/Neuronyx – undefined mechanism of action
- Research programme: Parkinson's disease therapies - Proteome Systems (EUK-418) – free radical scavenger and oxygen radical scavenger
- Research programme: Parkinson's disease therapeutics - TauRx Therapeutics (G2 PD; TRx 018) – synuclein inhibitor
- Research programme: protein aggregation inhibitors - Proclara Biosciences (NPT-001; NPT-002) – various actions
- Riluzole (PK-26124; Rilutek; RP-54274) – various actions
- Ropinirole implant – dopamine D_{2}, D_{3}, and D_{4} receptor agonist
- Sarsasapogenin (Cogane; JNX-1001; PYM-50028; Smilagenin) – various actions
- Sipagladenant (KW-6356) – adenosine A_{2A} receptor antagonist
- SPD-474 – undefined mechanism of action
- Sumanirole (PNU-95666; U-95666) – dopamine D_{2} receptor agonist
- TAK-065 – undefined mechanism of action
- TAK-071 – muscarinic acetylcholine M_{1} receptor positive allosteric modulator
- Tc 99m TRODAT-1 – single-photon emission-computed tomography (SPECT) enhancer – diagnosis
- Terguride (Dironyl; Mysalfon; SH-406; Teluron; transdihydrolisuride; VUFB-6638; ZK-31224) – dopamine D_{2} receptor agonist and other actions
- Tozadenant (A2a-(3); RO4494351; SYN-115) – adenosine A_{2A} receptor antagonist
- Utreloxastat (EPI-857; PTC-857) – 15-lipoxygenase (15-LOX/ALOX15) inhibitor
- Vipadenant (BG-14; BIIB-014; BIIB14; CEB-4520; V-2006; VER-11135; VER-A00-11; VER-A00049; VER-ADO-49; VR-2006) – adenosine A_{2A} receptor antagonist

== Clinically used drugs ==
=== Approved drugs ===
==== Dopamine precursors and related ====
- Carbidopa (Lodosyn) – aromatic L-amino acid decarboxylase (AAAD) inhibitor
- Carbidopa/levodopa (Crexont; IPX-203; IPX203) – combination of carbidopa (aromatic L-amino acid decarboxylase (AAAD) inhibitor) and levodopa (dopamine precursor)
- Foscarbidopa/foslevodopa (ABBV-951; foslevodopa/foscarbidopa; levodopa/carbidopa prodrug; Produodopa; Vyalev) – combination of foscarbidopa (aromatic L-amino acid decarboxylase (AAAD) inhibitor) and foslevodopa (dopamine precursor)
- Levodopa (CVT-301; CXG-89; Inbrija) – dopamine precursor and indirect non-selective dopamine receptor agonist
- Levodopa/benserazide (co-beneldopa) (Madopar, Prolopa) – combination of levodopa (dopamine precursor) and benserazide (aromatic L-amino acid decarboxylase (AAAD) inhibitor)
- Levodopa/carbidopa extended-release (GSK-587124; IPX-066; Numient; Patrome; Rytary) – combination of levodopa (dopamine precursor) and carbidopa (aromatic L-amino acid decarboxylase (AAAD) inhibitor)
- Levodopa/carbidopa intraduodenal (ABT-SLV187; carbidopa/levodopa enteral suspension; Duodopa; Duopa; LCIG; levodopa/carbidopa intestinal gel) – combination of levodopa (dopamine precursor) and carbidopa (aromatic L-amino acid decarboxylase (AAAD) inhibitor)
- Melevodopa/carbidopa (carbidopa/melevodopa; CHF-1512; CNP-1512; GT-1512; levodopa methyl ester/carbidopa; Sirio; V-1512) – combination of melevodopa (dopamine precursor) and carbidopa (aromatic L-amino acid decarboxylase (AAAD) inhibitor)

==== Dopamine receptor agonists ====
- Apomorphine (Apofin; CHF-1526) – non-selective dopamine receptor agonist and other actions
- Apomorphine subcutaneous (APO-go; Apokinon; Apokyn; Apomine; Britaject; KW-6500; Li Ke Ji; Movapo; Onapgotm; SPN-830) – non-selective dopamine receptor agonist and other actions
- Bromocriptine (Parlodel) – dopamine D_{2}-like receptor agonist and other actions
- Cabergoline (Dostinex) – dopamine D_{2}-like receptor agonist and other actions
- Dihydroergocryptine (DHEC; Almirid; Cripar) – dopamine D_{2}-like receptor agonist and other actions
- Lisuride (Dopergin) – dopamine D_{2}-like receptor agonist and other actions
- Pergolide (Permax) – dopamine D_{2}-like receptor agonist and other actions
- Piribedil (Trivastal, Pronoran) – dopamine D_{2}-like receptor agonist and other actions
- Pramipexole (BI-Sifrol; Daquiran; Mirapex; Mirapexin; Pexola; Sifrol; SND-919; SND-919Y) – dopamine D_{2}, D_{3}, and D_{4} receptor agonist
- Ropinirole (Adartrel; Repreve; Requip) – dopamine D_{2}, D_{3}, and D_{4} receptor agonist
- Ropinirole (Requip CR; Requip LP; Requip XL; Requip XR; SKF-101468A) – dopamine D_{2}, D_{3}, and D_{4} receptor agonist
- Ropinirole transdermal (Haruropi Tape; HP-3000) – non-selective dopamine receptor agonist and other actions
- Rotigotine transdermal (Leganto; N-0437; N-0923; Neupro; Neupro Patch; Nubrenza; SPM-962) – non-selective dopamine receptor agonist and other actions
- Talipexole (BHT-920; Domin) – dopamine D_{2} receptor agonist and α_{2}-adrenergic receptor agonist

==== Monoamine oxidase B (MAO-B) inhibitors ====
- Rasagiline (Agilect; AGN-1135; Azilect; Elbrus; Lu-00-773; TV-1030; TVP-101; TVP-1012) – monoamine oxidase B (MAO-B) inhibitor
- Safinamide (EMD-1195686; Equfina; FCE-26743; ME-2125; NW-1015; Onstryv; PNU-151774; Xadago; ZP-034) – reversible monoamine oxidase B (MAO-B) inhibitor and other actions
- Selegiline (Eldepryl, Jumex) – monoamine oxidase B (MAO-B) inhibitor and other actions
- Selegiline orally disintegrating tablet (Efupi; FPF-1100-NW; selegiline ODT) – monoamine oxidase B (MAO-B) inhibitor and other actions

==== Catechol O-methyltransferase (COMT) inhibitors ====
- Entacapone (Comtan) – catechol O-methyltransferase (COMT) inhibitor
- Opicapone (BIA 9-1067; BIA-91067; Ongentys; ONO-2370) – catechol O-methyltransferase (COMT) inhibitor
- Tolcapone (RO-407592; Tasmar) – catechol O-methyltransferase (COMT) inhibitor

==== Drugs with unknown mechanisms of action ====
- Amantadine (Symmetrel) – unknown mechanism of action and ionotropic glutamate NMDA receptor antagonist (indirect dopaminergic agent)
- Amantadine extended release (ADS-5101; ADS-5102; Gocovri; Nurelin) – unknown mechanism of action and ionotropic glutamate NMDA receptor antagonist (indirect dopaminergic agent) – drug-induced dyskinesia in Parkinson's disease
- Budipine (BY-701; Parkinsan) – unknown mechanism of action and ionotropic glutamate NMDA receptor antagonist

==== Combination drugs ====
- Carbidopa/entacapone/levodopa (LECIGel; LECIGon; Lecigon; Trigel) – combination of carbidopa (aromatic L-amino acid decarboxylase (AAAD) inhibitor), entacapone (catechol O-methyltransferase (COMT) inhibitor), and levodopa (dopamine precursor)
- Levodopa/carbidopa/entacapone (ELC-200; Stalevo; Stavelo) – combination of levodopa (dopamine precursor), carbidopa (aromatic L-amino acid decarboxylase (AAAD) inhibitor), and entacapone (catechol O-methyltransferase (COMT) inhibitor)

==== Other drugs ====
- Istradefylline (KW-6002; Nourianz; Nouriast) – adenosine A_{2A} receptor antagonist
- Pimavanserin (ACP-103; BVF-048; Nuplazid) – serotonin 5-HT_{2A} receptor antagonist – Parkinson's disease psychosis

=== Withdrawn drugs ===
- Amantadine extended release (ALLAY-LID; OS-320; Osmolex ER) – unknown mechanism of action and ionotropic glutamate NMDA receptor antagonist (indirect dopaminergic agent)

=== Off-label drugs ===
- Acetylcholinesterase inhibitors (e.g., donepezil, galantamine, rivastigmine) – cognitive impairment in Parkinson's disease
- Anticholinergics (antimuscarinics/muscarinic acetylcholine receptor antagonists) (e.g., trihexyphenidyl, procyclidine, diphenhydramine, benztropine, ethopropazine, cycrimine, biperiden, others)
- Antidepressants (e.g., SSRIs, SNRIs, TCAs, MAOIs, others) – depression in Parkinson's disease
- Atypical antipsychotics (e.g., clozapine, quetiapine) – Parkinson's disease psychosis
- Hypnotics (e.g., eszopiclone, melatonin – insomnia in Parkinson's disease
- Memantine (Namenda) – cognitive impairment in Parkinson's disease
- Serotonergic psychedelics (e.g., psilocybin)
- Stimulants and related (e.g., methylphenidate, modafinil) – fatigue and apathy in Parkinson's disease
- Wakefulness-promoting agents (e.g., caffeine, modafinil) – excessive sleepiness in Parkinson's disease

== See also ==
- Lists of investigational drugs
- List of investigational restless legs syndrome drugs
