= C14H20FNO2S =

The molecular formula C_{14}H_{20}FNO_{2}S (molar mass: 285.38 g/mol) may refer to:

- Seridopidine (ACR-343)
- Ordopidine (ACR-325)
