= Annovis Bio, Inc =

American clinical-stage biotechnology company

Annovis Bio, Inc.
- Formerly: QR Pharma, Inc.
- Type: Public
- Traded as: NYSE: ANVS
- Industry: Biotechnology
- Founded: 2008
- Founder: Maria Maccecchini
- Headquarters: Malvern, Pennsylvania, United States
- Key people: Maria Maccecchini (CEO)
- Website: www.annovisbio.com

Annovis Bio, Inc. is an American clinical-stage biotechnology company with its headquarters in Malvern, Pennsylvania. Founded in 2008 as QR Pharma, it develops buntanetap, formerly known as posiphen, an oral drug candidate intended to reduce production of proteins associated with neurodegeneration, including amyloid precursor protein and alpha-synuclein, by blocking translation of their messenger RNA. The company has tested the drug in Alzheimer's disease and Parkinson's disease, and in 2026 it was conducting a phase 3 trial in early Alzheimer's disease. Several of its trials missed their primary endpoints, and trade publications criticised the way the company presented the results.

== History ==
The company's lead compound originated in the intramural research program of the National Institutes of Health, where posiphen and its mirror-image form, phenserine, were developed before being licensed to Axonyx. After Axonyx merged with TorreyPines Therapeutics, TorreyPines licensed posiphen to QR Pharma in 2008. QR Pharma was founded that year by Maria Maccecchini, who had earlier built and sold a company also named Annovis. It stopped work on phenserine, which had failed in phase III development, in 2009 and continued with posiphen. Its early funding came from angel investors and state-backed technology funds, including Ben Franklin Technology Partners. Grants from the Michael J. Fox Foundation in 2012 and the United States Army in 2013 supported research on posiphen in Parkinson's disease and traumatic brain injury.

== Buntanetap ==
Buntanetap is the (+) enantiomer of phenserine. Unlike phenserine, it does not inhibit acetylcholinesterase. In cell cultures and mouse models, both compounds lowered levels of amyloid precursor protein and amyloid beta by acting on a regulatory sequence in the precursor protein's messenger RNA and blocking its translation. Posiphen was also found to block translation of alpha-synuclein through a similar element, and reviewers have described it as a candidate drug for both Alzheimer's and Parkinson's disease. A 2023 review of tau-targeting therapies described buntanetap as inhibiting the synthesis of alpha-synuclein, tau and amyloid precursor protein, and noted that Annovis was developing it for both diseases.

== Clinical development ==
Annovis's late-stage trials have drawn scrutiny over their choice of endpoints and the company's emphasis on subgroup results. Fierce Biotech included the company in its year-end list of the biotechnology industry's missteps of 2024, citing its presentation of both its Alzheimer's and Parkinson's readouts that year.

=== Alzheimer's disease ===
A phase 1/2 trial that QR Pharma began in March 2017, run by the Alzheimer's Disease Cooperative Study at five academic centres in the United States, measured whether posiphen changed the rate of amyloid beta synthesis in people with early Alzheimer's disease. The trial was completed in December 2021. Posiphen did not alter amyloid beta synthesis, cognitive measures or cerebrospinal fluid biomarkers compared with placebo.

In May 2021 Annovis reported interim results from a small phase 2a study of posiphen, then designated ANVS401, in people with Alzheimer's or Parkinson's disease. The announcement came shortly before the FDA approved aducanumab, and the shares of several companies working on Alzheimer's disease rose in the following weeks. Annovis's share price more than quadrupled by mid-July. When fuller results were presented at the Alzheimer's Association International Conference that July, the company said the drug had improved cognition by 30 percent within 25 days. Fierce Biotech reported that the data appeared to show no advantage over placebo on most measures, and that the trial's registered primary outcome was the incidence of adverse events. The cognitive results were not statistically significant, and the shares fell about 60 percent the following day.

A phase 2/3 trial began in April 2023. It enrolled 353 people with mild to moderate Alzheimer's disease, diagnosed clinically without biomarker confirmation, and treated them for three months. Results reported in April 2024 showed no statistically significant effect on the trial's primary goals. The company highlighted an improvement on a cognitive scale in about 90 participants with mild disease and biomarker evidence of Alzheimer's, a subgroup analysis that had not been pre-specified. Blood testing after the trial was unblinded found that 202 of the 325 participants who completed it had biomarkers consistent with Alzheimer's disease. The company's shares fell by as much as 60 percent on the day of the announcement.

In a post-trial analysis, Annovis concluded that about 40 percent of participants in the 2024 study, all recruited at sites in the Miami area, did not have Alzheimer's disease, and excluded their data. Science reported this in January 2026 as part of an investigation into alleged data falsification at clinical trial sites in South Florida. Maccecchini told the magazine that the sites concerned had offered volunteers cash and refreshments and that some participants had feigned cognitive impairment in order to enroll. The company said the problem had set back development of buntanetap by years.

A phase 3 trial began in February 2025. It enrolls people with early Alzheimer's disease whose blood levels of p-tau217 are consistent with amyloid pathology, and compares 30 mg of buntanetap daily with placebo on measures of cognition and daily functioning after six and eighteen months of treatment.

=== Parkinson's disease and related dementias ===
A phase 3 trial in early Parkinson's disease began in August 2022. It compared daily doses of 10 mg and 20 mg with placebo over six months at about 100 sites in the United States and Europe, and enrolled 523 participants. Results expected in January 2024 were postponed, with the company citing ongoing data cleaning. Before the data were released, Annovis changed the primary endpoint from parts II and III of the MDS-UPDRS rating scale to part II alone, citing feedback from the FDA.

The results were released in July 2024. Annovis reported statistically significant improvements in subgroups, including 158 participants who had been diagnosed more than three years earlier, and a cognitive benefit at the higher dose. Fierce Biotech wrote that the announcement did not address whether the drug had met its main goal in the full trial population, and noted that none of the trial's registered secondary endpoints related to cognition. The trial missed its primary endpoint in the overall study population.

Later analyses presented by the company at conferences in 2025 focused on participants with mild dementia. An assessment by the analytics firm GlobalData described the results in that group as promising. Annovis then sought a meeting with the FDA about a trial in Parkinson's disease dementia and dementia with Lewy bodies. In 2026, the company described a study in Parkinson's disease dementia as in preparation. A three-year open-label safety study of buntanetap in Parkinson's disease, planned to enrol 500 patients, began in January 2026.
