= C15H23NO2S =

The molecular formula C_{15}H_{23}NO_{2}S (molar mass: 281.41 g/mol, exact mass: 281.1450 u) may refer to:

- OSU-6162 (PNU-96391)
- Pridopidine (PL-101)
