= C22H26O4 =

The molecular formula C_{22}H_{26}O_{4} may refer to:

- AM-1714
- Cannabinolic acid
- Hexestrol diacetate
- Seratrodast
- Vutiglabridin
