= Naxagolide =

Clinical data
- Other names: Dopazinol; Nazagolide; PHNO; (+)-PHNO; (+)-4-Propyl-9-hydroxynaphthoxazine; 4-Propyl-9-hydroxy-1,2,3,4a,5,6-hexahydronaphthoxazine; L-647339; L647339; MK-458; MK458
- Routes of administration: Oral; Transdermal
- Drug class: Dopamine D_{2} and D_{3} receptor agonist; Antiparkinsonian agent

Identifiers
- IUPAC name: (4aR,10bR)-4-propyl-2,3,4a,5,6,10b-hexahydrobenzo[h][1,4]benzoxazin-9-ol
- CAS Number: 88058-88-2
- PubChem CID: 57533
- ChemSpider: 51863
- UNII: 22Z7E0X6OF
- ChEBI: CHEBI:177372
- ChEMBL: ChEMBL69271
- CompTox Dashboard (EPA): DTXSID60236782

Chemical and physical data
- Formula: C_{15}H_{21}NO_{2}
- Molar mass: 247.338 g·mol^{−1}
- 3D model (JSmol): Interactive image
- SMILES: CCCN1CCO[C@H]2[C@H]1CCC3=C2C=C(C=C3)O
- InChI: InChI=1S/C15H21NO2/c1-2-7-16-8-9-18-15-13-10-12(17)5-3-11(13)4-6-14(15)16/h3,5,10,14-15,17H,2,4,6-9H2,1H3/t14-,15-/m1/s1; Key:JCSREICEMHWFAY-HUUCEWRRSA-N

Naxagolide (INN), also known as PHNO, dopazinol, L-647339, and MK-458 among other synonyms, is a dopamine receptor agonist which was developed for the treatment of Parkinson's disease but was never marketed. A radiolabeled form has been used for brain imaging. The drug was developed for use both orally and transdermally.

It acts as a potent dopamine D_{2} and D_{3} receptor agonist. Naxagolide was described in the 1990s as the most potent dopamine D_{2} receptor agonist that had been used. It shows about 50-fold selectivity for the dopamine D_{3} receptor over the dopamine D_{2} receptor (K_{i} = 0.16 nM vs. 8.5 nM). The drug is a naphthoxazine derivative. It is structurally similar to ergolines such as pergolide and cabergoline but is a non-ergoline itself.

Naxagolide was first described in 1984 and was under development by Merck & Co in the 1980s and 1990s. It was developed for treatment of Parkinson's disease and reached phase 2 clinical trials for this indication. The drug was discontinued due to inadequate effectiveness and/or due to toxicity.

== See also ==
- List of investigational Parkinson's disease drugs
- S32504
- Adrogolide
- Quinagolide
