= C26H31N3O2 =

The molecular formula C_{26}H_{31}N_{3}O_{2} (molar mass : 417.553 g/mol) may refer to:

- BP-897
- 1cP-AL-LAD
