= C16H22N2O2 =

The molecular formula C_{16}H_{22}N_{2}O_{2} (molar mass: 274.36 g/mol) may refer to:

- 4-Acetoxy-DET
- 4-Acetoxy-MPT
- 4-Acetoxy-MiPT
- 4-PrO-MET
- S32504
- Isamoltane (CGP-361A)
