= Pardoprunox =

Antiparkinsonian drug

Clinical data
- Routes of administration: Oral
- ATC code: none

Legal status
- Legal status: In general: uncontrolled

Identifiers
- IUPAC name: 7-(4-methylpiperazin-1-yl)-3H-1,3-benzoxazol-2-one
- CAS Number: 269718-84-5
- PubChem CID: 6918524
- ChemSpider: 5293721
- UNII: 5R72CHP32S
- CompTox Dashboard (EPA): DTXSID80949746
- ECHA InfoCard: 100.206.783

Chemical and physical data
- Formula: C_{12}H_{15}N_{3}O_{2}
- Molar mass: 233.271 g·mol^{−1}
- 3D model (JSmol): Interactive image
- SMILES: Cl.O=C2Oc1c(cccc1N2)N3CCN(C)CC3

Pardoprunox (INN; code name SLV-308) is an antiparkinsonian drug developed by Solvay for the treatment of Parkinson's disease that reached phase III clinical trials before being discontinued. It was also being investigated for the treatment of depression and anxiety but these indications appear to have been abandoned as well.

Pardoprunox acts as a D_{2} (pK_{i} = 8.1) and D_{3} receptor (pK_{i} = 8.6) partial agonist (IA = 50% and 67%, respectively) and 5-HT_{1A} receptor (pK_{i} = 8.5) full agonist (IA = 100%). It also binds to D_{4} (pK_{i} = 7.8), α_{1}-adrenergic (pK_{i} = 7.8), α_{2}-adrenergic (pK_{i} = 7.4), and 5-HT_{7} receptors (pK_{i} = 7.2) with lower affinity. Relative to other dopaminergic antiparkinsonian agents, pardoprunox is thought to have significantly less of a propensity for inducing certain side effects like dyskinesia and psychosis.

== See also ==
- List of investigational Parkinson's disease drugs
- Aripiprazole
- Bifeprunox
