= Davunetide =

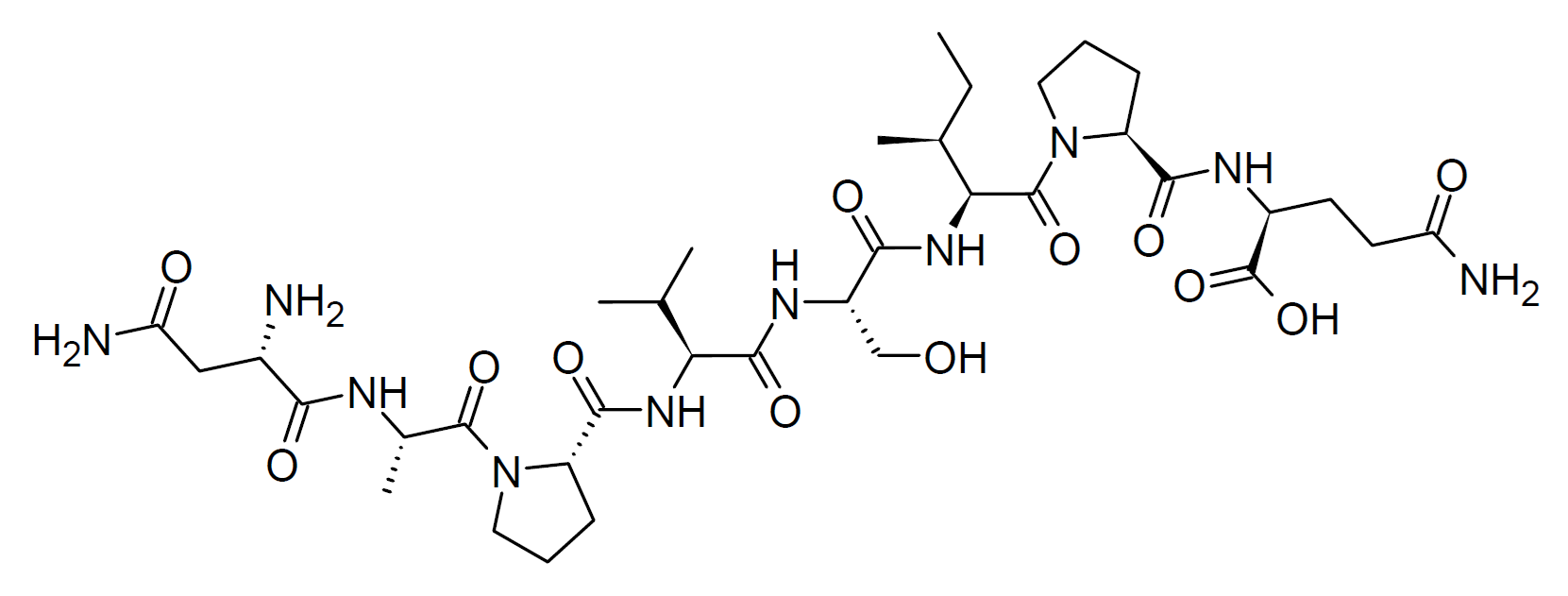

Identifiers
- IUPAC name: (2S)-5-amino-2-[[(2S)-1-[(2S,3S)-2-[[(2S)-2-[[(2S)-2-[[(2S)-1-[(2S)-2-[[(2S)-2,4-diamino-4-oxobutanoyl]amino]propanoyl]pyrrolidine-2-carbonyl]amino]-3-methylbutanoyl]amino]-3-hydroxypropanoyl]amino]-3-methylpentanoyl]pyrrolidine-2-carbonyl]amino]-5-oxopentanoic acid
- CAS Number: 211439-12-2
- PubChem CID: 9832404
- UNII: GF00K3IIWE

Chemical and physical data
- Formula: C_{36}H_{60}N_{10}O_{12}
- Molar mass: 824.934 g·mol^{−1}
- 3D model (JSmol): Interactive image
- SMILES: CC[C@H](C)[C@@H](C(=O)N1CCC[C@H]1C(=O)N[C@@H](CCC(=O)N)C(=O)O)NC(=O)[C@H](CO)NC(=O)[C@H](C(C)C)NC(=O)[C@@H]2CCCN2C(=O)[C@H](C)NC(=O)[C@H](CC(=O)N)N
- InChI: InChI=1S/C36H60N10O12/c1-6-18(4)28(35(56)46-14-8-9-23(46)31(52)41-21(36(57)58)11-12-25(38)48)44-30(51)22(16-47)42-33(54)27(17(2)3)43-32(53)24-10-7-13-45(24)34(55)19(5)40-29(50)20(37)15-26(39)49/h17-24,27-28,47H,6-16,37H2,1-5H3,(H2,38,48)(H2,39,49)(H,40,50)(H,41,52)(H,42,54)(H,43,53)(H,44,51)(H,57,58)/t18-,19-,20-,21-,22-,23-,24-,27-,28-/m0/s1; Key:DWLTUUXCVGVRAV-XWRHUKJGSA-N

Davunetide (Asn-Ala-Pro-Val-Ser-Ile-Pro-Gln, CP201) is a octapeptide derivative with the amino acid sequence NAPVSIPQ. It has antiinflammatory and neuroprotective effects and has been investigated for several conditions including schizophrenia and Alzheimer's Disease.

== See also ==
- List of investigational antipsychotics
- List of investigational Parkinson's disease drugs
