= Bifeprunox =

Experimental dopamine D2 receptor partial agonist researched as an antipsychotic agent

Clinical data
- ATC code: none

Identifiers
- IUPAC name: 7-[4-(biphenyl-3-ylmethyl)piperazin-1-yl]-1,3-benzoxazol-2(3H)-one
- CAS Number: 350992-10-8
- PubChem CID: 208951
- ChemSpider: 181044
- UNII: AP69E83Z79
- ChEMBL: ChEMBL218166
- CompTox Dashboard (EPA): DTXSID80188592

Chemical and physical data
- Formula: C_{24}H_{23}N_{3}O_{2}
- Molar mass: 385.467 g·mol^{−1}
- 3D model (JSmol): Interactive image
- SMILES: O=C2Oc1c(cccc1N2)N5CCN(Cc4cccc(c3ccccc3)c4)CC5
- InChI: InChI=1S/C24H23N3O2/c28-24-25-21-10-5-11-22(23(21)29-24)27-14-12-26(13-15-27)17-18-6-4-9-20(16-18)19-7-2-1-3-8-19/h1-11,16H,12-15,17H2,(H,25,28); Key:CYGODHVAJQTCBG-UHFFFAOYSA-N

Bifeprunox (INN; code name DU-127,090) is an atypical antipsychotic which, similarly to aripiprazole, combines minimal D_{2} receptor agonism with serotonin receptor agonism. It was under development for the treatment of schizophrenia, psychosis, and Parkinson's disease.

In a multi-center, placebo-controlled study, 20 mg of bifeprunox was found to be significantly more effective than placebo at reducing symptoms of schizophrenia, with a low incidence of side effects. An NDA for Bifeprunox was filed with the U.S. Food and Drug Administration in January 2007. The FDA rejected the application in August 2007. In June 2009, Solvay and Wyeth decided to cease development because "efficacy data did not support pursuing the existing development strategy of stabilisation of non-acute patients with schizophrenia."

== Pharmacodynamics ==
Bifeprunox is an atypical antipsychotic that is a partial D2 agonist.

== See also ==
- List of investigational antipsychotics
- List of investigational bipolar disorder drugs
- List of investigational Parkinson's disease drugs
- Aripiprazole
- Pardoprunox
