= Solengepras =

Clinical data
- Other names: Solangepras (former proposed INN); CVN-424; CVN424
- Routes of administration: Oral
- Drug class: GPR6 inverse agonist

Identifiers
- IUPAC name: 1-[2-[4-(2,4-difluorophenoxy)piperidin-1-yl]-3-[[(3R)-oxolan-3-yl]amino]-7,8-dihydro-5H-pyrido[3,4-b]pyrazin-6-yl]ethanone
- CAS Number: 2254706-21-1
- PubChem CID: 137359492
- DrugBank: DB18958
- ChemSpider: 114869317
- UNII: XO01711URG
- KEGG: D12980
- ChEMBL: ChEMBL4778540

Chemical and physical data
- Formula: C_{24}H_{29}F_{2}N_{5}O_{3}
- Molar mass: 473.525 g·mol^{−1}
- 3D model (JSmol): Interactive image
- SMILES: CC(=O)N1CCC2=C(C1)N=C(C(=N2)N3CCC(CC3)OC4=C(C=C(C=C4)F)F)N[C@@H]5CCOC5
- InChI: InChI=1S/C24H29F2N5O3/c1-15(32)31-10-6-20-21(13-31)28-23(27-17-7-11-33-14-17)24(29-20)30-8-4-18(5-9-30)34-22-3-2-16(25)12-19(22)26/h2-3,12,17-18H,4-11,13-14H2,1H3,(H,27,28)/t17-/m1/s1; Key:HSWVJQBEXRKOBZ-QGZVFWFLSA-N

Solengepras (INN, USAN, developmental code name CVN-424), is an inverse agonist of the orphan G protein-coupled receptor 6 (GPR6) which is under development for the treatment of Parkinson's disease. It is a small molecule and is taken orally. Solengepras produces hyperlocomotion and reverses haloperidol-induced catalepsy in rodents. It is being developed by Cerevance. As of March 2026, solengepras is in phase 3 clinical trials for Parkinson's disease. Positive results of phase 3 trials were released in October 2026.

The drug was initially assigned the proposed INN solangepras in 2025. The name was subsequently corrected to solengepras, which was established as the recommended INN in September 2026.

== See also ==
- List of investigational Parkinson's disease drugs
