= Lu AF28996 =

Clinical data
- Other names: Lu-AF28996; LuAF28996; Lu-AF-28996
- Routes of administration: Oral
- Drug class: Dopamine receptor agonist; Dopamine D_{1}-like and D_{2}-like receptor agonist; Antiparkinsonian agent

Lu AF28996 is a dual dopamine D_{1}-like and D_{2}-like receptor agonist which is under development for the treatment of Parkinson's disease. It is taken orally. The drug is a prodrug that is reversibly converted into an active form. Lu AF28996 was first described in the scientific literature by 2021. It is under development by Lundbeck. As of April 2025, the drug is in phase 1 clinical trials. The chemical structure of Lu AF28996 does not yet appear to have been disclosed.

== See also ==
- List of investigational Parkinson's disease drugs
