= Xaliproden =

Chemical compound

Clinical data
- Trade names: Xaprila (former tentative)
- Other names: Xaliprodene; SR-57746; SR57746; SR-57,746; SR-57746A; SR57746A
- Routes of administration: Oral
- Drug class: Serotonin 5-HT_{1A} receptor agonist
- ATC code: N07XX03 (WHO)

Identifiers
- IUPAC name: 1-[2-(2-naphthyl)ethyl]-4-[3-(trifluoromethyl)phenyl]-1,2,3,6-tetrahydropyridine
- CAS Number: 135354-02-8
- PubChem CID: 128919
- ChemSpider: 114237
- UNII: V8QL94KNQO
- KEGG: D06327
- CompTox Dashboard (EPA): DTXSID9048306

Chemical and physical data
- Formula: C_{24}H_{22}F_{3}N
- Molar mass: 381.442 g·mol^{−1}
- 3D model (JSmol): Interactive image
- SMILES: FC(F)(F)c4cccc(/C3=C/CN(CCc2cc1ccccc1cc2)CC3)c4
- InChI: InChI=1S/C24H22F3N/c25-24(26,27)23-7-3-6-22(17-23)20-11-14-28(15-12-20)13-10-18-8-9-19-4-1-2-5-21(19)16-18/h1-9,11,16-17H,10,12-15H2; Key:WJJYZXPHLSLMGE-UHFFFAOYSA-N

Xaliproden (developmental code names SR-57746 and SR-57746A) is a serotonin 5-HT_{1A} receptor agonist which was under development for the treatment of Alzheimer's disease, amyotrophic lateral sclerosis (ALS), cancer pain, and multiple sclerosis but was never marketed. It is taken orally.

The drug acts as a selective and potent full agonist of the serotonin 5-HT_{1A} receptor. However, it also shows much lower affinity for sigma receptors. Xaliproden produces neurotrophic and neuroprotective effects in preclinical research. It also fully substitutes for the serotonin 5-HT_{1A} receptor full agonist 8-OH-DPAT in rodent drug discrimination tests and produces antidepressant-like, anxiolytic-like, antiaggressive, and analgesic effects in rodents. The drug efficiently crosses the blood–brain barrier in rodents.

Side effects of xaliproden in humans include diarrhea, nausea, vomiting, insomnia, dizziness, vertigo, asthenia or fatigue, paresthesia, tinnitus, and anxiety.

Development of xaliproden for Alzheimer's disease and ALS was discontinued in 2007 following analysis of Phase III data. In addition development for cancer pain was discontinued in 2009. The drug showed an effect on hippocampal volume that suggested slowing of atrophy in clinical trials of people with Alzheimer's disease. However, there was insufficient clinical evidence for effectiveness in counteracting Alzheimer's disease-related cognitive decline. Similarly, while there were some indicators of effectiveness in ALS, including a small but clinically noteworthy effect on some functional parameters, the overall benefit did not reach statistical significance when results across several Phase III trials were averaged.

Paliroden (SR-57667; SR-57667B), an analogue of xaliproden, was also investigated for treatment of Alzheimer's disease and Parkinson's disease, and reached phase 2 trials for these indications, but development was likewise discontinued.

== See also ==
- Substituted naphthylethylamine
- Cyclized phenethylamine
- Paliroden
