= Buntanetap =

Chemical compound

Clinical data
- Trade names: Posiphen, ANVS-401
- Routes of administration: By mouth

Legal status
- Legal status: Investigational

Identifiers
- IUPAC name: [(3aS,8bR)-3,4,8b-trimethyl-2,3a-dihydro-1H-pyrrolo[2,3-b]indol-7-yl] N-phenylcarbamate
- CAS Number: 159652-53-6
- PubChem CID: 11249342
- DrugBank: DB15317
- ChemSpider: 9424375
- UNII: Z0O4TJ588O
- KEGG: D12318
- ChEMBL: ChEMBL4297417
- CompTox Dashboard (EPA): DTXSID001110145

Chemical and physical data
- Formula: C_{20}H_{23}N_{3}O_{2}
- Molar mass: 337.423 g·mol^{−1}
- 3D model (JSmol): Interactive image
- SMILES: C[C@]12CCN([C@H]1N(C3=C2C=C(C=C3)OC(=O)NC4=CC=CC=C4)C)C
- InChI: InChI=1S/C20H23N3O2/c1-20-11-12-22(2)18(20)23(3)17-10-9-15(13-16(17)20)25-19(24)21-14-7-5-4-6-8-14/h4-10,13,18H,11-12H2,1-3H3,(H,21,24)/t18-,20+/m0/s1; Key:PBHFNBQPZCRWQP-AZUAARDMSA-N

Buntanetap (formerly known as posiphen) is an orally-administered small molecule translational inhibitor of aggregating neurotoxic proteins that is under investigation for the treatment of neurodegenerative diseases such as Alzheimer's disease and Parkinson's disease. It is the (+)-enantiomer of phenserine, which lacks the acetylcholinesterase inhibitor activity of the (-)-enantiomer, enabling higher doses to be tolerated. It is currently in Phase 3 clinical trial for early Alzheimer's disease and in the Open-Label Extension (OLE) study for Parkinson's disease.

== History ==
The history of discovery of buntanetap traces back to physostigmine, an alkaloid found in the seeds of an African plant Calabar bean. Due to its ability to inhibit cholinesterase, physostigmine was among the first agents to be tested for Alzheimer's disease, but it had a short-lived effect and was highly toxic.

To overcome these limitations, scientists developed a phenylcarbamate analog of physostigmine - phenserine - with more favorable pharmacological properties. It had reduced peripheral toxicity, longer duration, and higher brain permeability. Phenserine was tested in a large clinical trial in Alzheimer's participants by company Axonyx but revealed no statistically significant improvement form placebo. However, in addition to its acetylcholinesterase inhibiting activity, phenserine was reported to reduce amyloid - the hallmark neurotoxic protein in Alzheimer's brains. Additional work led to the discovery of posiphen (later named buntanetap) - a (+)-enantiomer of phenserine that lacks cholinesterase inhibiting activity but can still decrease the toxic protein aggregates, minimizing gastrointestinal side effects and allowing for the use of higher doses.

In June 2006, Axonyx and TorreyPines Therapeutics announced plans for a merger agreement that consolidated their CNS-focused assets. Two years later, in November 2008, TorreyPines granted QR Pharma (later Annovis Bio) worldwide rights to develop and commercialize phenserine, posiphen, and related compounds. The name of the drug was changed to buntanetap - assigned by USAN as IUPAC nomenclature to differentiate its distinct mechanism and developmental path from the predecessors.

== Development ==
Different from monoclonal antibody therapies, buntanetap is an orally available small molecule with a unique mechanism of action: it inhibits the translation of multiple neurotoxic proteins at once, including amyloid precursor proteins (APP) and amyloid beta, tau, alpha-synuclein (αSYN), huntingtin, and TDP-43. Buntanetap performs in a noncholinergic manner and works specifically in the conditions of high iron influx, often seen in damaged nerve cells, which trigger the overproduction of neurotoxic proteins. Specifically, high iron concentration leads to the release of mRNAs coding for neurotoxic proteins from Iron Regulatory Protein 1 (IRP1), allowing the free mRNA to be translated by the ribosomes. High levels of neurotoxic proteins create a toxic cascade which results in faulty nerve cell functioning, impaired axonal transport and synaptic activity, and inflammation, eventually leading to nerve cell death. Buntanetap strengthens the binding of the mRNAs to IRP1, preventing them from being released and translated by the ribosome, thereby stopping translation and impeding the toxic cascade.

Buntanetap is safe and well-tolerated at doses even 8 times higher than the efficacious dose. In vivo, the levels of APP protein in the cortex were reduced by buntanetap with an ED50 of 20mg/kg (median Effective Dose). The β-secretase activity in the mouse brain also could be reduced with elevated doses of 35 and 50 mg/kg. Overall, the dose range from 10 mg to 160 mg of buntanetap is well tolerated and generally adopted in clinical uses. With higher doses, supralinear increase of plasma levels was shown, indicating the saturable metabolism, which is a factor related to toxicity. Studies have shown that plasma levels of buntanetap reducing brain Aβ levels are equal or greater in humans than mice. Once buntanetap is dosed over 160 mg, gastro-intestinal related symptoms including nausea and vomiting, were manifested. The drug additionally presents the rapid absorption rate, occurred within an hour or two.

== See also ==
- List of investigational Parkinson's disease drugs
