= Lu AE04621 =

Clinical data
- Other names: Lu-AE04621; Lu AE 04621; LuAE04621
- Routes of administration: Oral
- Drug class: Dopamine receptor agonist; Dopamine D_{1} and D_{2} receptor agonist
- ATC code: None

Lu AE04621 is a dopamine receptor agonist which is or was under development for the treatment of Parkinson's disease but has not been marketed. It is taken orally. The drug is said to be a prodrug of the catecholamine Lu AA40326 and to act as a dual dopamine D_{1} and D_{2} receptor agonist. Lu AE04621 is or was under development by Lundbeck. As of November 2023, it is in phase 1 clinical trials and has been since at least 2016, but no recent development has been reported since February 2019. The chemical structure of Lu AE04621 has not yet been disclosed. However, it may be a prodrug of 5,6-diOH-DPAT or a related approach.

== See also ==
- List of investigational Parkinson's disease drugs
