= IPT-803 =

Clinical data
- Other names: IPT803
- Routes of administration: Unspecified
- Drug class: Dopamine modulator; Opioid receptor antagonist
- ATC code: None

IPT-803 is a drug described as a dopamine modulator and opioid receptor antagonist which is or was under development for the treatment of Parkinson's disease. It is under development by Tools4Patient. The drug's exact mechanism of action is unclear, but may involve dopamine and endorphin pathways. As of June 2020, it is in phase 1/2 clinical trials. There have been no more recent developments since then. The chemical structure of IPT-803 does not yet appear to have been disclosed.

== See also ==
- List of investigational Parkinson's disease drugs
