= EHP-102 =

Clinical data
- Other names: EHP102; VCE-003.2; VCE003.2
- Routes of administration: Oral
- Drug class: Cannabinoid CB_{2} receptor agonist; PPARγ agonist

Identifiers
- IUPAC name: 3-[(2E)-3,7-dimethylocta-2,6-dienyl]-5-(ethylamino)-4-hydroxy-6-pentylcyclohexa-3,5-diene-1,2-dione
- CAS Number: 1807652-43-2
- PubChem CID: 91864651
- DrugBank: DB16933
- UNII: FDH1SMY691

Chemical and physical data
- Formula: C_{23}H_{35}NO_{3}
- Molar mass: 373.537 g·mol^{−1}
- 3D model (JSmol): Interactive image
- SMILES: CCCCCC1=C(C(=C(C(=O)C1=O)C/C=C(\C)/CCC=C(C)C)O)NCC
- InChI: InChI=1S/C23H35NO3/c1-6-8-9-13-18-20(24-7-2)21(25)19(23(27)22(18)26)15-14-17(5)12-10-11-16(3)4/h11,14,24-25H,6-10,12-13,15H2,1-5H3/b17-14+; Key:MRCQPMQBCKEOCU-SAPNQHFASA-N

EHP-102, also known as VCE-003.2, is a cannabinoid CB_{2} receptor agonist and PPARγ agonist which is under development for the treatment of Parkinson's disease and Huntington's disease. It is taken orally. The drug is a derivative of cannabigerol (CBG). It is under development by Emerald Health Sciences. As of February 2024, it is in the preclinical research stage of development for both Parkinson's disease and Huntington's disease, but no recent development has been reported for Huntington's disease.

== See also ==
- List of investigational Parkinson's disease drugs
