= A-86929 =

Chemical compound

Names
- Preferred IUPAC name (5aR,11bS)-2-Propyl-4,5,5a,6,7,11b-hexahydrobenzo[f]thieno[2,3-c]quinoline-9,10-diol

Identifiers
CAS Number	166591-11-3
3D model (JSmol)	Interactive image
ChEMBL	ChEMBL28338
ChemSpider	8017113
PubChem CID	9841398
UNII	69MG3OZA0H
CompTox Dashboard (EPA)	DTXSID501028589 DTXSID50938440, DTXSID501028589
- InChI: InChI=1S/C18H21NO2S/c1-2-3-11-7-13-17(22-11)9-19-14-5-4-10-6-15(20)16(21)8-12(10)18(13)14/h6-8,14,18-21H,2-5,9H2,1H3/t14-,18+/m1/s1 Key: REHAKLRYABHSQJ-KDOFPFPSSA-N; InChI=1/C18H21NO2S/c1-2-3-11-7-13-17(22-11)9-19-14-5-4-10-6-15(20)16(21)8-12(10)18(13)14/h6-8,14,18-21H,2-5,9H2,1H3/t14-,18+/m1/s1 Key: REHAKLRYABHSQJ-KDOFPFPSBO
- SMILES: Oc1cc3c(cc1O)CCC4C3c2cc(CCC)sc2CN4

Properties
Chemical formula	C_{18}H_{21}NO_{2}S
Molar mass	315.429 g/mol
- Except where otherwise noted, data are given for materials in their standard state (at 25 °C [77 °F], 100 kPa). verify (what is ?) Infobox references

A-86929 is a synthetic compound that acts as a selective dopamine receptor D_{1} agonist. It was developed as a possible treatment for Parkinson's disease, as well as for other applications such as treatment of cocaine addiction, but while it had reasonable efficacy in humans it also caused dyskinesias and has not been continued. It has mainly been used as its diacetate ester prodrug adrogolide (A-93431; ABT-431; DAS-431), which has better pharmacokinetics.

Adrogolide.

== See also ==
- List of investigational Parkinson's disease drugs
