= Tozadenant =

Clinical data
- Other names: RO4494351; RO-4494351; SYN-115; SYN115
- Routes of administration: Oral
- Drug class: Adenosine A_{2A} receptor antagonist; Antiparkinsonian agent
- ATC code: None

Pharmacokinetic data
- Elimination half-life: 15 hours

Identifiers
- IUPAC name: 4-hydroxy-N-(4-methoxy-7-morpholin-4-yl-1,3-benzothiazol-2-yl)-4-methylpiperidine-1-carboxamide
- CAS Number: 870070-55-6
- PubChem CID: 11618368
- IUPHAR/BPS: 5611
- DrugBank: DB12203
- ChemSpider: 9793117
- UNII: D9K857J81I
- KEGG: D10174
- ChEBI: CHEBI:177494
- ChEMBL: ChEMBL2105747
- PDB ligand: 9XW (PDBe, RCSB PDB)

Chemical and physical data
- Formula: C_{19}H_{26}N_{4}O_{4}S
- Molar mass: 406.50 g·mol^{−1}
- 3D model (JSmol): Interactive image
- SMILES: CC1(CCN(CC1)C(=O)NC2=NC3=C(C=CC(=C3S2)N4CCOCC4)OC)O
- InChI: InChI=1S/C19H26N4O4S/c1-19(25)5-7-23(8-6-19)18(24)21-17-20-15-14(26-2)4-3-13(16(15)28-17)22-9-11-27-12-10-22/h3-4,25H,5-12H2,1-2H3,(H,20,21,24); Key:XNBRWUQWSKXMPW-UHFFFAOYSA-N

Tozadenant (INN, USAN; developmental code names RO4494351 and SYN-115) is an adenosine A_{2A} receptor antagonist which was under development for the treatment of Parkinson's disease and liver disorders but was never marketed due to safety concerns. It is taken orally. Tozadenant was under development by Roche, Acorda Therapeutics, and Biotie Therapies. It reached phase 3 clinical trials for Parkinson's disease prior to the discontinuation of its development. The development of tozadenant was discontinued due to findings of agranulocytosis and associated serious adverse effects in clinical trials including five patient deaths.

== See also ==
- Adenosine receptor antagonist
- List of investigational Parkinson's disease drugs
