= S32504 =

Clinical data
- Other names: S-32504; S-32,504
- Routes of administration: Unspecified
- Drug class: Dopamine receptor agonist; Dopamine D_{2} and D_{3} receptor agonist
- ATC code: None

Identifiers
- IUPAC name: (4aR,10bR)-4-propyl-2,3,4a,5,6,10b-hexahydrobenzo[h][1,4]benzoxazine-9-carboxamide
- PubChem CID: 15389743
- ChemSpider: 21259074
- ChEMBL: ChEMBL484599

Chemical and physical data
- Formula: C_{16}H_{22}N_{2}O_{2}
- Molar mass: 274.364 g·mol^{−1}
- 3D model (JSmol): Interactive image
- SMILES: CCCN1CCO[C@H]2[C@H]1CCC3=C2C=C(C=C3)C(=O)N
- InChI: InChI=1S/C16H22N2O2/c1-2-7-18-8-9-20-15-13-10-12(16(17)19)4-3-11(13)5-6-14(15)18/h3-4,10,14-15H,2,5-9H2,1H3,(H2,17,19)/t14-,15-/m1/s1; Key:XKTRZPQOQOCNJU-HUUCEWRRSA-N

S32504 is a dopamine D_{2} and D_{3} receptor agonist which was under development for the treatment of Parkinson's disease but was never marketed. Its route of administration was unspecified.

== Pharmacology ==
=== Pharmacodynamics ===
S32504 acts as a potent and selective agonist of the dopamine D_{3} and D_{2} receptors, with EC_{50} values of 2.0–3.2 nM and 2.5–398 nM, respectively, depending on the assay. It is a preferential agonist of the dopamine D_{3} receptor over the dopamine D_{2} receptor. The drug showed little affinity for or activity at more than 50 other receptors and targets, including the dopamine D_{1}, D_{4}, and D_{5} receptors and the serotonin 5-HT_{1A} and 5-HT_{2A} receptors, among others. S32504 suppressed the activity of dopaminergic neurons in the ventral tegmental area (VTA) in rodents. In addition, it potently reduced levels of dopamine in the striatum, nucleus accumbens, and frontal cortex, which could be reversed by the dopamine D_{2} and D_{3} receptor antagonist haloperidol and by the selective dopamine D_{2} receptor antagonist L-741,626, but not by the selective dopamine D_{3} receptor antagonist S33084.

The drug produces antiparkinsonian effects in rodents and monkeys and antidepressant- and anxiolytic-like effects in rodents. The antiparkinsonian effects of S32504 could be blocked by the dopamine D_{2} and D_{3} receptor antagonists haloperidol and raclopride and by L-741,626, but not by S33084, suggesting mediation of these actions by the dopamine D_{2} receptor and not by the dopamine D_{3} receptor. However, the dopamine D_{3} receptor appeared to be involved in dopaminergic neuroprotective effects of S32504. The antidepressant- and anxiolytic-like effects of S32504 were blocked by haloperidol, raclopride, and L-741,626 but not by S33084, again suggesting involvement of the dopamine D_{2} receptor and not the dopamine D_{3} receptor in these effects. In rats treated with the dopamine depleting agent reserpine and monkeys treated with the dopaminergic neurotoxin MPTP, S32504 reversed hypolocomotion. Conversely, in untreated rodents, S32504 produced hypolocomotion over a wide range of doses and did not produce hyperlocomotion at any assessed dose.

== Chemistry ==
=== Analogues ===
Analogues of S32504 with enhanced affinity and selectivity for the dopamine D_{3} receptor over the dopamine D_{2} receptor have been developed and described.

== History ==
S32504 was first described in the scientific literature by 1999.

== Research ==
S32504 was being developed for the treatment of Parkinson's disease by Servier in France. It reached the preclinical research stage of development prior to its development being discontinued. No recent development was reported by 2003.

== See also ==
- List of investigational Parkinson's disease drugs
- Partial ergoline
- Naxagolide
- BP-897
