= SAGE-324 =

Chemical compound

Clinical data
- Other names: BIIB124

Legal status
- Legal status: Investigational

Identifiers
- IUPAC name: 1-[(3R,5S,8R,9R,10S,13S,14S,17S)-3-Hydroxy-3-(methoxymethyl)-13-methyl-2,4,5,6,7,8,9,10,11,12,14,15,16,17-tetradecahydro-1H-cyclopenta[a]phenanthren-17-yl]-2-(5-methyltetrazol-2-yl)ethanone
- CAS Number: 1832596-09-4
- PubChem CID: 118548467
- UNII: 9J768D78HM

Chemical and physical data
- Formula: C_{24}H_{38}N_{4}O_{3}
- Molar mass: 430.593 g·mol^{−1}
- 3D model (JSmol): Interactive image
- SMILES: CC1=NN(N=N1)CC(=O)[C@H]2CC[C@@H]3[C@@]2(CC[C@H]4[C@H]3CC[C@@H]5[C@@H]4CC[C@@](C5)(COC)O)C
- InChI: InChI=1S/C24H38N4O3/c1-15-25-27-28(26-15)13-22(29)21-7-6-20-19-5-4-16-12-24(30,14-31-3)11-9-17(16)18(19)8-10-23(20,21)2/h16-21,30H,4-14H2,1-3H3/t16-,17-,18+,19+,20-,21+,23-,24+/m0/s1; Key:QILSKKMYIGWGLH-YRTSKKSESA-N

SAGE-324, also known as BIIB124, is an experimental drug. It is a neurosteroid that works as a GABA_{A} receptor positive allosteric modulator.

SAGE-324 was being developed by Biogen for the treatment of essential tremor. Its development was discontinued in 2024 due to lack of efficacy in Phase 2 clinical trials.

== See also ==
- List of investigational Parkinson's disease drugs
