= Paliroden =

Clinical data
- Other names: SR-57667; SR57667; SR-57667B; SR57667B
- Routes of administration: Oral
- ATC code: None

Identifiers
- IUPAC name: 1-[2-(4-phenylphenyl)ethyl]-4-[3-(trifluoromethyl)phenyl]-3,6-dihydro-2H-pyridine
- CAS Number: 188396-77-2
- PubChem CID: 11567682
- DrugBank: DB05454
- ChemSpider: 9742452
- UNII: 17VJ76L90T
- ChEBI: CHEBI:752849
- ChEMBL: ChEMBL2107767
- CompTox Dashboard (EPA): DTXSID60870180

Chemical and physical data
- Formula: C_{26}H_{24}F_{3}N
- Molar mass: 407.480 g·mol^{−1}
- 3D model (JSmol): Interactive image
- SMILES: C1CN(CC=C1C2=CC(=CC=C2)C(F)(F)F)CCC3=CC=C(C=C3)C4=CC=CC=C4
- InChI: InChI=1S/C26H24F3N/c27-26(28,29)25-8-4-7-24(19-25)23-14-17-30(18-15-23)16-13-20-9-11-22(12-10-20)21-5-2-1-3-6-21/h1-12,14,19H,13,15-18H2; Key:CNEWKIDCGDXBDE-UHFFFAOYSA-N

Paliroden (INN; developmental code names SR-57667 and SR-57667B) is a drug which was under development for the treatment of Alzheimer's disease and Parkinson's disease but was never marketed. It is taken orally. The exact mechanism of action of the drug does not appear to have been disclosed, but it has been found to stimulate neurogenesis in preclinical research. It was under development by sanofi-aventis. Paliroden reached phase 2 clinical trials for Alzheimer's disease and Parkinson's disease prior to the discontinuation of its development in 2007. It is an analogue and follow-on drug of xaliproden (SR-57746; SR-57746A), which is a serotonin 5-HT_{1A} receptor agonist and neurogenesis stimulant that reached phase 3 trials for similar indications but also did not complete development.

== See also ==
- Cyclized phenethylamine
- List of investigational Parkinson's disease drugs
- Xaliproden
