= Emrusolmin =

Clinical data
- Other names: Anle138b, TEV-56286

Legal status
- Legal status: Investigational

Identifiers
- IUPAC name: 5-(1,3-benzodioxol-5-yl)-3-(3-bromophenyl)-1H-pyrazole
- CAS Number: 882697-00-9
- PubChem CID: 44608289
- DrugBank: DB13927
- ChemSpider: 58825097
- UNII: E7WRA77JET
- KEGG: D80685
- ChEBI: CHEBI:232606
- ChEMBL: ChEMBL4748063

Chemical and physical data
- Formula: C_{16}H_{11}BrN_{2}O_{2}
- Molar mass: 343.180 g·mol^{−1}
- 3D model (JSmol): Interactive image
- SMILES: C1OC2=C(O1)C=C(C=C2)C3=CC(=NN3)C4=CC(=CC=C4)Br
- InChI: InChI=InChI=1S/C16H11BrN2O2/c17-12-3-1-2-10(6-12)13-8-14(19-18-13)11-4-5-15-16(7-11)21-9-20-15/h1-8H,9H2,(H,18,19); Key:RCQIIBJSUWYYFU-UHFFFAOYSA-N

Emrusolmin (development code Anle138b) is an experimental drug for the treatment of neurodegenerative diseases. It is an inhibitor of protein aggregation, particularly preventing the aggregation of α-synuclein which is implicated in the development of Parkinson's disease. Other proteins it inhibits the aggregation of include tau which is associated with Alzheimer's disease (AD) and tauopathy, and amyloid beta which is associated with AD.

It is currently in clinical trials for Parkinson's disease and multiple system atrophy.

== See also ==
- List of investigational Parkinson's disease drugs
