= Pegipanermin =

Experiment TNFα inhibitor

Clinical data
- Other names: DN-TNF; INB-03; INB03; XENP345; XENP-345; XENP-1595; XENP1595; XPro-1595; XPro1595; XPro; XProTM; Soluble tumour necrosis factor inhibitor; Quellor; LIVNate
- Routes of administration: Subcutaneous injection

Identifiers
- CAS Number: 2489785-77-3
- PubChem SID: 497620581
- UNII: BM6T2K8FIN
- KEGG: D12168
- ChEMBL: ChEMBL4802208

Pegipanermin (USAN; developmental code names and proposed brand names DN-TNF, INB-03, LIVNate, Quellor XENP345, XPro1595) is a tumor necrosis factor α (TNFα) inhibitor which is under development for the treatment of Alzheimer's disease, mild cognitive impairment, major depressive disorder, and other indications. It is described as having potential anti-inflammatory effects. It is administered by subcutaneous injection.

The drug is a protein and PEGylated variant of TNFα that does not bind to the tumor necrosis factor receptors (TNF receptors) but instead binds to and forms heterotrimers with TNFα and prevents TNFα from activating the TNF receptors. However, pegipanermin is said to be selective for blocking TNFα activation of the tumor necrosis factor receptor 1 (TNFR1) but not of the tumor necrosis factor receptor 2 (TNFR2). Whereas the non-selective TNFα inhibitor etanercept suppressed hippocampal neurogenesis, learning, and memory in animals, pegipanermin did not do so, yet still inhibited neuroinflammation. Pegipanermin crosses the blood–brain barrier into the central nervous system.

As of October 2024, pegipanermin is in phase 2 clinical trials for Alzheimer's disease, mild cognitive impairment, and major depressive disorder. It is in the preclinical stage of development for HER2-positive breast cancer. No recent development has been reported for other neurodegenerative disorders, non-alcoholic steatohepatitis, or solid tumors. Development was discontinued for Parkinson's disease and COVID-19 respiratory infections.

== See also ==
- List of investigational antidepressants
- List of investigational Parkinson's disease drugs
- Infliximab
