= Ordopidine =

Clinical data
- Other names: ACR325; ACR-325
- Routes of administration: Oral
- Drug class: Atypical dopamine D_{2} receptor antagonist; Dopaminergic stabilizer
- ATC code: None

Identifiers
- IUPAC name: 1-ethyl-4-(2-fluoro-3-methylsulfonylphenyl)piperidine
- CAS Number: 871351-60-9
- PubChem CID: 11701939
- DrugBank: DB05196
- ChemSpider: 9876664
- UNII: 0P43SIA7J6
- ChEMBL: ChEMBL3545010
- CompTox Dashboard (EPA): DTXSID60236146

Chemical and physical data
- Formula: C_{14}H_{20}FNO_{2}S
- Molar mass: 285.38 g·mol^{−1}
- 3D model (JSmol): Interactive image
- SMILES: CCN1CCC(CC1)C2=C(C(=CC=C2)S(=O)(=O)C)F
- InChI: InChI=1S/C14H20FNO2S/c1-3-16-9-7-11(8-10-16)12-5-4-6-13(14(12)15)19(2,17)18/h4-6,11H,3,7-10H2,1-2H3; Key:UKUPJASJNQDHPH-UHFFFAOYSA-N

Ordopidine (INN; developmental code ACR-325) is an atypical dopamine D_{2} receptor antagonist and so-called "dopaminergic stabilizer" which is or was under development for the treatment of Parkinson's disease and bipolar disorder. It is taken orally.

The drug acts as a competitive low-affinity dopamine D_{2} receptor antagonist with a fast dissociation rate in vitro. It inhibits dextroamphetamine-induced hyperlocomotion in rodents but has little effect on locomotor activity in untreated animals and stimulates behavioral activity in states of hypoactivity. This state-dependent profile of behavioral effects is not shared with other dopamine D_{2} receptor antagonists. Ordopidine shows similar neurochemical effects as conventional dopamine D_{2} receptor antagonists, such as increased dopamine and/or dopamine metabolite levels in various brain areas like the frontal cortex, basal ganglia, and limbic system.

The actions and effects of ordopidine are similar to those of its close analogue pridopidine (which it differs from only by a single methyl group). Subsequent to their initial characterization, pridopidine was found to act as a sigma receptor ligand with much higher affinity than for the dopamine D_{2} receptor, with this balance of activities potentially explaining its atypicality and "dopaminergic stabilizer" properties.

Ordopidine was first described in the scientific literature by 2009. The drug was developed by Carlsson Research, NeuroSearch Sweden, and Saniona. As of June 2019, no recent development has been reported. Ordopidine has reached phase 1 clinical trials.

== See also ==
- List of investigational Parkinson's disease drugs
- OSU-6162 and 3-PPP
- Pridopidine and seridopidine
