= Pridopidine =

Chemical compound

Clinical data
- Drug class: Sigma σ_{1} receptor agonist
- ATC code: N07XX26 (WHO)

Identifiers
- IUPAC name: 4-(3-methylsulfonylphenyl)-1-propylpiperidine
- CAS Number: 346688-38-8
- PubChem CID: 9795739
- DrugBank: DB05371
- ChemSpider: 7971505
- UNII: HD4TW8S2VK
- KEGG: D09953
- ChEMBL: ChEMBL596802
- CompTox Dashboard (EPA): DTXSID90188225
- ECHA InfoCard: 100.240.998

Chemical and physical data
- Formula: C_{15}H_{23}NO_{2}S
- Molar mass: 281.41 g·mol^{−1}
- 3D model (JSmol): Interactive image
- SMILES: CCCN1CCC(CC1)C2=CC(=CC=C2)S(=O)(=O)C
- InChI: InChI=1S/C15H23NO2S/c1-3-9-16-10-7-13(8-11-16)14-5-4-6-15(12-14)19(2,17)18/h4-6,12-13H,3,7-11H2,1-2H3; Key:YGKUEOZJFIXDGI-UHFFFAOYSA-N

Pridopidine (developmental code name PL-101) is an orally administrated small molecule investigational drug. Pridopidine is a selective and potent sigma-1 receptor agonist. It is being developed by Prilenia Therapeutics and is currently in late-stage clinical development for Huntington's disease (HD) and amyotrophic lateral sclerosis (ALS).

== Mechanism of action ==
Pridopidine works by binding and activating an intracellular protein called the sigma-1 receptor (S1R) located at the mitochondria-associated membrane (MAM) of the endoplasmic reticulum. The S1R regulates key cellular processes crucial to neuronal health and survival. Selective activation of the S1R is a promising therapeutic target for treating neurodegenerative and neurodevelopmental disorders.

Pridopidine activation of the S1R demonstrates neuroprotective effects in numerous models of neurodegenerative diseases including HD, ALS, Glaucoma, Parkinson's disease (PD) and Alzheimer's disease (AD).

Pridopidine exhibits a neuroprotective effect against mutant Huntingtin (mHTT)-induced cell death in mouse primary HD neurons and human HD-induced pluripotent stem cells. It restores the impaired synaptic plasticity in HD neurons, enhances mitochondrial function, upregulates BDNF transport and secretion, reduces endoplasmic reticulum stress and restores dendritic spine abnormalities in HD and AD models. In models of ALS, pridopidine protects neuron-muscle connectivity and restores muscle integrity and contractility. These beneficial effects are exclusively mediated by the S1R as either deletion of this gene, or selective inhibition of its function, completely abolish pridopidine's beneficial effects.

Initially, the primary target of pridopidine was postulated to be the dopamine D2/D3 receptors. However, in vitro binding assays show that pridopidine has high affinity for the S1R and low affinity for other targets including the dopamine D2/D3 receptors, adrenergic a2c receptor and the Sigma-2 receptor. Furthermore, selective and robust occupancy of the S1R, with no or negligible occupancy of the D2/D3 receptors was demonstrated by in vivo positron emission tomography (PET) imaging studies in rats and human.

== Chemistry ==
=== Analogues ===
Analogues of pridopidine include ordopidine, OSU-6162, and 3-PPP, among others.

== Potential indications ==
=== Huntington's disease ===
Huntington's disease (HD) is a progressive fatal neurodegenerative disease caused by a mutation in the Huntingtin gene (expanded CAG repeat > 35). The disease is characterized by progressive motor abnormalities, cognitive decline, and psychiatric and behavioral symptoms. Adult-onset HD usually begins between 35 and 45 years of age. Following onset, motor, cognitive and functional outcomes steadily decline over 15 to 20 years, ultimately leading to a state of profound incapacity and death. The disease is inherited in an autosomal dominant manner, and thus each child of a parent with HD has a 50% chance of inheriting the mutated HD gene. For patients and their families, maintaining functional capacity is vital as it translates to a patient's ability to maintain their occupation, continue to manage their daily lives, and live independently.

A meta-analysis of four randomized controlled trials (RCTs) involving 1,130 patients (816 in the pridopidine group and 314 in the placebo group) found that pridopidine led to a slight, though not statistically significant, improvement in overall motor symptoms, as measured by the Unified Huntington's Disease Rating Scale Total Motor Score, compared to placebo. However, the drug significantly improved voluntary movements, as indicated by the Modified Motor Score. Pridopidine was generally well tolerated, with no significant differences in adverse events or serious adverse events compared to placebo. The findings suggest that pridopidine has potential for treating motor symptoms in HD, with a favorable safety profile, warranting further clinical trials to confirm its benefits.

=== Amyotrophic lateral sclerosis ===
Amyotrophic lateral sclerosis (ALS) is a devastating progressive fatal neurodegenerative disease characterized by upper and lower motor neuron degeneration. Over time this progressive loss of motor function leads to losing the ability to speak, eat, move and eventually breathe.

A phase 2 trial of the drug in ALS patients concluded in 2023 and did not reach its end points. However, one specific sub-group in the trial, patients with early and rapid onset of the disease's symptoms, did show significantly statistical improvement of their symptoms. As a result, a phase 3 trial was approved and began in early 2026. The phase 3 trial is expected to enroll 500 subjects.

== Society and culture ==
=== Legal status ===
In July 2025, the Committee for Medicinal Products for Human Use of the European Medicines Agency (EMA) recommended the refusal of a marketing authorization for Nurzigma, a medicine intended for the treatment of adults with Huntington's disease.

== See also ==
- List of investigational antipsychotics
- List of investigational Parkinson's disease drugs
- Ordopidine and seridopidine
