= Adrogolide =

Clinical data
- Other names: A-93431; ABT-431; ABT431; DAS-431; DAS431
- Routes of administration: Parenteral (e.g., intravenous, inhalation)
- Drug class: Dopamine D_{1}-like receptor agonist
- ATC code: None

Pharmacokinetic data
- Bioavailability: Oral: ≤4% Sublingual: 10–13% Inhalational: 82–107%
- Metabolism: Deacetylation
- Metabolites: A-86929
- Elimination half-life: 3–4 hours

Identifiers
- IUPAC name: [(1S,10R)-4-acetyloxy-15-propyl-14-thia-11-azatetracyclo[8.7.0.0^{2,7}.0^{13,17}]heptadeca-2,4,6,13(17),15-pentaen-5-yl] acetate
- CAS Number: 171752-56-0
- PubChem CID: 176876
- DrugBank: DB21406
- ChemSpider: 154049
- UNII: YC3281G42A
- ChEMBL: ChEMBL2104655
- CompTox Dashboard (EPA): DTXSID30169159

Chemical and physical data
- Formula: C_{22}H_{25}NO_{4}S
- Molar mass: 399.51 g·mol^{−1}
- 3D model (JSmol): Interactive image
- SMILES: CCCC1=CC2=C(S1)CN[C@H]3[C@H]2C4=CC(=C(C=C4CC3)OC(=O)C)OC(=O)C
- InChI: InChI=1S/C22H25NO4S/c1-4-5-15-9-17-21(28-15)11-23-18-7-6-14-8-19(26-12(2)24)20(27-13(3)25)10-16(14)22(17)18/h8-10,18,22-23H,4-7,11H2,1-3H3/t18-,22+/m1/s1; Key:KTEBZVJGMARTOQ-GCJKJVERSA-N

Adrogolide (INN; developmental code names A-93431, ABT-431, and DAS-431), also known as adrogolide hydrochloride (USAN) in the case of the hydrochloride salt, is a dopamine D_{1}-like receptor agonist which was under development for the treatment of Parkinson's disease, cognition disorders, and cocaine-related disorders but was never marketed.

It is a chemically stable and rapidly converted diacetate ester prodrug of the highly selective dopamine D_{1} and D_{5} receptor full agonist A-86929. The effects of adrogolide and A-86929 in animals and humans have been studied. Side effects of adrogolide in humans included injection site reactions, asthenia, headache, nausea, vomiting, postural hypotension, vasodilation, and dizziness.

Adrogolide was under development by Abbott Laboratories and DrugAbuse Sciences. It reached phase 2 clinical trials for Parkinson's disease prior to the discontinuation of its development in 2001. The drug is said to have been the first extensively characterized dopamine D_{1} receptor full agonist.

== See also ==
- List of investigational cognition and memory disorder drugs
- List of investigational Parkinson's disease drugs
- List of investigational substance-related disorder drugs
- Dihydrexidine (DAR-0100; IP-202)
