= Sonlicromanol =

Names
- IUPAC name (2S)-6-Hydroxy-2,5,7,8-tetramethyl-N-[(3R)-piperidin-3-yl]-3,4-dihydrochromene-2-carboxamide
- Other names: KH-176

Identifiers
CAS Number	1541170-75-5
3D model (JSmol)	Interactive image
ChEMBL	ChEMBL4802153
ChemSpider	58828127
DrugBank	DB16333
PubChem CID	72710875
UNII	JCU3O35RDS
- InChI: InChI=1S/C19H28N2O3/c1-11-12(2)17-15(13(3)16(11)22)7-8-19(4,24-17)18(23)21-14-6-5-9-20-10-14/h14,20,22H,5-10H2,1-4H3,(H,21,23)/t14-,19+/m1/s1 Key: LZYWLEPSQNXESC-KUHUBIRLSA-N
- SMILES: CC1=C(C2=C(CC[C@@](O2)(C)C(=O)N[C@@H]3CCCNC3)C(=C1O)C)C

Properties
Chemical formula	C_{19}H_{28}N_{2}O_{3}
Molar mass	332.444 g·mol^{−1}
Appearance	White solid
Density	1.2±0.1 g/cm^{3}
Melting point	226.2 °C (439.2 °F; 499.3 K)
Boiling point	570.8±50.0 °C at 760 mmHg (1059.4 °F; 844.0 K)
Solubility in water	0.224 mg/mL
log P	2.39
Acidity (pK_{a})	8.90, 11.20

Hazards
Flash point	299.0 °C (570.2 °F; 572.1 K)
- Except where otherwise noted, data are given for materials in their standard state (at 25 °C [77 °F], 100 kPa). Infobox references

Sonlicromanol (KH176) is a clinical-stage oral drug compound developed by Khondrion as a potential treatment for primary and secondary mitochondrial diseases, such as Leigh's Disease, MELAS and LHON. Due to dysfunctional mitochondria, an increased level of cellular reactive oxygen species (ROS) is observed in these patients, causing a wide range of symptoms. The active metabolite of Sonlicromanol (KH176m, or KH183) has several mechanisms of action, acting both as antioxidant and as reactive oxygen species (ROS)-redox modulator. Through selective suppression of microsomal prostaglandin E synthase-1 (mPGES-1), Sonlicromanol even has potency as anti-cancer drug for mPGES-1 overexpressing cancer like prostate cancer. Sonlicromanol has been evaluated in phase II clinical trials in the KHENERGYZE, KHENEREXT and KHENERGYC studies as potent candidate in treatment for mitochondrial diseases and results have been published. Specifically, sonlicromanol showed meaningful improvements on key symptoms associated with mitochondrial diseases. A phase 3 trial in patients with the m.3243A>G variant has started recruitment (KHENERFIN). Also, a Long COVID proof-of-concept trial has started recruitment.

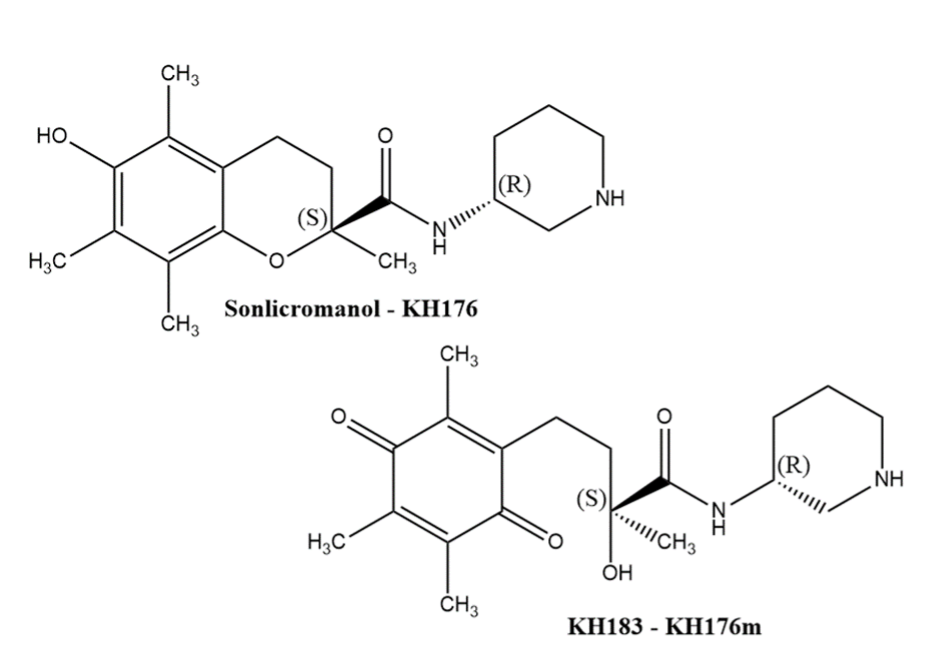
The chemical structures of Sonlicromanol - KH176 and its metabolite KH183 - KH176m

== Medical use ==
Sonlicromanol was principally developed as drug to release symptoms for patients with mitochondrial diseases like Leigh's disease, MELAS (Mitochondrial, Encephalomyopathy, Lactic acidosis, and Stroke-like episodes) spectrum disorders, and LHON (Leber's Hereditary Optic Neuropathy). Signs of these mitochondrial diseases include fatigue, loss of muscle strength and coordination, cognitive impairment, migraine, heart failure, diabetes, and stunted growth. These signs are the consequence of impairment in one of the five complexes forming the oxidative phosphorylation system, localized on the mitochondrial inner membrane. Disruption in the mitochondrial redox balance results in increased cellular oxidative stress due to increased levels of ROS. Especially superoxide and hydrogen peroxide levels are elevated with mitochondrial dysfunction, which triggers inflammation.

In addition to mitochondrial diseases, Sonlicromanol was also found to be potentially useful as an anti-cancer drug. Only mPGES-1 overexpressing cancer like prostate cancer can possibly be treated with Sonlicromanol. Future research will have to prove whether Sonlicromanol is indeed applicable in this field.

== History ==
In vitro and in vivo animal studies showed promising pharmacokinetic and safety profiles for Sonlicromanol., allowing for randomized, placebo-controlled, double blind phase 1 clinical trials, performed in healthy male volunteers. This first human in vivo study was performed starting in 2015 and the results were published in 2017. The results of the exploratory phase IIA trial, the KHENERGY study, were published in 2019. This study included a single-center, double-blinded, randomized, placebo-controlled 2-way crossover trial, during which patients received 100 mg Sonlicromanol and placebo in random order, both for 28 days. Currently, three phase II trials are in progress. In the KHENERGYZE study, patients receive 50 mg Sonlicromanol, 100 mg Sonlicromanol and a placebo, all for 28 days in random order. Both dose-finding and efficacy assessment are aims of this study, which is planned to be completed in May 2022. KHENEREXT is the follow-up study, which is an open-label, multi-center trial, during which patients receive either 50 or 100 mg of Sonlicromanol twice a day for an entire year to explore the long-term safety and efficacy. Lastly, the KHENERGYC study is in progress, which aims to reveal the safety, efficacy and pharmacokinetics in children

== Synthesis & Structure ==
The water-soluble form of vitamin E (Trolox) and Trolox-derived antioxidants were found to be promising mitochondrial disease drug candidates. To further investigate these properties, Khondrion synthesized 226 compounds through modification of the side chain on the carboxyl moiety while conserving the chromanyl group, thereby conserving the antioxidant capacity. The ability to scavenge cellular ROS and to protect patient-derived cells from redox perturbation were tested on mitochondrial patient cells. The calculated IC50 values from the ROS assay and the EC50 values from the Redox Stress Survival assay for all screened compounds showed that KH176 (Sonlicromanol) had the best overall performance in terms of properties such as potency, stability, water solubility, oral bioavailability, blood-brain barrier permeability and metabolism. For all research, the (S,R) stereoisomer of Sonlicromanol is used.

== Metabolism ==
The most important metabolite of Sonlicromanol is formed via biotransformation catalysed by cytochrome P450 3A4, which leads to the active metabolite KH176m (KH183). A total of 20 metabolites of Sonlicromanol were found in humans and animals, most of which result from oxidation, hydration and glucuronidation. The extent of metabolism in vitro was rather low: only 2-15% of the parent compound was metabolized after 120 minutes. In vivo, however, on average 83% was converted to KH176m after 4 weeks of dosing.

== Mechanism of action ==
Patients with mitochondrial diseases have increased ROS levels, leading to increased cellular stress. The in vivo metabolite of Sonlicromanol, KH176m, acts both as redox-modulator (via mPGES-1 inhibition) and as antioxidant (via Thioredoxin/Peroxiredoxin system). The redox-modulator pathway of KH176m is suggested to happen as follows. As a result of the increased ROS levels, the level of prostaglandin E2 (PGE2) is increased, triggering inflammation. KH176m is suggested to selectively inhibit mPGES-1 activity. Thereby, the overproduction of PGE2 is blocked. If the level of PGE2 decreases, proinflammatory responses are reduced, thereby reducing symptoms of mitochondrial diseases. Apart from directly inhibiting mPGES-1 activity, KH176m also indirectly reduces mPGES-1 transcriptional expression. This is because PGE2 induces a positive feedback loop that increases mPGES1 transcription, which is reduced if the PGE2 levels are reduced.

The second pathway in which KH176m reduces inflammation is as an antioxidant, targeting ROS that are important in pathogenesis of disorders regarding mitochondrial oxidative phosphorylation. Especially ROS formation by the oxidative phosphorylation complex I is reduced by targeting the antioxidant enzymes in the Thioredoxin/Peroxiredoxin system. It was found that KH176m enhances peroxiredoxin antioxidant activity, which in turn reduces hydrogen peroxide to water. Further research is required to find out whether KH176m acts as cofactor on peroxidase activity or alters peroxiredoxin-dependent redox signaling.

== Efficacy ==
The safety and efficacy of Sonlicromanol were assessed in a phase I randomized control trial (RCT) in healthy volunteers and a phase IIA RCT in patients with mitochondrial m.3243A > G spectrum disorder. The studies revealed that Sonlicromanol had an acceptable safety profile and pharmacokinetics. It was also shown that Sonlicromanol was well tolerated over a treatment period of 28 days, and had a positive effect on cognition, an important liability for patients who have mitochondrial disease. Sonlicromanol was also shown to improve motor performance in mice with a mutation mimicking Leigh disease. Furthermore, reduction was observed in the mitochondrial disease-related depressive symptoms, and a positive effect was reported on alertness and mood. The mechanism for the improvement in depressive symptoms and alertness is currently unknown and could be a consequence of other treatment effects of Sonlicromanol, such as the reduction of migraine headache, the reduction of muscle complaints, or the increase in energy. These effects are of particular importance for the treatment of patients with mitochondrial diseases, but Sonlicromanol could also be of help to people with inflammatory pain, inflammatory neurological diseases, inflammatory malignancies, and even cancer. Phase II clinical trials for Sonlicromanol further confirmed that subjects with m.3243A>G related and other mitochondrial diseases experience improvements regarding mood and alertness.

== Adverse effects ==
Sonlicromanol was well tolerated in doses as high as 800 mg single dose and 400 mg twice daily. Both the Sonlicromanol- and placebo-treated groups reported headache as the most frequent adverse effect. Only if the plasma concentration gets higher than 500 ng/mL, an increased heart rate and blood pressure are observed. Although there was no evident dose-response association for any of the adverse effects after single and multiple dosage administration, a single dose of 2000 mg resulted in unexpectedly more severe adverse events. Nausea, vomiting, dizziness, and psychological abnormalities were described at this level, which is a factor 10 above the anticipated daily human efficacious dose of 200 mg/day, along with a prolonged corrected QT time. Sonlicromanol was found to have a dose-dependent effect on cardiac repolarization. After single-dose administration of 800 mg and 2000 mg of Sonlicromanol, as well as multiple doses of 400 mg twice daily, QTcF (Fridericia's corrected QT interval) prolongation was observed. Post-hoc studies showed that this QTcF prolongation was associated with changes in morphology and other cardiac intervals. No cardiac electrophysiological abnormalities were seen with single-dose administration of 200 mg or lower, or multiple oral dosages of 100 and 200 mg two times daily, according to a detailed study of the electrocardiograms. A dose of 100 mg twice a day was found to have a good balance between desired effect and adverse effect.

Sonlicromanol has been shown to interact with P-glycoprotein (PgP), which can transport the drug out of cells. This, together with suspected inhibition of CYP3A4, can increase plasma concentrations of KH176(m). An increase in adverse effects, especially on cardiac repolarization, might be the consequence.

== Toxicity ==
In 2017 a phase I study on Sonlicromanol was done on healthy male volunteers. The study concluded that a KH176 is well tolerated up to single doses of 800 mg and multiple doses of 400 mg twice daily and has a pharmacokinetic profile supportive for a twice daily dosing. At high doses however, KH176 showed clinically relevant changes in the cardiac electrophysiology. Changes included prolonged QTc interval and changes in T wave morphology. At lower doses no changes in the cardiac electrophysiology were found when compared to the placebo. In healthy volunteers no effects on redox biomarkers were observed. Furthermore, non-clinical and safety pharmacology studies revealed no mutagenic or carcinogenic effects and no phototoxic effects.

== Effect on animals ==
The plasma pharmacokinetics and tissue distribution of KH176(m) after a single intravenous (2 mg/kg) or oral (10 mg/kg) dosage administration were investigated in male mice and rats. The results show that KH176 has a high oral bioavailability of 68% and 74%, respectively. KH176(m) was also found in organs such as the brain, heart, muscle, and liver. In mice and rats, both compounds displayed high plasma clearance and short half-lives due to their fast metabolic rates.

In a 28-day repeat oral dose toxicity study in dogs and rats, the single- and multiple-dose toxicokinetics of KH176(m) were studied. From Day 1 to Day 28, both species showed a dose-proportional increase in KH176(m) exposure. At any dose level, no significant accumulation of KH176(m) systemic exposure was observed following repeated dosing. On Day 1 and Day 28, the KH176m to KH176 ratios in systemic exposure varied from 0.67 to 0.97 in dogs and from 0.055 to 0.091 in rats. No gender difference was found in KH176(m) systemic exposure.
