= Seridopidine =

Clinical data
- Other names: ACR343; ACR-343
- Routes of administration: Oral
- Drug class: Dopamine D_{2} receptor modulator
- ATC code: None

Identifiers
- IUPAC name: 1-ethyl-4-(3-fluoro-5-methylsulfonylphenyl)piperidine
- CAS Number: 883631-51-4
- PubChem CID: 11572784
- DrugBank: DB19579
- ChemSpider: 9747554
- UNII: 1359K87ZYE
- ChEMBL: ChEMBL3545388
- CompTox Dashboard (EPA): DTXSID90237000

Chemical and physical data
- Formula: C_{14}H_{20}FNO_{2}S
- Molar mass: 285.38 g·mol^{−1}
- 3D model (JSmol): Interactive image
- SMILES: CCN1CCC(CC1)C2=CC(=CC(=C2)S(=O)(=O)C)F
- InChI: InChI=1S/C14H20FNO2S/c1-3-16-6-4-11(5-7-16)12-8-13(15)10-14(9-12)19(2,17)18/h8-11H,3-7H2,1-2H3; Key:PHRDGRSMZPOCAB-UHFFFAOYSA-N

Seridopidine (INN; developmental code name ACR343) is a dopamine D_{2} receptor modulator and so-called "dopaminergic stabilizer" which is or was under development for the treatment of Parkinson's disease and Tourette's syndrome. It is taken orally. The drug is or was under development by Carlsson Research AB, NeuroSearch, and Saniona. As of June 2019, no recent development has been reported for Parkinson's disease or Tourette's syndrome. The drug has reached phase 1 clinical trials for both indications. It entered phase 1 trials by 2008. Seridopidine is one of the "dopidine" drugs, with the others including pridopidine (ACR-16) and ordopidine (ACR-325).

== See also ==
- List of investigational Parkinson's disease drugs
- List of investigational Tourette's syndrome drugs
- Pridopidine and ordopidine
