= Vutiglabridin =

Chemical compound

Legal status
- Legal status: Investigational

Identifiers
- IUPAC name: 2-(8,8-Dimethyl-3,4,9,10-tetrahydro-2H-pyrano[2,3-h]chromen-3-yl)-5-ethoxyphenol
- CAS Number: 1800188-47-9
- PubChem CID: 118204185
- UNII: 7AWD9J49UP

Chemical and physical data
- Formula: C_{22}H_{26}O_{4}
- Molar mass: 354.446 g·mol^{−1}
- 3D model (JSmol): Interactive image
- SMILES: CCOC1=CC(=C(C=C1)C2CC3=C(C4=C(C=C3)OC(CC4)(C)C)OC2)O
- InChI: InChI=1S/C22H26O4/c1-4-24-16-6-7-17(19(23)12-16)15-11-14-5-8-20-18(21(14)25-13-15)9-10-22(2,3)26-20/h5-8,12,15,23H,4,9-11,13H2,1-3H3; Key:IUXJXQLTUMGHHL-UHFFFAOYSA-N

Vutiglabridin (HSG4112) is an experimental anti-obesity drug that is a synthetic structural analog of glabridin.
