= OSU-6162 =

Chemical compound

Clinical data
- Other names: OSU6162; PNU-96391; PNU96391
- ATC code: None

Identifiers
- IUPAC name: (3S)-3-[3-(methylsulfonyl)phenyl]-1-propylpiperidine
- CAS Number: 146798-66-5
- PubChem CID: 9795741
- ChemSpider: 7971507
- UNII: V5SBJBUJW6
- ChEMBL: ChEMBL311730
- CompTox Dashboard (EPA): DTXSID40431531
- ECHA InfoCard: 100.216.320

Chemical and physical data
- Formula: C_{15}H_{23}NO_{2}S
- Molar mass: 281.41 g·mol^{−1}
- 3D model (JSmol): Interactive image
- SMILES: CCCN1CCC[C@H](C1)C2=CC(=CC=C2)S(=O)(=O)C
- InChI: InChI=1S/C15H23NO2S/c1-3-9-16-10-5-7-14(12-16)13-6-4-8-15(11-13)19(2,17)18/h4,6,8,11,14H,3,5,7,9-10,12H2,1-2H3/t14-/m1/s1; Key:GZVBVBMMNFIXGE-CQSZACIVSA-N

OSU-6162, also known as PNU-96391, is a compound which acts as a partial agonist at both dopamine D_{2} receptors and 5-HT_{2A} receptors. It acts as a dopamine stabilizer in a similar manner to the closely related drug pridopidine, and has antipsychotic, anti-addictive and anti-Parkinsonian effects in animal studies. Both enantiomers show similar activity but with different ratios of effects, with the (S) enantiomer (–)-OSU-6162 that is more commonly used in research, having higher binding affinity to D_{2} but is a weaker partial agonist at 5-HT_{2A}, while the (R) enantiomer (+)-OSU-6162 has higher efficacy at 5-HT_{2A} but lower D_{2} affinity.

== See also ==
- List of investigational hallucinogens and entactogens
- List of investigational Parkinson's disease drugs
- Non-hallucinogenic 5-HT_{2A} receptor agonist
- 3-Phenylpiperidine
- Flumexadol
- LPH-5
- PF-219,061
