= Phenserine =

Chemical compound

Clinical data
- Other names: (-)-Phenserine, (-)-Eseroline phenylcarbamate, N-phenylcarbamoyleseroline, N-phenylcarbamoyl eseroline
- Routes of administration: By mouth

Legal status
- Legal status: Investigational

Pharmacokinetic data
- Bioavailability: ~100%
- Metabolism: liver
- Metabolites: (−)-N1-norphenserine, (−)-N8-norphenserine, (−)-N1,N8-bisnorphenserine
- Elimination half-life: 12.6 minutes
- Duration of action: 8.25 hours
- Excretion: renal or hepatic clearance

Identifiers
- IUPAC name: (3a'S,8aR)-1,3a,8-Trimethyl-1H,2H,3H,3aH,8H,8aH-pyrrolo[2,3-b]indol-5-yl N-phenylcarbamate
- CAS Number: 101246-66-6
- PubChem CID: 192706
- DrugBank: DB04892
- ChemSpider: 167225
- UNII: SUE285UG3S
- ChEMBL: ChEMBL74926
- CompTox Dashboard (EPA): DTXSID00906018
- ECHA InfoCard: 100.162.417

Chemical and physical data
- Formula: C_{20}H_{23}N_{3}O_{2}
- Molar mass: 337.423 g·mol^{−1}
- 3D model (JSmol): Interactive image
- Melting point: 150 °C (302 °F)
- SMILES: [H][C@]12N(C)CC[C@@]1(C)C1=C(C=CC(OC(=O)NC3=CC=CC=C3)=C1)N2C
- InChI: InChI=1S/C20H23N3O2/c1-20-11-12-22(2)18(20)23(3)17-10-9-15(13-16(17)20)25-19(24)21-14-7-5-4-6-8-14/h4-10,13,18H,11-12H2,1-3H3,(H,21,24)/t18-,20+/m1/s1; Key:PBHFNBQPZCRWQP-QUCCMNQESA-N

Phenserine (also known as (-)-phenserine or (-)-eseroline phenylcarbamate) is a synthetic drug that has been investigated as a potential treatment for Alzheimer's disease (AD). The compound exhibits both neuroprotective and neurotrophic effects. The development of phenserine, initially patented by the National Institute on Aging (NIA), was suspended following phase III clinical trials conducted in 2006, shortly after licensing agreements were issued. Because the clinical trials were not completed, the FDA did not approve the drug. A retrospective meta-analysis of phenserine research suggested that its clinical invalidation arose from unresolved methodological issues that were not adequately addressed prior to progression into later-phase trials.

Phenserine was initially developed as an acetylcholinesterase (AChE) inhibitor and demonstrated significant amelioration of several neuropathological features, alongside improvements in cognitive functions. Its therapeutic effects involve both cholinergic and non-cholinergic mechanisms.

Clinically translatable doses of phenserine have demonstrated relatively high tolerability and rarely produce severe adverse effects. At supratherapeutic doses (approximately 20 mg/kg), a limited number of cholinergic adverse effects—such as nausea and tremor—have been reported; these effects are not considered life-threatening.

One formulation of phenserine, (-)-phenserine tartrate, exhibits high bioavailability and solubility and is administered orally. Phenserine and its metabolites readily penetrate the brain due to high blood–brain barrier permeability and exhibit sustained pharmacological activity despite a relatively short plasma half-life. Posiphen ((+)-phenserine), the enantiomer of (-)-phenserine, has also been investigated as a potential therapeutic agent, either alone or in combination with (-)-phenserine, for slowing the progression of neurological diseases, particularly Alzheimer's disease.

== History ==
Phenserine was first investigated as a substitute for physostigmine which failed to satisfy the clinical standards for treating Alzheimer's disease, and developed into more compatible remedy. It was initially invented by Nigel Greig whose laboratory is affiliated with the National Institute on Aging (NIA) under the US National Institutes of Health (NIH) which subsequently released a patent of phenserine as an AChE inhibitor in 1995. During phase I in 2000, the supplementary patent regarding its inhibitory mechanism upon β-amyloid precursor protein (APP) synthesis was added. Following 6 years of phase I and II trials, Axonyx Corporation had licensed phenserine to Daewoong Pharmaceutical and QR Pharma (later adopted new corporation name, Annovis Bio) companies in 2006, which then planned to undertake phase III trial and merchandize the drug. However, the clinical deficits ̶ representatively from a double-blinded, placebo-controlled and 7-month phase III trial which had been conducted on 377 mild to moderate Alzheimer's disease patients across Austria, Croatia, Spain, and UK ̶ were discovered and no significance was exhibited for the drug efficacy. This led to the relinquishment of phenserine development, merely displaying its marketable potential.

=== Approval status ===
Phenserine failed in phase III of Alzheimer's disease-aimed clinical trials and there has yet been no promise of the trial resumption since 2006. The methodological problems of trials are frequently speculated as the principal reason for the failure of FDA approval as well as the scarcity of Alzheimer's disease drugs. The underlying complications are generated by an inordinate variance in clinical outcomes and poor determination in optimal dosing.

Intra and inter-site variations were incurred by a lack of baseline evaluation and longitudinal assessment on placebo groups. This produced an inadequate power and, thus, appeared to have insufficient statistical significance. In light of the dose determination, the criteria for human subject engagement was not meticulously established before dosing and the effective dose range was not completely established in phase I and II, yet still persisting to phase III. Compared to other Alzheimer's disease drugs, such as donepenzil, tacrine and metrifonate, the clinical advancement of phenserine involves comparably high compliance in outcome measures and protocol regimentation on methods and the clinical phase transition.

== Dosage ==
Clinically, the translatable dose of phenserine was primarily employed within a range of 1 to 5 mg/kg where the unit calibration took account of the body surface area. This standard dose range was generally well tolerated in long term trials by neuronal cell cultures, animal models and humans. Increment in dosing by 10 mg/kg is still tolerated without instigating any physiological implication. The maximal administration of phenserine up to 15 mg/kg was reported in rats.

=== Overdose ===
The dose of 20 mg/kg and above are appraised as overdosing in which cholinergic adverse effects ensue.

The symptoms of overdosing includes:

- Nausea
- Vomiting
- Dizziness
- Tremors
- Bradycardia

Mild symptoms were notified in clinical trials but no other seriously considerable adverse effects were expressed. Tremor was also noted as one of the dose-limiting actions.

== Interactions ==
Currently, 282 drugs have been reported to make interactions with phenserine.

== Pharmacology ==
=== Pharmacokinetics ===
Oral bioavailability of phenserine was shown to be very high, up to 100%. Its bioavailability was tested by computing the drug's delivery rate across the rat's blood brain barrier. The drug concentration, reached in the brain, is 10-fold higher than plasma levels, verifying phenserine as a brain-permeable AChE inhibitor.

Relative to its short plasma half-life of 8 to 12 minutes, phenserine exhibits a long duration of action with the half-life of 8.25 hours in which the hindering effect on AChE is time-dependently faded. With the administration of phenserine, 70% or higher AChE inhibitory action in the blood was observed in preclinical studies and with systemic phenserine administration, the extracellular ACh level in the striatum increased up to three times. Through PET studies and microdialysis, the compound's brain permeability was able to be further elucidated.

=== Pharmacodynamics ===
Phenserine was developed primarily as a treatment for Alzheimer's disease, with additional therapeutic potential for other neurological disorders, including Parkinson's disease, dementia, and amyotrophic lateral sclerosis. Administration of phenserine shortly after disease onset has been shown to reduce the severity of neurodegeneration and associated cognitive impairments. Post-injury intervention at clinically translatable doses has similarly demonstrated significant attenuation of neurodegenerative pathology, thereby preventing chronic deterioration of cognitive function. The neuropathological cascades targeted by phenserine may arise spontaneously or be triggered by mild to moderate traumatic brain injuries (TBI), including concussion, diffuse axonal injury, ischemic, and hypoxic brain injuries. Such traumatic brain injuries have been extensively investigated and experimentally induced as disease models in phenserine research. TBIs are strongly correlated with the onset of neurodegenerative disorders and are known to precipitate long-term cognitive and behavioral impairments.

Phenserine has been shown to mitigate multiple neuropathological cascades triggered by traumatic brain injury through both cholinergic and non-cholinergic mechanisms.

==== Cholinergic ====
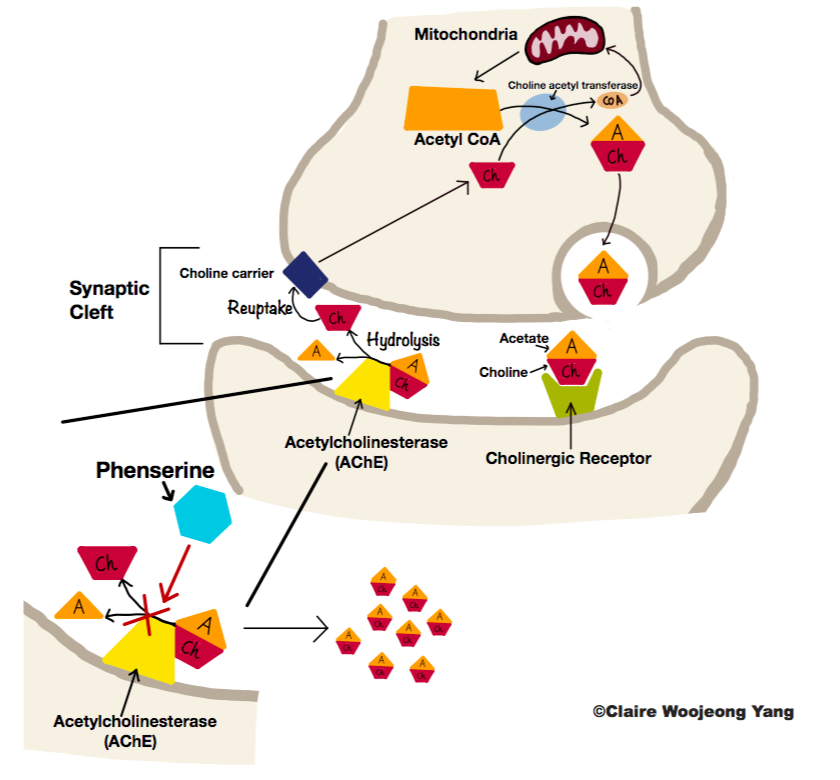
AChE mechanism of action in the synaptic cleft and how phenserine inhibits the AChE

Phenserine serves as an acetylcholinesterase (AChE) inhibitor which selectively acts on the acetylcholinesterase enzyme. It prevents acetylcholine from being hydrolyzed by the enzyme and enables the neurotransmitter to be further retained at the synaptic clefts. Such mechanism promotes the cholinergic neuronal circuits to be activated and thereby enhances memory and cognition in Alzheimer's subjects.

==== Non-cholinergic ====
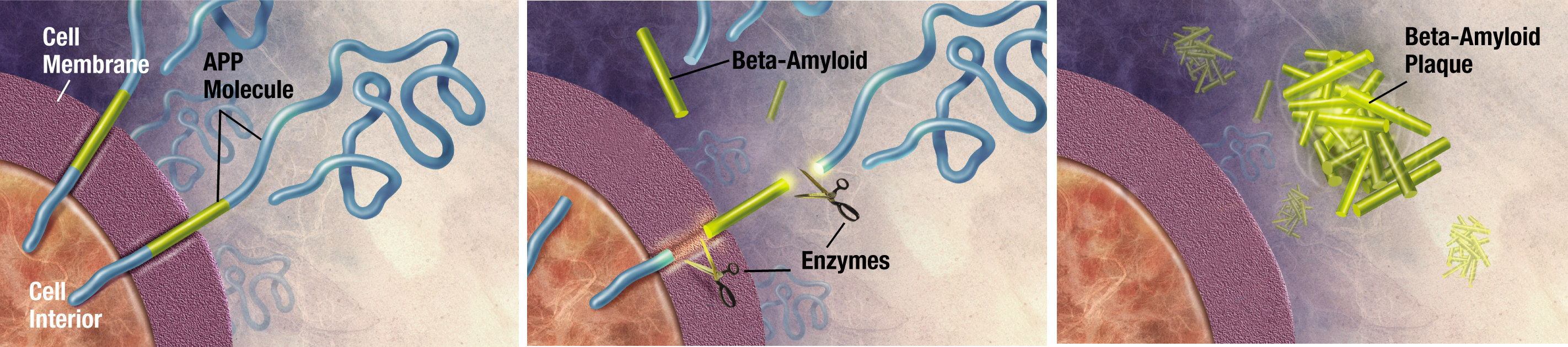
β-Amyloid (Aβ) plaque formation from β-amyloid precursor protein (APP)

In clinical trials, phenserine was demonstrated to alleviate neurodegeneration, repressing the programmed neuronal cell death and enhancing the stem cell survival and differentiation. The alleviation can be achieved by increase in levels of neurotrophic BDNF and anti-apoptotic protein, Bcl-2, which subsequently reduces expressions of pro-apoptotic factors, GFAP and activates caspase 3. The treatment also suppresses the levels of Alzheimer's disease-inducing proteins which are β-amyloid precursor protein (APP) and Aβ peptide. The drug interaction with the APP gene mediates the expression of both APP and its following product, Aβ protein. This regulating action reverses the glial cell-favored differentiation and increases the neuronal cell output.

Phenserine also attenuates the neuroinflammation which involves the excessive activation of microglial cells to remove the cellular wastes from injury lesions. The accumulation of the activated glia near the site of brain injury is unnecessarily prolonged, stimulating the oxidative stress. The inflammatory response was significantly weakened with the introduction of phenserine, which was evidenced with discouraged expression of pro-inflammatory markers, IBA 1 and TNF-α. The disrupted integrity of the blood brain barrier by a degrading chemical, MMP-9, leading to neuroinflammation, is restored by phenserine as well.

The alpha-synucleins, the toxic aggregates resulting from the protein misfolding, are highly observed in Parkinson's disease. The drug therapy was proven to neutralize the toxicity of alpha-synucleins via protein translation, alleviating the symptoms of the disease.

== Chemistry ==
=== Enantiomer (posiphen) ===
Comparison of the chemical structures of phenserine (left) and posiphen (right)

(-)-Phenserine, generally referred to phenserine, acts as an active enantiomer for the inhibition of acetylcholinesterase (AChE) while posiphen, its alternative enantiomer, was comparably demonstrated as a poor AChE inhibitor.

In the history of posiphen research, several companies were interactively involved. In 2005, an Investigational New Drug (IND) application of posiphen was filed with FDA by TorreyPines Therapeutics while its phase I trial on animal models had been implemented by Axonyx. Axonyx and TorreyPines Therapeutics officially signed for their merger agreement in 2006 and licensed the drug to QR Pharma in 2008. The clinical trials of posiphen against Alzheimer's disease are still underway.

== Research ==
A 5-year double blinded, donepezil-controlled clinical study for validation of Alzheimer's disease course modification using phenserine has been undertaken as from 2018, involving 200 patients in the UK and US. The study aims to reduce variation in AD therapeutic response between patients via optimal dose formulation.

== See also ==
- List of investigational cognition and memory disorder drugs
