= BP-897 =

Chemical compound

Clinical data
- ATC code: none

Identifiers
- IUPAC name: N-[4-[4-(2-methoxyphenyl)piperazin-1-yl]butyl]naphthalene-2-carboxamide
- CAS Number: 314776-92-6
- PubChem CID: 3038495
- IUPHAR/BPS: 7625
- ChemSpider: 2302059
- UNII: 20PLE5W821
- ChEMBL: ChEMBL25236
- CompTox Dashboard (EPA): DTXSID60953482
- ECHA InfoCard: 100.150.041

Chemical and physical data
- Formula: C_{26}H_{31}N_{3}O_{2}
- Molar mass: 417.553 g·mol^{−1}
- 3D model (JSmol): Interactive image
- SMILES: COc1ccccc1N3CCN(CC3)CCCCNC(=O)c4ccc2ccccc2c4
- InChI: InChI=1S/C26H31N3O2/c1-31-25-11-5-4-10-24(25)29-18-16-28(17-19-29)15-7-6-14-27-26(30)23-13-12-21-8-2-3-9-22(21)20-23/h2-5,8-13,20H,6-7,14-19H2,1H3,(H,27,30); Key:MNHDKMDLOJSCGN-UHFFFAOYSA-N

BP-897 is a drug used in scientific research which acts as a potent selective dopamine D_{3} receptor partial agonist with an in vitro intrinsic activity of ~0.6 and ~70x greater affinity for D_{3} over D_{2} receptors and is suspected to have partial agonist or antagonist activity in vivo. It has mainly been used in the study of treatments for cocaine addiction. A study comparing BP-897 with the potent, antagonistic, and highly D_{3} selective SB-277,011-A found, "SB 277011-A (1–10 mg/kg) was able to block cue-induced reinstatement of nicotine-seeking, indicating that DRD3 selective antagonism may be an effective approach to prevent relapse for nicotine. In contrast, BP 897 did not block the cue-induced reinstatement of nicotine-seeking or nicotine-taking under the FR5 schedule."

== See also ==
- List of investigational Parkinson's disease drugs
