= PNU-99,194 =

Chemical compound

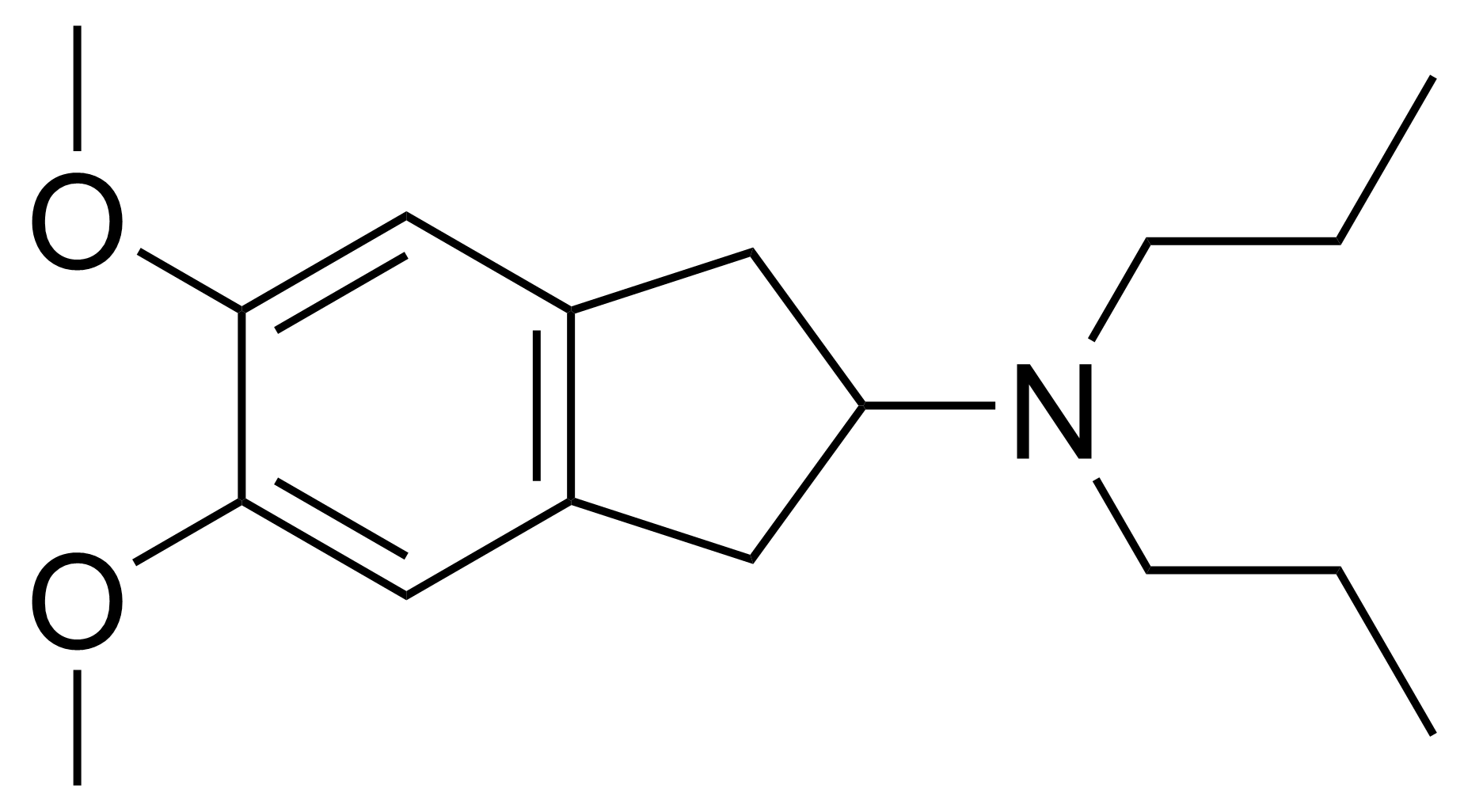

Clinical data
- Routes of administration: Oral
- ATC code: none

Legal status
- Legal status: In general: uncontrolled

Identifiers
- IUPAC name: 5,6-dimethoxy-N,N-dipropyl-2,3-dihydro-1H-inden-2-amine
- CAS Number: 82668-33-5 83598-46-3 (maleate) 153570-58-2 (hydrochloride)
- PubChem CID: 5626
- ChemSpider: 5424
- UNII: 929J96FO8T
- ChEMBL: ChEMBL16410
- CompTox Dashboard (EPA): DTXSID50274471

Chemical and physical data
- Formula: C_{17}H_{27}NO_{2}
- Molar mass: 277.408 g·mol^{−1}
- 3D model (JSmol): Interactive image
- SMILES: O(c1cc2c(cc1OC)CC(N(CCC)CCC)C2)C

PNU-99,194(A) (or U-99,194(A)) is a drug of the 2-aminoindane family which acts as a moderately selective D_{3} receptor antagonist with ~15-30-fold preference for D_{3} over the D_{2} subtype. Though it has substantially greater preference for D_{3} over D_{2}, the latter receptor does still play some role in its effects, as evidenced by the fact that PNU-99,194 weakly stimulates both prolactin secretion and striatal dopamine synthesis, actions it does not share with the more selective (100-fold) D_{3} receptor antagonists S-14,297 and GR-103,691.

In rodent studies, low doses of PNU-99,194 produce conditioned place preference (CPP) with no effect on intracranial self-stimulation (ICSS), whereas low doses of D_{3} agonists like 7-OH-DPAT inhibit ICSS behavior and cause conditioned place aversion (CPA). In contrast, high doses of PNU-99,194 produce CPA and inhibit ICSS, while high doses of 7-OH-DPAT result in the opposite. Paralleling this, low doses of PNU-99,194 and 7-OH-DPAT induce hyperactivity and hypoactivity, respectively, whereas the inverse is seen at high doses with both agents. These data indicate that the D_{3} receptor has biphasic effects on reward mechanisms and locomotor activity, likely due to opposing roles of autoreceptors versus postsynaptic receptors.

Other effects of PNU-99,194 at low doses in rodents include increased nociceptive responses, hypothermia, anxiolysis, and facilitation of learning and memory, as well as augmentation and inhibition, respectively, of amphetamine-induced reward and behavioral sensitization, and reversal of morphine-induced CPP. At high doses it inhibits the self-administration of cocaine in both rats and monkeys.

== See also ==
- Substituted 2-aminoindane
- Nafadotride
- GSK-598809
- SB-277,011-A
- 7-OH-DPAT
- UH-232
- RDS-127
