= ST-148 =

ST-148 may refer to:

- ST-148 (antiviral)
- ST-148 (D2L antagonist)
