= C22H27N3O2 =

The molecular formula C_{22}H_{27}N_{3}O_{2} (molar mass: 365.46 g/mol) may refer to:

- ALD-52, a chemical analogue of LSD
- Caroverine, a psychoactive drug
- Nafadotride, a dopamine antagonist
