= L-741,626 =

Chemical compound

Clinical data
- ATC code: none

Identifiers
- IUPAC name: 3-[4-(4-Chlorophenyl)-4-hydroxypiperidin-l-yl]methyl-1H-indole
- CAS Number: 81226-60-0
- PubChem CID: 133633
- IUPHAR/BPS: 177
- ChemSpider: 117877
- UNII: WTW4A6SW92
- CompTox Dashboard (EPA): DTXSID30230974

Chemical and physical data
- Formula: C_{20}H_{21}ClN_{2}O
- Molar mass: 340.85 g·mol^{−1}
- 3D model (JSmol): Interactive image
- SMILES: OC(CC1)(C2=CC=C(Cl)C=C2)CCN1CC3=CNC4=CC=CC=C43
- InChI: InChI=1S/C20H21ClN2O/c21-17-7-5-16(6-8-17)20(24)9-11-23(12-10-20)14-15-13-22-19-4-2-1-3-18(15)19/h1-8,13,22,24H,9-12,14H2; Key:LLBLNMUONVVVPG-UHFFFAOYSA-N

L-741,626 is a drug which acts as a potent and selective antagonist for the dopamine receptor D_{2}. It has good selectivity over the related D_{3} and D_{4} subtypes and other receptors. L-741,626 is used for laboratory research into brain function and has proved particularly useful for distinguishing D_{2} mediated responses from those produced by the closely related D_{3} subtype, and for studying the roles of these subtypes in the action of cocaine and amphetamines in the brain.
