= BP1.4979 =

Clinical data
- Other names: BP-1.4979; BP14979; BP-14979
- Routes of administration: Oral
- Drug class: Dopamine D_{3} receptor agonist

Pharmacokinetic data
- Onset of action: 1 hour (T_{max})
- Elimination half-life: 8 hours

Identifiers
- IUPAC name: N-[4-[2-[4-(3-cyanophenyl)piperazin-1-yl]ethyl]cyclohexyl]-3-methoxypropanamide
- CAS Number: 1000036-77-0
- PubChem CID: 57964460
- DrugBank: DB16302
- ChemSpider: 129321455
- UNII: XN7HA74WB0
- ChEMBL: ChEMBL4297484

Chemical and physical data
- Formula: C_{23}H_{34}N_{4}O_{2}
- Molar mass: 398.551 g·mol^{−1}
- 3D model (JSmol): Interactive image
- SMILES: COCCC(=O)NC1CCC(CC1)CCN2CCN(CC2)C3=CC=CC(=C3)C#N
- InChI: InChI=1S/C23H34N4O2/c1-29-16-10-23(28)25-21-7-5-19(6-8-21)9-11-26-12-14-27(15-13-26)22-4-2-3-20(17-22)18-24/h2-4,17,19,21H,5-16H2,1H3,(H,25,28); Key:PLMAPPWZOQMTBI-UHFFFAOYSA-N

BP1.4979 is a selective dopamine D_{3} receptor agonist which is under development for the treatment of binge-eating disorder, obsessive–compulsive disorder (OCD), restless legs syndrome (RLS), and smoking withdrawal. It is taken orally. The drug acts as a highly potent weak partial agonist of the dopamine D_{3} receptor (K_{i} = ~1 nM; EC_{50} = 0.7 nM; E_{max} = 32%). It has around 200-fold higher affinity for the dopamine D_{3} receptor than for the dopamine D_{2} receptor (K_{i} = 192 nM), where it is an antagonist. BP1.4979 showed 66% dopamine D_{3} receptor occupancy and 8% dopamine D_{2} receptor occupancy with positron emission tomography (PET) imaging in a clinical study. The time to peak levels of BP1.4979 is 1 hour and its elimination half-life is about 8 hours. The drug is under development by Bioprojet. As of January 2026, it is in phase 2 clinical trials for all indications.

== See also ==
- List of investigational eating disorder drugs
- List of investigational obsessive–compulsive disorder drugs
- List of investigational restless legs syndrome drugs
- List of investigational substance-related disorder drugs
