= ABT-925 =

Clinical data
- Other names: ABT925; A-437203; A437203; BSF-201640; BSF201640; DTA-201; DTA201; LU-201640; LU201640
- Routes of administration: Oral
- Drug class: Dopamine D_{3} receptor antagonist
- ATC code: None

Identifiers
- IUPAC name: 2-[3-[4-[2-tert-butyl-6-(trifluoromethyl)pyrimidin-4-yl]piperazin-1-yl]propylsulfanyl]-1H-pyrimidin-6-one
- CAS Number: 220519-06-2
- PubChem CID: 9916104
- ChemSpider: 8091752
- UNII: E6CKI5C54O

Chemical and physical data
- Formula: C_{20}H_{27}F_{3}N_{6}OS
- Molar mass: 456.53 g·mol^{−1}
- 3D model (JSmol): Interactive image
- SMILES: CC(C)(C)C1=NC(=CC(=N1)N2CCN(CC2)CCCSC3=NC=CC(=O)N3)C(F)(F)F
- InChI: InChI=1S/C20H27F3N6OS/c1-19(2,3)17-25-14(20(21,22)23)13-15(26-17)29-10-8-28(9-11-29)7-4-12-31-18-24-6-5-16(30)27-18/h5-6,13H,4,7-12H2,1-3H3,(H,24,27,30); Key:KXVAICSRMHXLJN-UHFFFAOYSA-N

ABT-925, also known as A-437203 or as LU-201640, is a selective dopamine D_{3} receptor antagonist which was under development for the treatment of schizophrenia but was never marketed. It is taken orally.

The drug shows affinity for the dopamine D_{3} receptor and to a much lesser extent for the dopamine D_{2} receptor, with K_{i} values of 0.97–3.2 nM and 75 nM, respectively, and with 45- to 120-fold selectivity for the dopamine D_{3} receptor over the dopamine D_{2} receptor. It showed little activity in classical tests of antipsychotic-like activity in rodents, for instance inhibition of methamphetamine-induced hyperlocomotion and inhibition of apomorphine-induced climbing behavior. The drug does not produce catalepsy and does not affect prolactin levels in rodents. The occupancy of the dopamine D_{3} receptor by ABT-925 has been studied in humans.

ABT-925 was first described in the scientific literature by 1997. At the time, it was the most potent and selective dopamine D_{3} receptor antagonist yet known. In addition, the drug has been said to have been the first selective dopamine D_{3} receptor antagonist. It was under development by Abbott Laboratories. The drug reached phase 2 clinical trials prior to the discontinuation of its development. ABT-925 is known to have been in active phase 2 trials between 2001 and 2007. It failed to show antipsychotic effectiveness in acute schizophrenia in a phase 2 trial published in 2011.

== See also ==
- List of investigational antipsychotics
