= GSK-598809 =

Experimental selective dopamine D3 receptor antagonist

Clinical data
- Other names: GSK598809
- Drug class: Dopamine D_{3} receptor antagonist

Identifiers
- IUPAC name: 5-[5-[3-[(1S,5R)-1-[2-fluoro-4-(trifluoromethyl)phenyl]-3-azabicyclo[3.1.0]hexan-3-yl]propylsulfanyl]-4-methyl-1,2,4-triazol-3-yl]-4-methyl-1,3-oxazole
- CAS Number: 863680-46-0
- PubChem CID: 11784937
- ChemSpider: 32701679
- UNII: Y5OZ63HC3V
- ChEMBL: ChEMBL3590085
- CompTox Dashboard (EPA): DTXSID40156878

Chemical and physical data
- Formula: C_{22}H_{23}F_{4}N_{5}OS
- Molar mass: 481.51 g·mol^{−1}
- 3D model (JSmol): Interactive image
- SMILES: CC1=C(OC=N1)C2=NN=C(N2C)SCCCN3C[C@@H]4C[C@@]4(C3)C5=C(C=C(C=C5)C(F)(F)F)F
- InChI: InChI=1S/C22H23F4N5OS/c1-13-18(32-12-27-13)19-28-29-20(30(19)2)33-7-3-6-31-10-15-9-21(15,11-31)16-5-4-14(8-17(16)23)22(24,25)26/h4-5,8,12,15H,3,6-7,9-11H2,1-2H3/t15-,21-/m0/s1; Key:ZKRWPAYTJMRKLJ-BTYIYWSLSA-N

GSK-598809 is a selective dopamine D_{3} receptor antagonist that is or was under development for the treatment of substance-related disorders, smoking withdrawal, and eating disorders like binge eating disorder.

The drug is highly selective for the dopamine D_{3} receptor (K_{i} = 6.2 nM) over the dopamine D_{2} receptor (K_{i} = 740 nM) (~120-fold preference for the D_{3} receptor over the D_{2} receptor). A single dose of GSK-598809 achieved 72 to 89% occupancy of the D_{3} receptor in smokers.

Side effects of GSK-598809 in clinical trials have included headache and somnolence with no sedation or extrapyramidal symptoms. This is in contrast to dopamine D_{2} receptor antagonists, which are associated with sedation, motor side effects, reduced activity, and emotional blunting. However, GSK-598809 has been associated with cardiovascular side effects at high doses. It increases blood pressure in animals and this effect was especially strong in the presence of cocaine, which dampened enthusiasm for its clinical development for cocaine use disorder. However, other more recently developed and selective D_{3} receptor antagonists like (R)-VK4-116 and (R)-VK4-40 do not share these cardiovascular side effects.

GSK-598809 was first described in the scientific literature by 2009. As of August 2023, no recent development of GSK-598809 has been reported for substance-related disorders, smoking withdrawal, or eating disorders since July 2016. GSK-598809 reached at least phase 1 clinical trials. According to a 2021 review, the clinical effects of GSK-598809 and other experimental dopamine D_{3} receptor antagonists were mixed or unsatisfactory and thus their development was discontinued early into clinical trials. In any case, signs of clinical efficacy were reported to have been observed.

== See also ==
- Nafadotride
- PNU-99,194
- SB-277,011-A
