= List of investigational eating disorder drugs =

Investigational eating disorder drugs

This is a list of investigational eating disorder drugs, or drugs that are currently under development for clinical use for the treatment of eating disorders but are not yet approved. Eating disorders include anorexia nervosa, bulimia nervosa, and binge-eating disorder, among others. This page does not include drugs under development for treatment of overweightness/obesity (excessive appetite) or anorexia (low appetite).

Chemical/generic names are listed first, with developmental code names, synonyms, and brand names in parentheses. The format of list items is "Name (Synonyms) – Mechanism of Action – Indication [Reference]".

This list was last comprehensively updated in January 2026. It is likely to become outdated with time.

== Under development ==
=== Phase 3 ===
- Armodafinil ((R)-modafinil; CEP-10953; Nuvigil) – atypical dopamine reuptake inhibitor (DRI) – eating disorders
- Solriamfetol (ADX-N05; ARL-N05; JZP-110; SKL-N05; Sunosi) – norepinephrine–dopamine reuptake inhibitor (NDRI) – binge-eating disorder

=== Phase 2 ===
- BP-14979 (BP-1.4979; BP1-4979) – dopamine D_{3} receptor partial agonist – binge-eating disorder
- Lidocaine (ORE-001) – sodium channel blocker – anorexia nervosa
- Naloxone nasal spray (LT-12; LT-20; LT-21; LT-22; Naloxon B; Narcan nasal spray; OPNT-001) – μ-opioid receptor antagonist – eating disorders
- Nivasorexant (ACT-539313; SORA) – orexin OX_{1} receptor antagonist – binge-eating disorder
- Oxytocin (intranasal potentiated oxytocin; TI-001; TI-114; TNX-1900; TNX-2900) – oxytocin receptor agonist – binge-eating disorder
- Psilocybin (COMP-360; COMP360) – non-selective serotonin receptor agonist, serotonin 5-HT_{2A} receptor agonist, and serotonergic psychedelic – anorexia nervosa
- Psilocybin (PFN™; TRP-8802; TRP-8803; TRP-8804; TRYP-0082) – non-selective serotonin receptor agonist, serotonin 5-HT_{2A} receptor agonist, and serotonergic psychedelic – binge-eating disorder
- Vortioxetine (Brintellix; LU-AA21004; LuAA 21004; Trintellix; Vortidif) – serotonin reuptake inhibitor, serotonin 5-HT_{1A} and 5-HT_{1B} receptor agonist, and serotonin 5-HT_{1D}, 5-HT_{3}, and 5-HT_{7} receptor antagonist – binge-eating disorder

=== Phase 1 ===
- CVN-766 (CVN766) – orexin OX_{1} receptor antagonist – binge-eating disorder

=== Preclinical ===
- Metyrapone/oxazepam (EMB-001C; EMB-001) – combination of metyrapone (11β-hydroxylase inhibitor and cortisol synthesis inhibitor) and oxazepam (benzodiazepine/GABA_{A} receptor positive allosteric modulator) – eating disorders
- TACT411 – serotonin 5-HT_{1B} receptor modulator and monoamine transporter modulator – anorexia nervosa, binge-eating disorder
- TACT523 – undefined mechanism of action – anorexia nervosa, binge-eating disorder
- TACT833 – serotonin 5-HT_{1B} receptor modulator and monoamine transporter modulator – anorexia nervosa, binge-eating disorder

== Not under development ==
=== No development reported ===
- BMB-101 (BMB101) – serotonin 5-HT_{2C} receptor agonist – binge-eating disorder
- GSK-598809 (GSK598809) – dopamine D_{3} receptor antagonist – eating disorders
- Ibogaine – various actions – anorexia nervosa
- Ketamine (AWKN-001; AWKN-P-001) – ionotropic glutamate NMDA receptor antagonist and dissociative hallucinogen – binge-eating disorder
- Mescaline (BMND-04/BMND04) – non-selective serotonin receptor agonist and psychedelic hallucinogen – eating disorders
- Olanzapine (BR-5402; LY-170053; LY-170052; Midax; Zypadhera; Zyprexa) – atypical antipsychotic (non-selective monoamine receptor modulator) – anorexia nervosa
- Psilocybin (PSY-0.1, PSY-0.2, PSY-0.3, PSY-0.4/0.5, PSY-0.6) – non-selective serotonin receptor agonist and psychedelic hallucinogen – eating disorders

=== Discontinued ===
- Amphetamine modified release (HLD-900; HLD-100) – norepinephrine–dopamine releasing agent (NDRA) – bulimia nervosa
- Centanafadine (CTN-SR; EB-1020) – serotonin–norepinephrine–dopamine reuptake inhibitor (SNDRI) – binge-eating disorder
- Dasotraline (DSP-225289; SEP-225289; SEP-0225289; SEP-289) – serotonin–norepinephrine–dopamine reuptake inhibitor (SNDRI) – binge-eating disorder
- Femoxetine (femoxitine; FG-4963; Malexil; NNC-204963) – selective serotonin reuptake inhibitor (SSRI) – eating disorders
- Ghrelin synthetic (OXE-103; SUN-11031) – ghrelin receptor agonist – anorexia nervosa
- GW-181771 (GI-181771; GSKI-181771X) – cholecystokinin CCK_{A} receptor agonist – bulimia nervosa
- Meclinertant (reminertant; SR-48692) – neurotensin NTS_{1} receptor antagonist – anorexia nervosa
- Naloxone nasal spray (LT-12; LT-20; LT-21; LT-22; Naloxon B; Narcan nasal spray; OPNT-001) – μ-opioid receptor antagonist – bulimia nervosa
- Samidorphan (ALKS-33; RDC-0313; RDC-0313-00) – μ-opioid receptor antagonist – eating disorders
- Sertraline (Aremis; Besitran; CP-51974; CP-51974-01; Gladem; J Zoloft; Lustral; Serad; Serlain; Tatig; Zoloft) – selective serotonin reuptake inhibitor (SSRI) – night eating syndrome
- Tandospirone (metanopirone; Sediel; SM-3997) – serotonin 5-HT_{1A} receptor agonist – eating disorders
- Ticalopride ((+)-norcisapride) – serotonin 5-HT_{3} receptor antagonist, serotonin 5-HT_{4} receptor agonist – bulimia nervosa

== Clinically used drugs ==
=== Approved drugs ===
- Dronabinol (tetrahydrocannabinol; THC; Δ_{9}-THC; Deltanyne; Elevat; Marinol; NSC-134454) – cannabinoid CB_{1} and CB_{2} receptor agonist – anorexia nervosa
- Fluoxetine (LY-110140; Prozac; Reneuron; Sarafem) – selective serotonin reuptake inhibitor (SSRI) – bulimia nervosa
- Fluoxetine – selective serotonin reuptake inhibitor (SSRI) – bulimia nervosa
- Lisdexamfetamine (LDX; Elvanse; NRP-104; S-877489; SHP-489; SPD-489; Tyvense; Venvanse; Vyvanse) – norepinephrine–dopamine releasing agent (NDRA) – eating disorders

== See also ==
- Lists of investigational drugs
