= C15H20ClN3O2 =

The molecular formula C_{15}H_{20}ClN_{3}O_{2} (molar mass: 309.79 g/mol) may refer to:

- Zacopride
- CGP-25454A
