= Nivasorexant =

Chemical compound

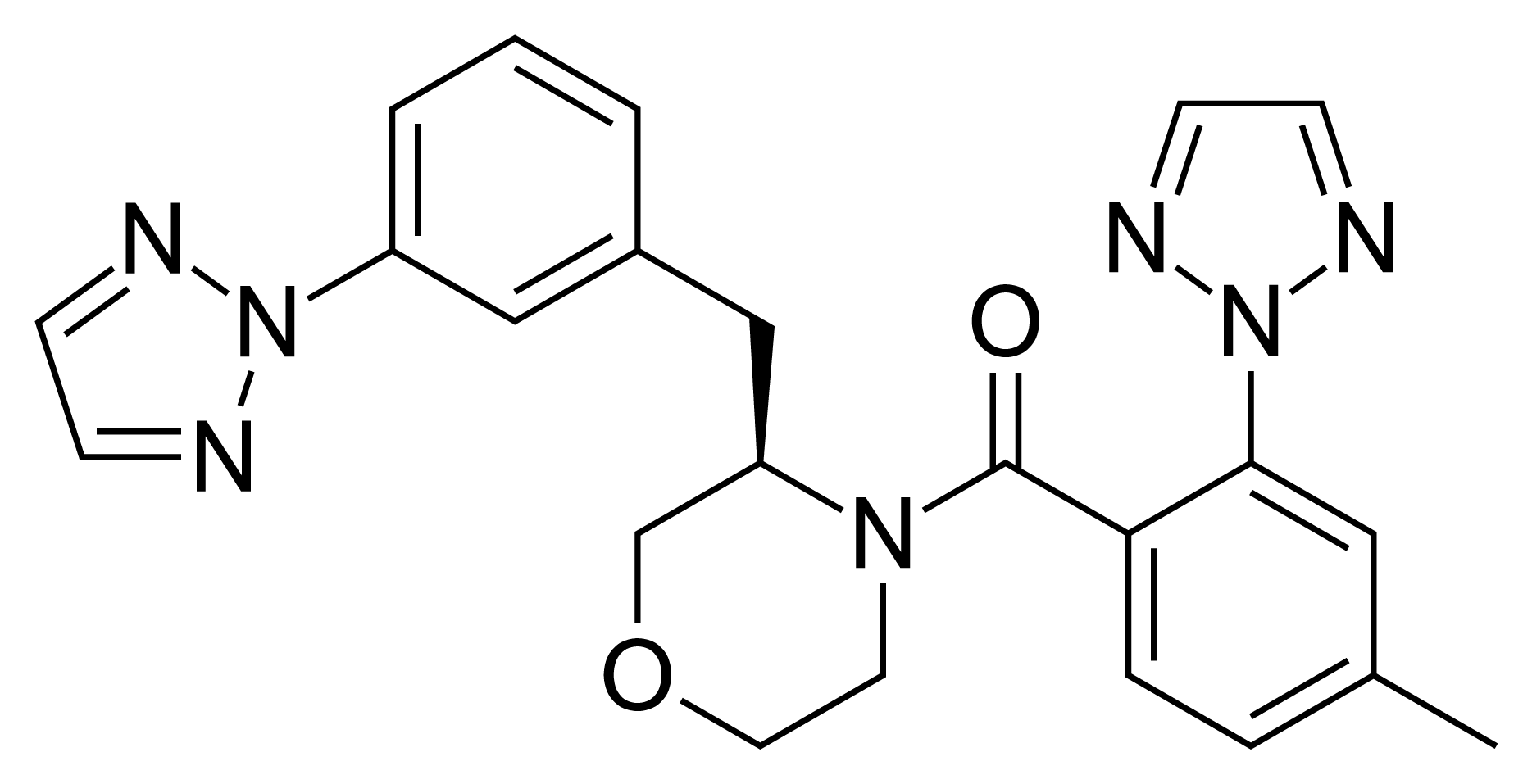

Clinical data
- Other names: ACT-539313; ACT539313
- Routes of administration: Oral
- Drug class: Orexin receptor antagonist

Pharmacokinetic data
- Elimination half-life: 3.3–6.5 hours

Identifiers
- IUPAC name: 4-methyl-2-[1,2,3]triazol-2-yl-phenyl)-[(R)-3-(3-[1,2,3]triazol-2-yl-benzyl)morpholin-4-yl]methanone
- CAS Number: 1435480-40-2
- PubChem CID: 71566267
- UNII: 0N15II81VX

Chemical and physical data
- Formula: C_{23}H_{23}N_{7}O_{2}
- Molar mass: 429.484 g·mol^{−1}
- 3D model (JSmol): Interactive image
- SMILES: CC1=CC(=C(C=C1)C(=O)N2CCOC[C@H]2CC3=CC(=CC=C3)N4N=CC=N4)N5N=CC=N5
- InChI: InChI=1S/C23H23N7O2/c1-17-5-6-21(22(13-17)30-26-9-10-27-30)23(31)28-11-12-32-16-20(28)15-18-3-2-4-19(14-18)29-24-7-8-25-29/h2-10,13-14,20H,11-12,15-16H2,1H3/t20-/m1/s1; Key:GKPHAIOJCHBZCT-HXUWFJFHSA-N

Nivasorexant (INN; developmental code name ACT-539313) is an orexin receptor antagonist which is under development for the treatment of binge eating disorder and was previously under development for the treatment of anxiety disorders.

It is an orally active small-molecule compound with an elimination half-life of 3.3 to 6.5 hours and acts as a selective orexin OX_{1} receptor antagonist (1-SORA or SO1RA). It was the first SO1RA drug to enter clinical development.

As of May 2022, the drug was in phase 2 clinical trials for binge eating disorder. The phase 2 trial found that Nivasorexant did not improve binge-eating compared to the placebo, after which Idorsia (the developer of nivasorexant) signaled in May 2022 that it would not pursue further development of the drug.

== See also ==
- List of investigational eating disorder drugs
