= Nafadotride =

Nervous system drug

Names
- IUPAC name N-{[(2S)-1-butylpyrrolidin-2-yl]methyl}-4-cyano-1-methoxy-2-naphthamide

Identifiers
CAS Number	149649-22-9
3D model (JSmol)	Interactive image
ChEBI	CHEBI:64191
ChEMBL	ChEMBL286252
ChemSpider	2652798
IUPHAR/BPS	44
MeSH	Nafadotride
PubChem CID	3408722
UNII	JP25MZ26IQ
CompTox Dashboard (EPA)	DTXSID1042603
- InChI: InChI=1S/C22H27N3O2/c1-3-4-11-25-12-7-8-17(25)15-24-22(26)20-13-16(14-23)18-9-5-6-10-19(18)21(20)27-2/h5-6,9-10,13,17H,3-4,7-8,11-12,15H2,1-2H3,(H,24,26) Key: IDZASIQMRGPBCQ-UHFFFAOYSA-N
- SMILES: CCCCN1CCCC1CNC(=O)C2=C(C3=CC=CC=C3C(=C2)C#N)OC

Properties
Chemical formula	C_{22}H_{27}N_{3}O_{2}
Molar mass	365.477 g·mol^{−1}
- Except where otherwise noted, data are given for materials in their standard state (at 25 °C [77 °F], 100 kPa). verify (what is ?) Infobox references

Nafadotride is a dopamine antagonist with some selectivity for the D_{3} subtype (9.6-fold preference for D_{3} over D_{2}).

== See also ==
- GSK-598809
- PNU-99,194
- SB-277,011-A
