= Chloroethylnorapomorphine =

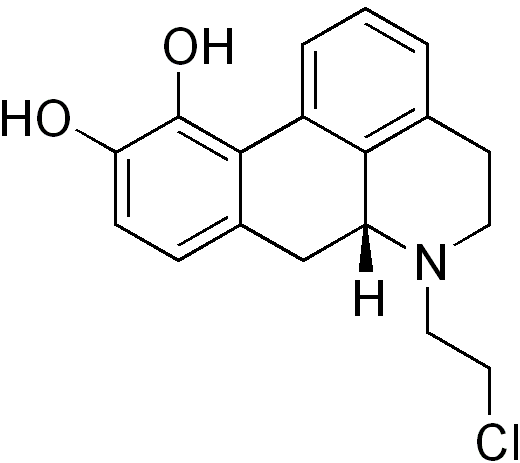

Names
- IUPAC name 12a-Chloro-12a-homo-6aβ-aporphine-10,11-diol
- Systematic IUPAC name (6aR)-6-(2-Chloroethyl)-5,6,6a,7-tetrahydro-4H-dibenzo[de,g]quinoline-10,11-diol
- Other names (−)-N-(2-Chloroethyl)-norapomorphine

Identifiers
CAS Number	75946-94-0
3D model (JSmol)	Interactive image
ChEMBL	ChEMBL283871
ChemSpider	137707
PubChem CID	156376
UNII	VD4272R3UB
CompTox Dashboard (EPA)	DTXSID90226853
- InChI: InChI=1S/C18H18ClNO2/c19-7-9-20-8-6-11-2-1-3-13-16(11)14(20)10-12-4-5-15(21)18(22)17(12)13/h1-5,14,21-22H,6-10H2/t14-/m1/s1 Key: RMKWDBUEXHJPRZ-CQSZACIVSA-N
- SMILES: C1CN([C@@H]2CC3=C(C4=C2C1=CC=C4)C(=C(C=C3)O)O)CCCl

Properties
Chemical formula	C_{18}H_{18}ClNO_{2}
Molar mass	315.80 g·mol^{−1}
- Except where otherwise noted, data are given for materials in their standard state (at 25 °C [77 °F], 100 kPa). verify (what is ?) Infobox references

Chloroethylnorapomorphine is a chemical once thought to be an irreversible dopamine D_{2} receptor antagonist; however, it was later proved to be reversible.
