= HOMER2 =

Protein and coding gene in humans

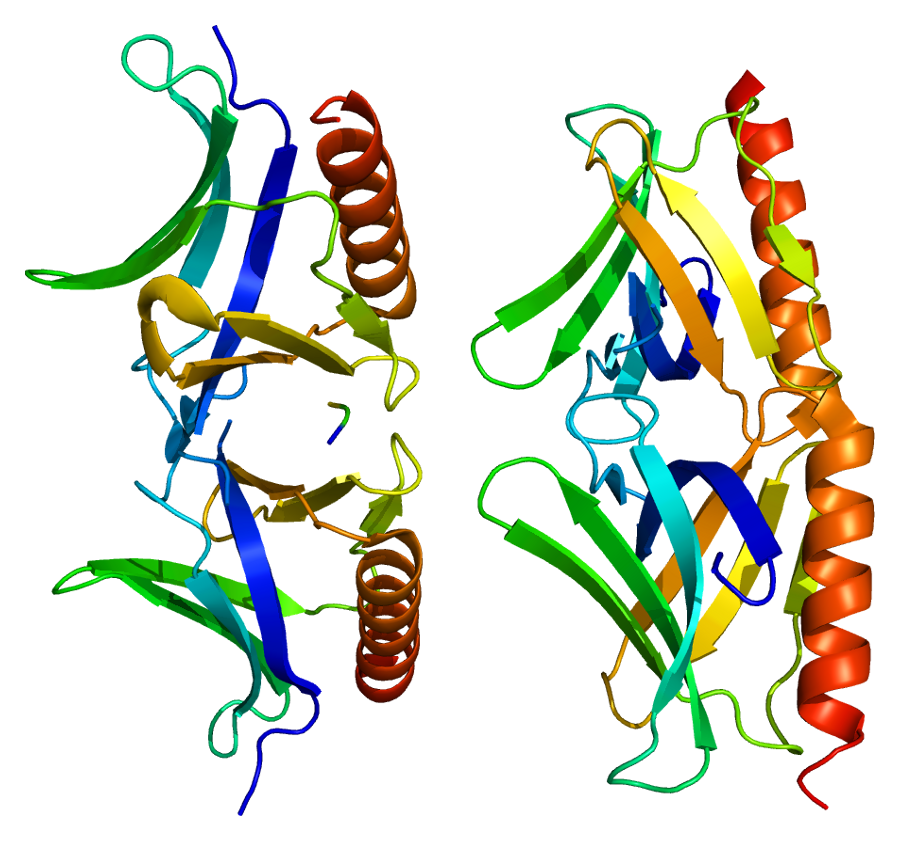

Identifiers
- Aliases: HOMER2, ACPD, CPD, HOMER-2, VESL-2, DFNA68, homer scaffolding protein 2, homer scaffold protein 2
- External IDs: OMIM: 604799; MGI: 1347354; GeneCards: HOMER2
Available structures
PDB	Ortholog search: PDBe RCSB
PDB	List of PDB id codes 1I7A

Gene location (Human)
Chr.	Chromosome 15 (human)
Band	15q25.2	Start	82,836,946 bp
Band	15q25.2	End	82,986,153 bp

Gene location (Mouse)
Chr.	Chromosome 7 (mouse)
Band	7|7 D3	Start	81,250,229 bp
Band	7|7 D3	End	81,357,275 bp
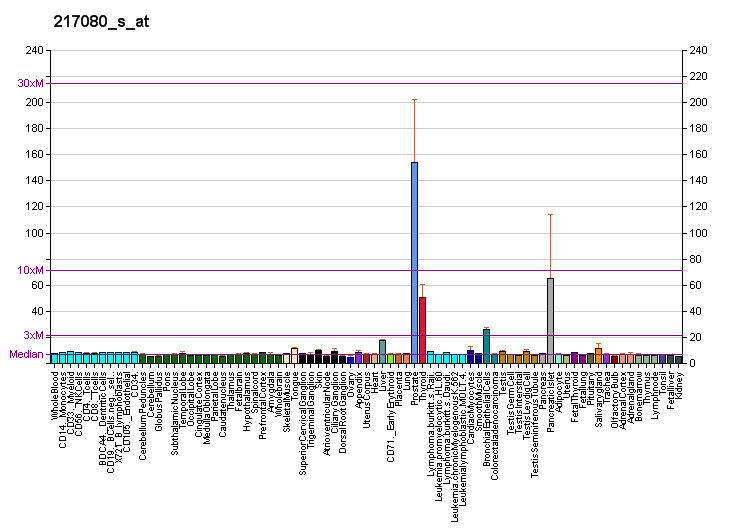
RNA expression pattern
Bgee	Human / Mouse (ortholog); Top expressed in: body of pancreas; olfactory zone of nasal mucosa; muscle of thigh; minor salivary glands; gastrocnemius muscle; islet of Langerhans; Skeletal muscle tissue of rectus abdominis; skin of leg; parotid gland; skin of abdomen / Top expressed in: lacrimal gland; parotid gland; transitional epithelium of urinary bladder; lateral septal nucleus; substantia nigra; Region I of hippocampus proper; crypt of lieberkuhn of small intestine; epithelium of stomach; olfactory epithelium; trigeminal ganglion; More reference expression data
BioGPS	More reference expression data
Gene ontology
Molecular function	protein binding; protein homodimerization activity; protein domain specific binding; synaptic receptor adaptor activity; actin binding; G protein-coupled glutamate receptor binding; glutamate receptor binding; protein heterodimerization activity
Cellular component	cytoplasm; soma; postsynaptic membrane; dendrite; synapse; postsynaptic density; membrane; apical part of cell; stereocilium tip; cell projection; stereocilium; plasma membrane; cell junction; cytosol; glutamatergic synapse; neuron projection
Biological process	G protein-coupled glutamate receptor signaling pathway; chemical homeostasis within a tissue; behavioral response to cocaine; regulation of G protein-coupled receptor signaling pathway; hearing; calcium-mediated signaling using intracellular calcium source; negative regulation of interleukin-2 production; negative regulation of calcineurin-NFAT signaling cascade; regulation of store-operated calcium entry; positive regulation of signal transduction
Sources:Amigo / QuickGO
Orthologs
Databases	NCBI: entry; OMA: entry
Species	Human	Mouse
Entrez	9455	26557
Ensembl	ENSG00000103942	ENSMUSG00000025813
UniProt	Q9NSB8	Q9QWW1
RefSeq (mRNA)	NM_004839; NM_199330; NM_199331; NM_199332	NM_001164086; NM_001164087; NM_011983; NM_177029
RefSeq (protein)	NP_004830; NP_955362	NP_001157558; NP_001157559; NP_036113
Location (UCSC)	Chr 15: 82.84 – 82.99 Mb	Chr 7: 81.25 – 81.36 Mb
PubMed search
- Wikidata
View/Edit Human	View/Edit Mouse

Homer protein homolog 2 is a protein that in humans is encoded by the HOMER2 gene.

This gene encodes a member of the homer family of dendritic proteins. Members of this family regulate group 1 metabotropic glutamate receptor function. The encoded protein may be involved in cell growth. Four transcript variants encoding distinct isoforms have been identified for this gene.

== Interactions ==
HOMER2 has been shown to interact with RYR1.

== See also ==
- HOMER1
- HOMER3
