= HOMER1 =

Protein and coding gene in humans

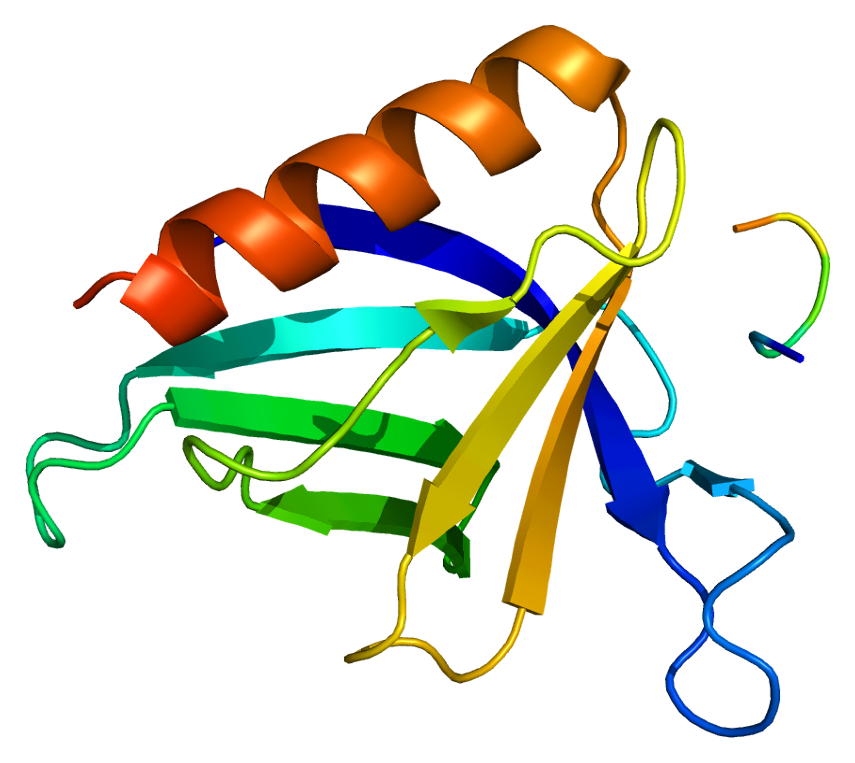

Identifiers
- Aliases: HOMER1, HOMER, HOMER1A, HOMER1B, HOMER1C, SYN47, Ves-1, homer scaffolding protein 1, homer scaffold protein 1
- External IDs: OMIM: 604798; MGI: 1347345; GeneCards: HOMER1

Gene location (Human)
| Chr. | Chromosome 5 (human) |
| Band | 5q14.1 | Start | 79,372,636 bp |
| Band | 5q14.1 | End | 79,514,134 bp |

Gene location (Mouse)
| Chr. | Chromosome 13 (mouse) |
| Band | 13|13 C3 | Start | 93,436,143 bp |
| Band | 13|13 C3 | End | 93,541,637 bp |
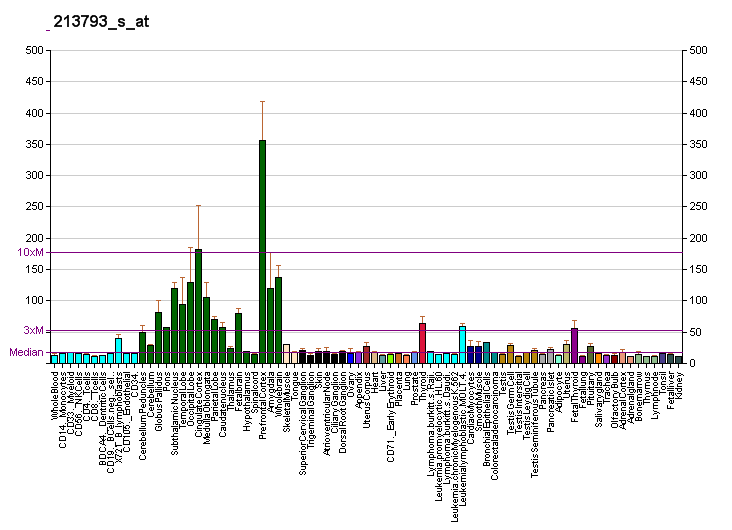
RNA expression pattern
| Bgee | Human / Mouse (ortholog); Top expressed in: Brodmann area 23; middle temporal gyrus; orbitofrontal cortex; Skeletal muscle tissue of biceps brachii; endothelial cell; Epithelium of choroid plexus; right ventricle; frontal pole; vastus lateralis muscle; superior frontal gyrus / Top expressed in: dorsal striatum; triceps brachii muscle; temporal muscle; olfactory tubercle; superior frontal gyrus; nucleus accumbens; sternocleidomastoid muscle; prefrontal cortex; muscle of thigh; dentate gyrus of hippocampal formation granule cell; More reference expression data |
| BioGPS | More reference expression data |
Gene ontology
| Molecular function | transmembrane transporter binding; signaling adaptor activity; protein binding; G protein-coupled glutamate receptor binding |
| Cellular component | cytoplasm; postsynaptic membrane; membrane; postsynaptic density; plasma membrane; apical part of cell; synapse; axon; cell junction; Z discdkac; neuron projection; costamere; postsynapse; cytosol; neuron spine; cell projection; dendritic spine; dendrite; glutamatergic synapse; postsynaptic cytosol |
| Biological process | phospholipase C-activating G protein-coupled glutamate receptor signaling pathway; positive regulation of signal transduction; behavioral response to cocaine; skeletal muscle contraction; regulation of calcium ion import; response to calcium ion; chemical homeostasis within a tissue; skeletal muscle fiber development; positive regulation of calcium ion transport; chemical synaptic transmission; regulation of cation channel activity; regulation of store-operated calcium entry; protein tetramerization; regulation of synaptic transmission, glutamatergic; regulation of dendritic spine maintenance; G protein-coupled glutamate receptor signaling pathway; regulation of postsynaptic neurotransmitter receptor activity |
Sources:Amigo / QuickGO
Orthologs
| Databases | NCBI: entry; OMA: entry |
| Species | Human | Mouse |
| Entrez | 9456 | 26556 |
| Ensembl | ENSG00000152413 | ENSMUSG00000007617 |
| UniProt | Q86YM7 | Q9Z2Y3 |
| RefSeq (mRNA) | NM_004272; NM_001277077; NM_001277078 | NM_001284189; NM_011982; NM_147176; NM_152134; NM_001347598 |
| RefSeq (protein) | NP_001264006; NP_001264007; NP_004263 | NP_001271118; NP_001334527; NP_036112; NP_671705; NP_687036 |
| Location (UCSC) | Chr 5: 79.37 – 79.51 Mb | Chr 13: 93.44 – 93.54 Mb |
| PubMed search |
- Wikidata
| View/Edit Human | View/Edit Mouse |

Homer protein homolog 1 or Homer1 is a neuronal protein that in humans is encoded by the HOMER1 gene. Other names are Vesl and PSD-Zip45.

== Structure ==
Homer1 protein has an N-terminal EVH1 domain, involved in protein interaction, and a C-terminal coiled-coil domain involved in self association. It consists of two major splice variants, short-form (Homer1a) and long-form (Homer1b and c). Homer1a has only EVH1 domain and is monomeric while Homer1b and 1c have both EVH1 and coiled-coil domains and are tetrameric. The coiled-coil can be further separated into N-terminal half and C-terminal half. The N-terminal half of the coiled-coil domain is predicted to be a parallel dimer while the C-terminus half is a hybrid of dimeric and anti-parallel tetrameric coiled-coil. As a whole, long Homer is predicted to have a dumbbell-like structure where two pairs of EVH1 domains are located on two sides of long (~50 nm) coiled-coil domain. Mammals have Homer2 and Homer3, in addition to Homer1, which have similar domain structure. They also have similar alternatively spliced forms.

Dimeric-tetrameric coiled-coil domain of Homer1b. PDB rendering based on 3CVE.

== Tissue distribution ==
Homer1 is expressed widely in the central nervous system as well as peripheral tissue including heart, kidney, ovary, testis, and skeletal muscle. Subcellularly in neurons, Homer1 is concentrated in postsynaptic structures and constitutes a major part of the postsynaptic density.

== Function ==
EVH1 domain interacts with PPXXF motif. This sequence motif exists in group 1 metabotropic glutamate receptor (mGluR1 and mGluR5), IP_{3} receptors (IP_{3}R), Shank, transient receptor potential canonical (TRPC) family channels, drebrin, oligophrenin, dynamin3, CENTG1, and ryanodin receptor. Through its tetrameric structure, long forms of Homer (such as Homer1b and Homer1c) are proposed to cross link different proteins. For example, group 1 mGluR is crossed linked with its signaling downstream, IP_{3} receptor. Also, through crosslinking another multimeric protein Shank, it is proposed to comprise a core of the postsynaptic density.

Notably, the expression of Homer1a is induced by neuronal activity while that of Homer1b and 1c are constitutive. Thus Homer1a is classified as an immediate early gene. Homer1a, acts as a natural dominant negative form that blocks interaction between long-forms and their ligand proteins by competing with the EVH1 binding site on the ligand proteins. In this way, the short form of Homer uncouples mGluR signaling and also shrinks dendritic spine structure. Therefore, the short form of Homer is considered to be a part of a mechanism of homeostatic plasticity that dampens the neuronal responsiveness when input activity is too high. The long form Homer1c plays a role in synaptic plasticity and the stabilization of synaptic changes during long-term potentiation.

The coiled-coil domain is reported to interact with syntaxin13 and activated Cdc42. The interaction with Cdc42 inhibit the activity of Cdc42 to remodel dendritic spine structure.

== Rapid antidepressant effects ==
Homer1a switches mGluR5 signaling to increase AMPA receptor activity for the rapid antidepressant actions of sleep deprivation.

== See also ==
- HOMER2
- HOMER3
