= HOMER3 =

Protein and coding gene in humans

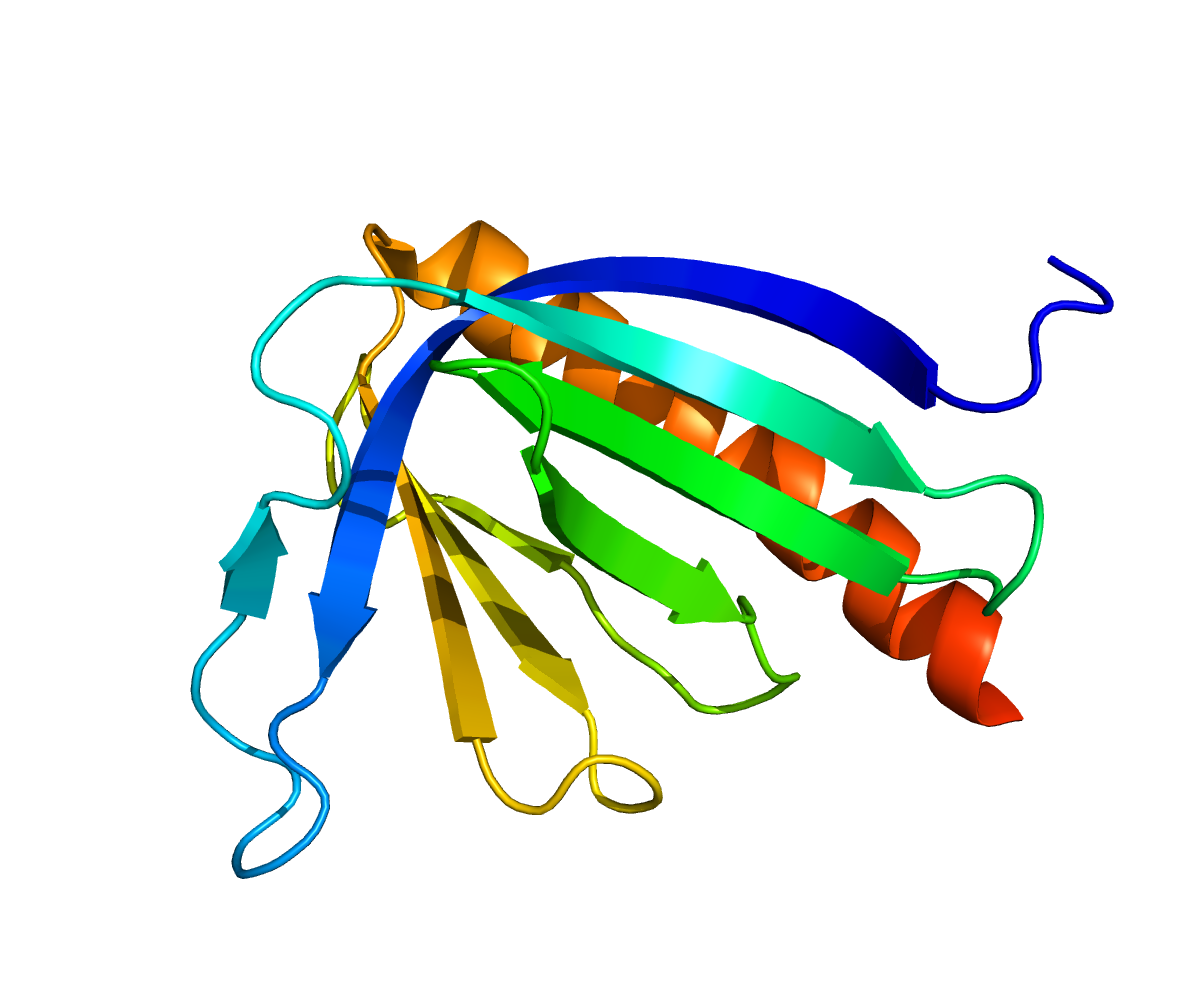

Identifiers
- Aliases: HOMER3, HOMER-3, VESL3, homer scaffolding protein 3, homer scaffold protein 3
- External IDs: OMIM: 604800; MGI: 1347359; GeneCards: HOMER3
Available structures
PDB	Ortholog search: PDBe RCSB
PDB	List of PDB id codes 2P8V, 3CVF

Gene location (Human)
Chr.	Chromosome 19 (human)
Band	19p13.11	Start	18,929,201 bp
Band	19p13.11	End	18,941,261 bp

Gene location (Mouse)
Chr.	Chromosome 8 (mouse)
Band	8|8 B3.3	Start	70,282,827 bp
Band	8|8 B3.3	End	70,294,361 bp
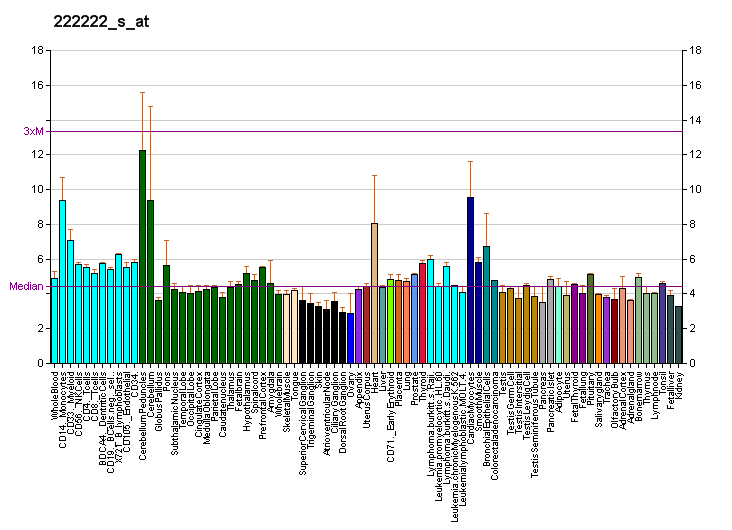

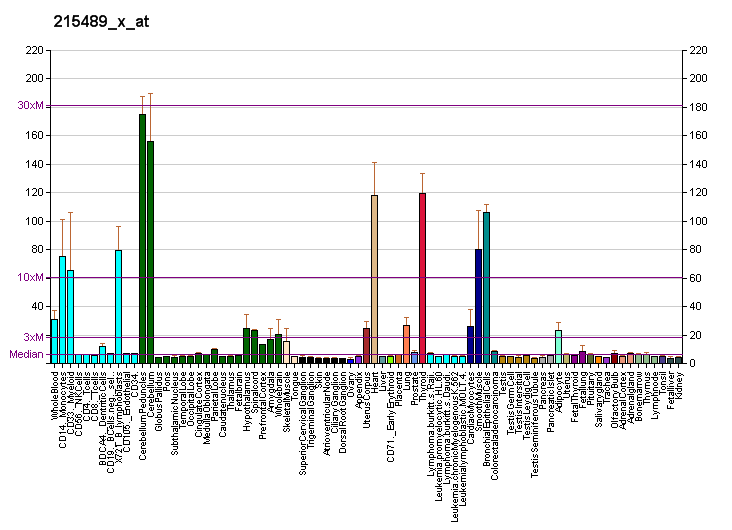

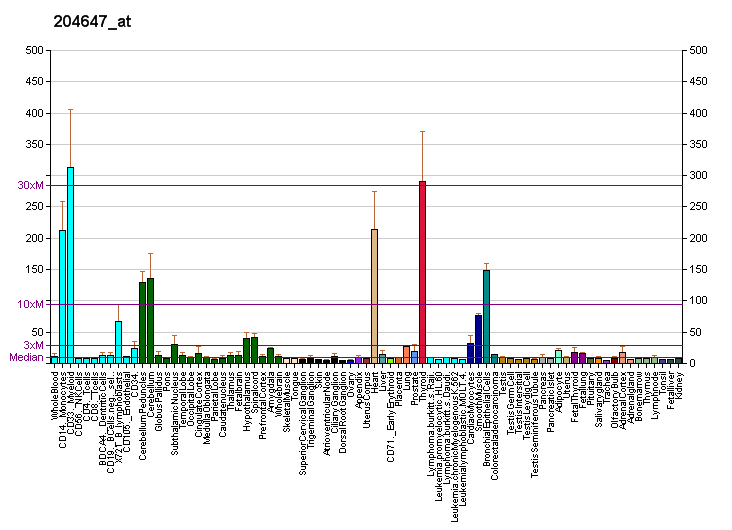
RNA expression pattern
Bgee	Human / Mouse (ortholog); Top expressed in: cerebellar vermis; right hemisphere of cerebellum; C1 segment; spleen; muscle of thigh; gastrocnemius muscle; inferior ganglion of vagus nerve; stromal cell of endometrium; ganglionic eminence; right lobe of thyroid gland / Top expressed in: cerebellar cortex; lobe of cerebellum; ventricular zone; yolk sac; cerebellar vermis; dentate gyrus of hippocampal formation granule cell; neural layer of retina; lip; ganglionic eminence; embryo; More reference expression data
BioGPS	More reference expression data
Gene ontology
Molecular function	protein C-terminus binding; protein binding; protein domain specific binding; G protein-coupled glutamate receptor binding; identical protein binding
Cellular component	basal part of cell; cell junction; postsynaptic membrane; synapse; postsynaptic density; membrane; cytoplasm; cytosol; plasma membrane; cellular component; glutamatergic synapse; dendrite; neuron projection
Biological process	G protein-coupled glutamate receptor signaling pathway; protein targeting; negative regulation of interleukin-2 production; negative regulation of calcineurin-NFAT signaling cascade; regulation of postsynaptic neurotransmitter receptor activity; regulation of store-operated calcium entry
Sources:Amigo / QuickGO
Orthologs
Databases	NCBI: entry; OMA: entry
Species	Human	Mouse
Entrez	9454	26558
Ensembl	ENSG00000051128	ENSMUSG00000003573
UniProt	Q9NSC5	Q99JP6
RefSeq (mRNA)	NM_001145721; NM_001145722; NM_001145724; NM_004838	NM_001146153; NM_011984
RefSeq (protein)	NP_001139193; NP_001139194; NP_001139196; NP_004829; NP_001139194.1 NP_001139196.1	NP_001139625; NP_036114
Location (UCSC)	Chr 19: 18.93 – 18.94 Mb	Chr 8: 70.28 – 70.29 Mb
PubMed search
- Wikidata
View/Edit Human	View/Edit Mouse

Homer protein homolog 3 is a protein that in humans is encoded by the HOMER3 gene.

== Function ==
This gene encodes a member of the homer family of dendritic proteins. Members of this family regulate group 1 metabotropic glutamate receptor function. The encoded protein may be involved in cell growth.

== Interactions ==
HOMER3 has been shown to interact with TRPC1 and RYR1.

== See also ==
- HOMER1
- HOMER2
