= C957T =

Gene mutation associated with schizophrenia

The C957T gene polymorphism is a synonymous mutation located within the 957th base pair of the DRD2 gene. This base pair is located in exon 7. Most synonymous mutations are silent. However, the C957T mutation is an exception to this rule. While the 957C allele codes for the same polypeptide as the 957T allele, the conformation of 957T messenger RNA differs from the conformation of 957C messenger RNA. 957T messenger RNA is less stable and more prone to degradation. Dopamine D2 receptor expression is increased among individuals who carry the 957T allele compared to individuals who carry the 957C allele (in contrast to the original article publication, which has since been corrected).

== Behaviours associated with the C/C genotype of the C957T polymorphism ==
- schizophrenia
- diminished working memory ability
- altered response to nicotine
- reward related impulsivity
- sucrose addiction
- altered susceptibility to iatrogenic tardive dyskinesia
- altered fear conditioning
- dissocial personality disorder
- posttraumatic stress disorder

== Rapid screening of the C957T and the TaqIA polymorphisms ==
Given the importance of the C957T and TaqIA polymorphisms for the diagnosis and treatment of psychological disorder, a rapid screening protocol for these genes has been developed. Since the DRD2 1101A allele nulls the effects of the 957T allele, screens for the 957C allele which ignore the 1101A allele can sometimes lead to false negatives.
