= Nuclear mitotic apparatus protein 1 =

Protein-coding gene in the species Homo sapiens

NUMA1
Available structures
PDB	Ortholog search: PDBe RCSB
PDB	List of PDB id codes 3RO2

Identifiers
- Aliases: NUMA1, NUMA, NMP-22, nuclear mitotic apparatus protein 1
- External IDs: OMIM: 164009; MGI: 2443665; HomoloGene: 38150; GeneCards: NUMA1; OMA:NUMA1 - orthologs

Gene location (Human)
Chr.	Chromosome 11 (human)
Band	11q13.4	Start	72,002,864 bp
Band	11q13.4	End	72,080,693 bp

Gene location (Mouse)
Chr.	Chromosome 7 (mouse)
Band	7|7 E2	Start	101,583,318 bp
Band	7|7 E2	End	101,664,171 bp
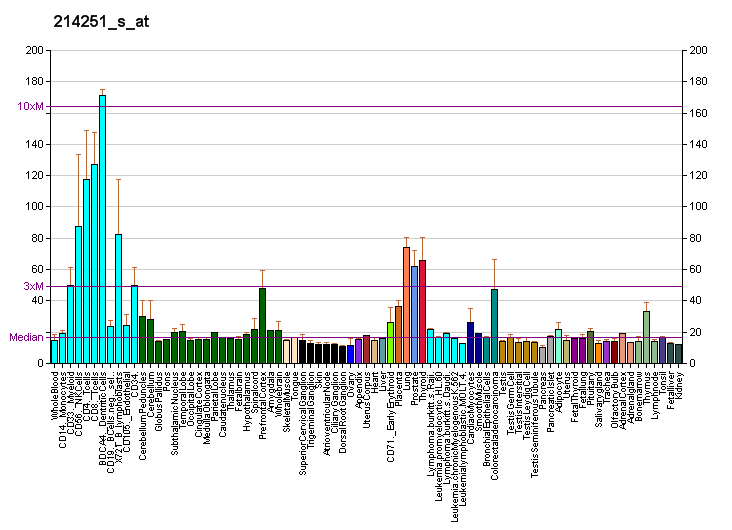

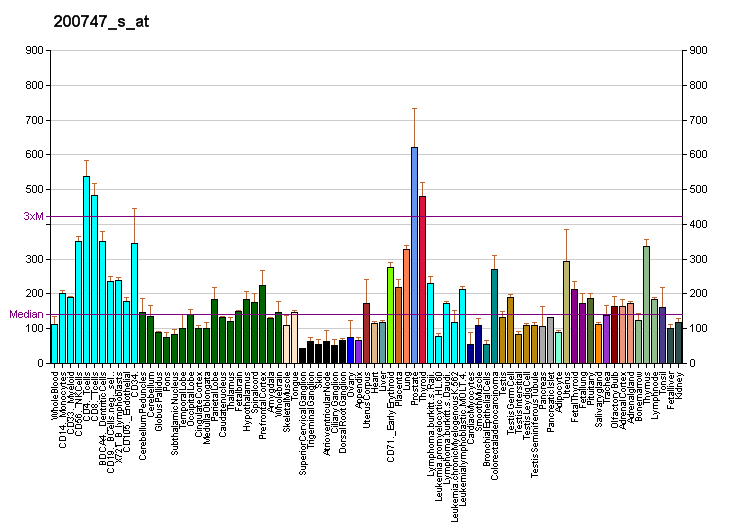
RNA expression pattern
Bgee	Human / Mouse (ortholog); Top expressed in: right uterine tube; body of uterus; canal of the cervix; left ovary; right ovary; gastric mucosa; muscle layer of sigmoid colon; ectocervix; right lobe of thyroid gland; ventricular zone / Top expressed in: genital tubercle; Rostral migratory stream; ventricular zone; vas deferens; neural layer of retina; cumulus cell; efferent ductule; Gonadal ridge; thymus; internal carotid artery; More reference expression data
BioGPS	More reference expression data
Gene ontology
Molecular function	structural molecule activity; protein binding; microtubule binding; protein C-terminus binding; tubulin binding; phosphatidylinositol binding; microtubule plus-end binding; microtubule minus-end binding; dynein complex binding; disordered domain specific binding; lipid binding; protein domain specific binding; protein-containing complex binding
Cellular component	extracellular exosome; spindle; mitotic spindle; chromosome; microtubule organizing center; Golgi membrane; apical part of cell; mitotic spindle astral microtubule; centrosome; microtubule; soma; dendrite; cytoskeleton; spindle microtubule; spindle pole; nucleus; cytoplasm; cytosol; nuclear matrix; extrinsic component of plasma membrane; spindle pole centrosome; microtubule plus-end; microtubule minus-end; cortical microtubule; microtubule bundle; mitotic spindle pole; cell cortex region; cytoplasmic microtubule bundle; mitotic spindle midzone; nucleoplasm; plasma membrane; cell cortex; membrane; lateral cell cortex; lateral plasma membrane; protein-containing complex
Biological process	lung epithelial cell differentiation; cell cycle; cell division; meiosis; nucleus organization; establishment of mitotic spindle orientation; microtubule bundle formation; positive regulation of BMP signaling pathway; astral microtubule organization; positive regulation of microtubule polymerization; positive regulation of intracellular transport; positive regulation of keratinocyte differentiation; positive regulation of hair follicle development; positive regulation of chromosome segregation; anastral spindle assembly; regulation of mitotic spindle organization; regulation of metaphase plate congression; positive regulation of protein localization to spindle pole body; positive regulation of mitotic spindle elongation; positive regulation of protein localization to cell cortex; positive regulation of chromosome separation; positive regulation of spindle assembly; chromosome segregation
Sources:Amigo / QuickGO
Orthologs
Species	Human	Mouse
Entrez	4926	101706
Ensembl	ENSG00000137497	ENSMUSG00000066306
UniProt	Q14980; Q3SYK8	E9Q7G0
RefSeq (mRNA)	NM_001286561; NM_006185	NM_133947
RefSeq (protein)	NP_001273490; NP_006176; NP_006176.2	NP_598708; NP_001390473; NP_001390474; NP_001390475; NP_001390476 NP_001390477; NP_001390478; NP_001390479; NP_001390480; NP_001390481; NP_001390482
Location (UCSC)	Chr 11: 72 – 72.08 Mb	Chr 7: 101.58 – 101.66 Mb
PubMed search
- Wikidata
View/Edit Human	View/Edit Mouse

Nuclear mitotic apparatus protein 1 is a protein that in humans is encoded by the NUMA1 gene.

== Interactions ==
Nuclear mitotic apparatus protein 1 has been shown to interact with PIM1, Band 4.1, GPSM2 and EPB41L1.
