= SB269652 =

Dopamine receptor modulator

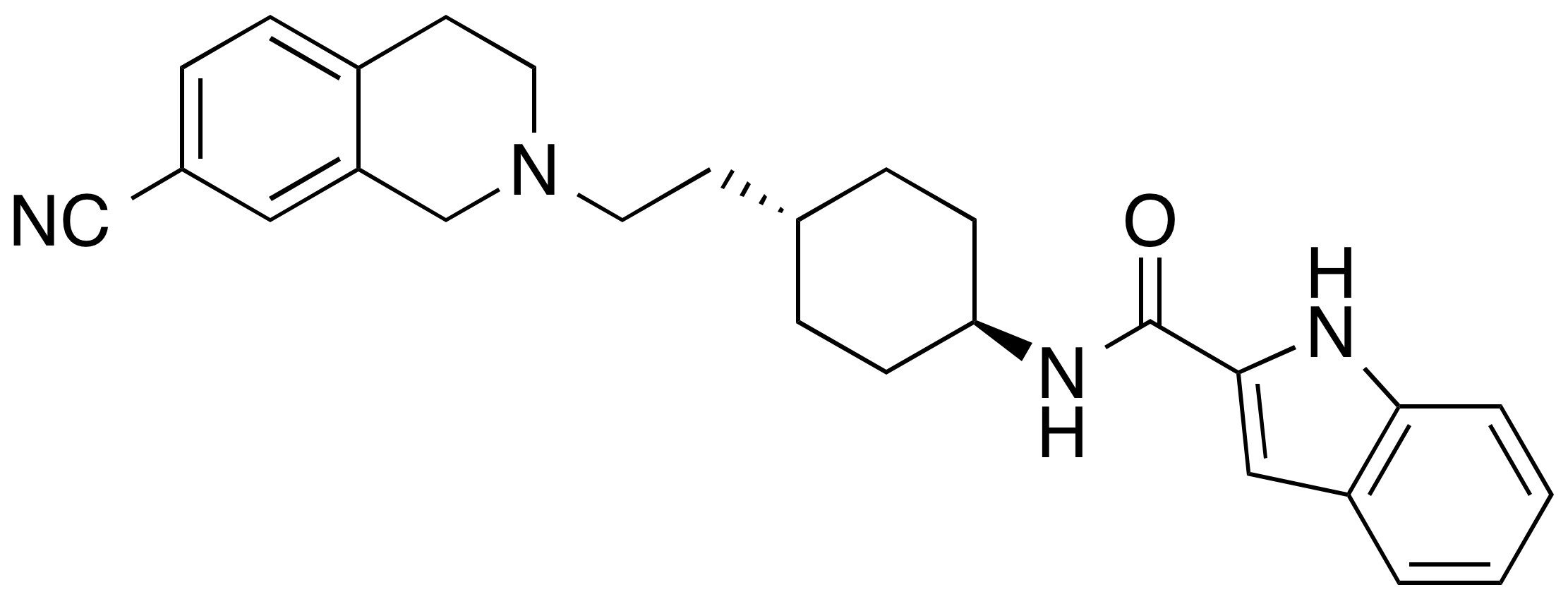

Clinical data
- Other names: SB-269652; SB-269,652
- Drug class: Dopamine D_{2} and D_{3} receptor negative allosteric modulator

Identifiers
- IUPAC name: N-[4-[2-(7-cyano-3,4-dihydro-1H-isoquinolin-2-yl)ethyl]cyclohexyl]-1H-indole-2-carboxamide
- CAS Number: 215802-15-6
- PubChem CID: 9910352
- IUPHAR/BPS: 7694
- ChemSpider: 26000574
- ChEMBL: ChEMBL2219578

Chemical and physical data
- Formula: C_{27}H_{30}N_{4}O
- Molar mass: 426.564 g·mol^{−1}
- 3D model (JSmol): Interactive image
- SMILES: C1CC(CCC1CCN2CCC3=C(C2)C=C(C=C3)C#N)NC(=O)C4=CC5=CC=CC=C5N4
- InChI: InChI=1S/C27H30N4O/c28-17-20-5-8-21-12-14-31(18-23(21)15-20)13-11-19-6-9-24(10-7-19)29-27(32)26-16-22-3-1-2-4-25(22)30-26/h1-5,8,15-16,19,24,30H,6-7,9-14,18H2,(H,29,32); Key:JGLGOAQPUQITLD-UHFFFAOYSA-N

SB269652 is an experimental dopamine D_{2} and D_{3} receptor negative allosteric modulator. It is of interest in the potential development of novel antipsychotics for treatment of schizophrenia with reduced side effects, such as extrapyramidal symptoms. The drug is described as a dual orthosteric and allosteric (i.e., bitopic) modulator of the dopamine D_{2} and D_{3} receptors, as an atypical allosteric modulator of these receptors, and as specifically targeting D_{2}–D_{3} receptor dimers. SB269652 was first described in the scientific literature by 1999. It was originally thought to act purely as an antagonist of the dopamine D_{2} and D_{3} receptors, but was serendipitously found to be a negative allosteric modulator of these receptors in 2010. It was the first dopamine D_{2} and D_{3} receptor negative allosteric modulator to be discovered. More potent analogues of SB269652 have been developed.
