= EPB41L1 =

Protein-coding gene in the species Homo sapiens

Identifiers
- Aliases: EPB41L1, 4.1N, MRD11, erythrocyte membrane protein band 4.1 like 1
- External IDs: OMIM: 602879; MGI: 103010; GeneCards: EPB41L1

Gene location (Human)
Chr.	Chromosome 20 (human)
Band	20q11.23	Start	36,091,504 bp
Band	20q11.23	End	36,232,799 bp

Gene location (Mouse)
Chr.	Chromosome 2 (mouse)
Band	2 H1|2 77.39 cM	Start	156,262,829 bp
Band	2 H1|2 77.39 cM	End	156,385,134 bp
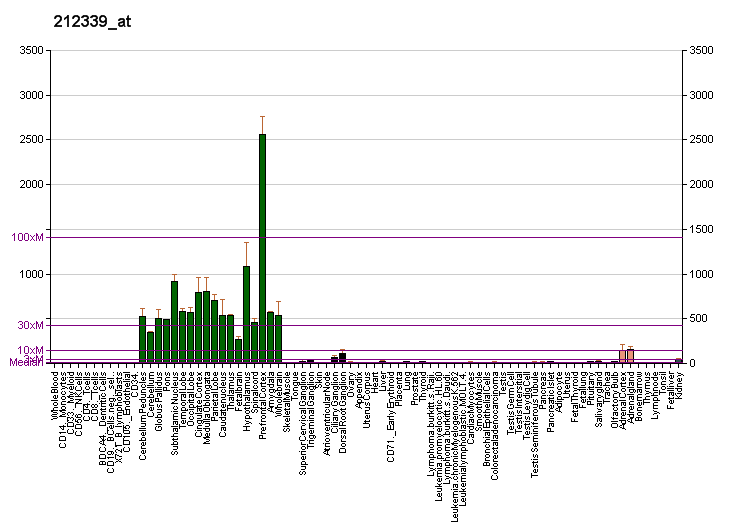

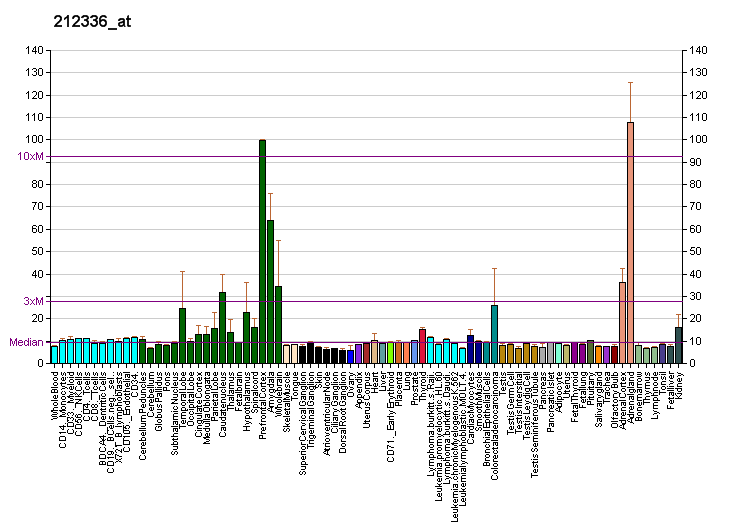
RNA expression pattern
Bgee	Human / Mouse (ortholog); Top expressed in: superior vestibular nucleus; pars compacta; pons; external globus pallidus; pars reticulata; parietal lobe; lateral nuclear group of thalamus; ventral tegmental area; postcentral gyrus; middle temporal gyrus / Top expressed in: visual cortex; primary visual cortex; superior frontal gyrus; cerebellar cortex; dentate gyrus of hippocampal formation granule cell; pontine nuclei; central gray substance of midbrain; olfactory tubercle; primary motor cortex; medial vestibular nucleus; More reference expression data
BioGPS	More reference expression data
Gene ontology
Molecular function	cytoskeletal protein binding; actin binding; protein binding; structural molecule activity; structural constituent of cytoskeleton
Cellular component	cytoplasm; cytosol; cytoskeleton; plasma membrane
Biological process	cortical actin cytoskeleton organization; actomyosin structure organization
Sources:Amigo / QuickGO
Orthologs
Databases	NCBI: entry; OMA: entry
Species	Human	Mouse
Entrez	2036	13821
Ensembl	ENSG00000088367	ENSMUSG00000027624
UniProt	Q9H4G0; Q4VXN0	Q9Z2H5
RefSeq (mRNA)	NM_001258329; NM_001258330; NM_001258331; NM_012156; NM_177996	NM_001003815; NM_001006664; NM_001291120; NM_001291121; NM_001291122 NM_001291123; NM_013510; NM_001368800; NM_001368801; NM_001368802; NM_001368803; NM_001368804
RefSeq (protein)	NP_001245258; NP_001245259; NP_001245260; NP_036288; NP_818932	NP_001006665; NP_001278049; NP_001278050; NP_001278051; NP_001278052 NP_038538; NP_001355729; NP_001355730; NP_001355731; NP_001355732; NP_001355733
Location (UCSC)	Chr 20: 36.09 – 36.23 Mb	Chr 2: 156.26 – 156.39 Mb
PubMed search
- Wikidata
View/Edit Human	View/Edit Mouse

Band 4.1-like protein 1 is a protein that in humans is encoded by the EPB41L1 gene.

== Function ==
Erythrocyte membrane protein band 4.1 (EPB41) is a multifunctional protein that mediates interactions between the erythrocyte cytoskeleton and the overlying plasma membrane. The protein encoded by this gene is a neuronally-enriched protein that is structurally similar to EPB41. The encoded protein binds and stabilizes D2 and D3 dopamine receptors at the neuronal plasma membrane. Multiple transcript variants encoding different isoforms have been found for this gene, but the full-length nature of only two of them has been determined.

== Interactions ==
EPB41L1 has been shown to interact with:

- CENTG1,
- Dopamine receptor D2,
- Dopamine receptor D3,
- ITPR1, and
- Nuclear mitotic apparatus protein 1.
