= Aplindore =

Chemical compound

Clinical data
- ATC code: none

Identifiers
- IUPAC name: (2S)-2-[(phenylmethylamino)methyl]-2,3,7,9-tetrahydro-[1,4]dioxino[3,2-e]indol-8-one
- CAS Number: 189681-70-7; fumarate: 189681-71-8
- PubChem CID: 6440763
- ChemSpider: 139676
- UNII: Q5O76TA0ML; fumarate: P13TV5A758
- KEGG: D03214
- ChEMBL: ChEMBL2110659
- CompTox Dashboard (EPA): DTXSID60870185

Chemical and physical data
- Formula: C_{18}H_{18}N_{2}O_{3}
- Molar mass: 310.353 g·mol^{−1}
- 3D model (JSmol): Interactive image
- SMILES: c4ccccc4CNCC(CO2)Oc1c2ccc(N3)c1CC3=O
- InChI: InChI=1S/C18H18N2O3/c21-17-8-14-15(20-17)6-7-16-18(14)23-13(11-22-16)10-19-9-12-4-2-1-3-5-12/h1-7,13,19H,8-11H2,(H,20,21)/t13-/m0/s1; Key:DYJIKHYBKVODAC-ZDUSSCGKSA-N

Aplindore (DAB-452) is a drug which acts as a partial agonist selective for the dopamine receptor D2. It is being developed by the pharmaceutical company Neurogen as a treatment for Parkinson's disease and restless legs syndrome.

On December 23, 2009 Neurogen was acquired by Ligand Pharmaceuticals. Rights to Aplindore were given to Ligand around time of merger. As of 2008, Phase II was completed and Ligand.

Upon reviewing company website (Ligand.com) this drug is currently not listed at the moment due to several programs already partnered with GSK. GSK holds a significant share of the drug RLS drug programs on the market with Requip XR and the recent FDA approval of Horizant. To prevent any direct competition and losing strong ties with GSK, Aplindore is not listed at the moment on Lidgand website. If this medication were to reach phase III, this could adversely effect Ligand`s portfolio of partnered and unpartnered assets. By electing not to list the drug on company website, Ligand maintains the appearance that they are "currently actively seeking a partner" when a potential investor inquirers about drug development via email.

== See also ==
- List of investigational antipsychotics
- List of investigational Parkinson's disease drugs
- List of investigational restless legs syndrome drugs
