= List of investigational restless legs syndrome drugs =

Investigational restless legs syndrome drugs

This is a list of investigational restless legs syndrome drugs, or drugs that are currently under development for clinical use for the treatment of restless legs syndrome (RLS) but are not yet approved.

Chemical/generic names are listed first, with developmental code names, synonyms, and brand names in parentheses. The format of list items is "Name (Synonyms) – Mechanism of Action [Reference]".

This list was last comprehensively updated in September 2025. It is likely to become outdated with time.

== Under development ==
=== Phase 3 ===
- Ferric carboxymaltose (Ferinject; Injectafer; Iron-dextri-maltose; Iroprem; Renegy; VIT-45; Z-213) – iron replacement

=== Phase 2 ===
- BP-14979 (BP-1.4979) – dopamine D_{3} receptor partial agonist
- Ropinirole transdermal (Haruropi Tape; HP-3000) – dopamine D_{2}-like receptor agonist

=== Preclinical ===
- ATH-399A (DWP-307399; HL-192) – nuclear receptor subfamily 4 group A member 2 (NR4A2) agonist

== Not under development ==
=== Suspended ===
- Aplindore (DAB-452; Palindore; SLS-006; WAY-DAB-452) – dopamine D_{2}-like receptor agonist

=== No development reported ===
- NLS-2 (NLS2) – iron replacement
- Research programme: cannabinoid-based therapeutics - Axim Biotechnologies (Cannabidiol/Gabapentin; Cannbleph) – various actions

=== Discontinued ===
- Entacapone (Comtan; Comtess; OR-611) – catechol O-methyltransferase (COMT) inhibitor
- IPX-159 – undefined mechanism of action
- Istradefylline (KW-6002; Nourianz; Nouriast) – adenosine A_{2A} receptor antagonist
- Pregabalin (CI-1008; isobutylgaba; Lyrica; PD-144723) – gabapentinoid (α_{2}δ subunit-containing voltage-gated calcium channel ligand)
- Radafaxine (GW-353162; (2S,3S)-hydroxybupropion) – norepinephrine–dopamine reuptake inhibitor (NDRI)
- Research programme: dopamine receptor agonists - DarPharma (DAR-0300) – dopamine receptor agonist
- Safinamide (EMD-1195686; Equfina; FCE-26743; ME-2125; NW-1015; Onstryv; PNU-151774; Xadago; ZP-034) – monoamine oxidase MAO-B inhibitor and other actions

== Clinically used drugs ==
=== Approved drugs ===
- Gabapentin enacarbil (ASP-8825; GSK-1838262; Horizant; Regnite; Solzira; XP-13512) – gabapentinoid (α_{2}δ subunit-containing voltage-gated calcium channel ligand)
- Oxycodone/naloxone (naloxone/oxycodone; Targin; Targinact; Targiniq) – combination of oxycodone (μ-opioid receptor agonist) and naloxone (orally inactive opioid receptor antagonist) (only in severe and treatment-refractory cases)
- Pramipexole (BI-Sifrol; Daquiran; Mirapex; Mirapexin; Pexola; Sifrol; SND-919) – dopamine D_{2}-like receptor agonist
- Ropinirole (Adartrel; Repreve; Requip; Ropinirole IR) – dopamine D_{2}-like receptor agonist
- Rotigotine transdermal (Leganto; N-0437; N-0923; Neupro; Nubrenza; SPM-962) – dopamine D_{2}-like receptor agonist

=== Off-label drugs ===
- Benzodiazepines (GABA_{A} receptor positive allosteric modulators) (e.g., clonazepam)
- Cannabinoids (cannabinoid receptor modulators) (e.g., cannabis, tetrahydrocannabinol (THC))
- Dopamine precursors (indirect dopamine receptor agonists) (e.g., carbidopa/levodopa)
- Dopamine D_{2}-like receptor agonists (e.g., cabergoline, pergolide)
- Gabapentinoids (α_{2}δ subunit-containing voltage-gated calcium channel ligands) (e.g., gabapentin, pregabalin)
- Iron supplements (e.g., ferrous sulfate)
- Opioids (μ-opioid receptor agonists) (e.g., tramadol, codeine, morphine, oxycodone, hydrocodone, methadone, buprenorphine) (only in severe and treatment-refractory cases)
- Others (e.g., amantadine, baclofen, bupropion, carbamazepine, clonidine, corticosteroids, dipyridamole, ketamine, lamotrigine, levetiracetam, orphenadrine, oxcarbazepine, perampanel, physostigmine, rasagiline, rifaximin, selegiline, topiramate, valproic acid)

== See also ==
- List of investigational drugs
- List of investigational Parkinson's disease drugs
