= Ryanodine receptor 1 =

Protein and coding gene in humans

RYR1
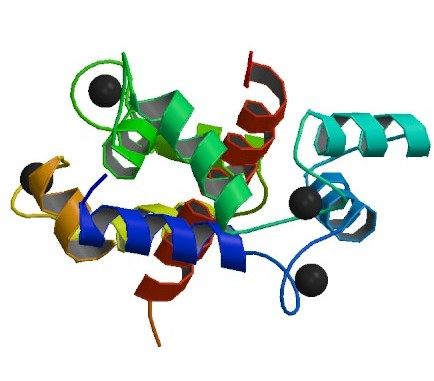

Identifiers
- Aliases: RYR1, CCO, MHS, MHS1, PPP1R137, RYDR, RYR, RYR-1, SKRR, ryanodine receptor 1, KDS
- External IDs: OMIM: 180901; MGI: 99659; GeneCards: RYR1

Gene location (Human)
Chr.	Chromosome 19 (human)
Band	19q13.2	Start	38,433,691 bp
Band	19q13.2	End	38,595,273 bp

Gene location (Mouse)
Chr.	Chromosome 7 (mouse)
Band	7 B1|7 16.94 cM	Start	29,003,344 bp
Band	7 B1|7 16.94 cM	End	29,125,179 bp
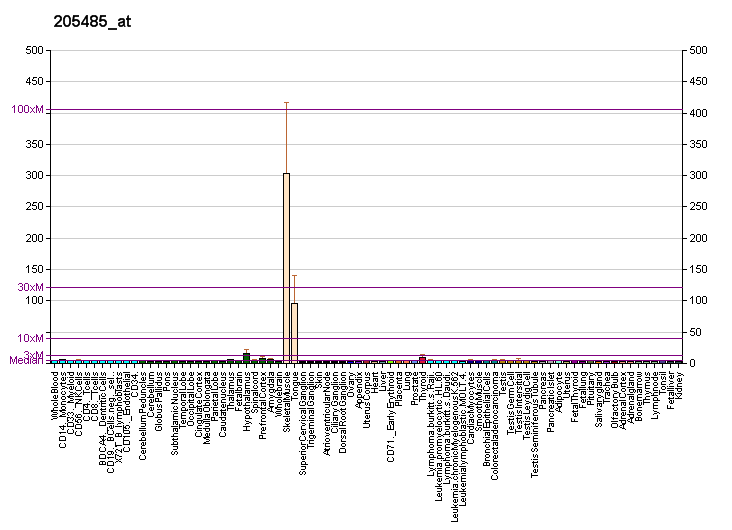
RNA expression pattern
Bgee	Human / Mouse (ortholog); Top expressed in: glutes; gastrocnemius muscle; muscle of thigh; triceps brachii muscle; vastus lateralis muscle; Skeletal muscle tissue of rectus abdominis; tibialis anterior muscle; Skeletal muscle tissue of biceps brachii; deltoid muscle; thoracic diaphragm / Top expressed in: triceps brachii muscle; vastus lateralis muscle; temporal muscle; gastrocnemius muscle; medial head of gastrocnemius muscle; extensor digitorum longus muscle; plantaris muscle; digastric muscle; sternocleidomastoid muscle; muscle of thigh; More reference expression data
BioGPS	More reference expression data
Gene ontology
Molecular function	voltage-gated calcium channel activity; calcium channel activity; calmodulin binding; protease binding; ion channel activity; protein binding; enzyme binding; calcium-release channel activity; ryanodine-sensitive calcium-release channel activity; calcium-induced calcium release activity; calcium ion binding; nucleotide binding; ATP binding; metal ion binding
Cellular component	cytoplasm; integral component of membrane; membrane; I band; T-tubule; plasma membrane; integral component of plasma membrane; sarcoplasmic reticulum; junctional sarcoplasmic reticulum membrane; terminal cisterna; smooth endoplasmic reticulum; cell cortex; junctional membrane complex; extracellular exosome; integral component of organelle membrane; ryanodine receptor complex; sarcoplasmic reticulum membrane; Z discdkac; cytoplasmic vesicle membrane; protein-containing complex; calcium channel complex; sarcolemma
Biological process	ossification involved in bone maturation; regulation of cardiac conduction; response to hypoxia; muscle contraction; release of sequestered calcium ion into cytosol by sarcoplasmic reticulum; regulation of cytosolic calcium ion concentration; outflow tract morphogenesis; cellular calcium ion homeostasis; ion transport; multicellular organism development; ion transmembrane transport; skeletal muscle fiber development; calcium ion transmembrane transport; response to caffeine; calcium ion transport; skin development; transmembrane transport; cellular response to caffeine; protein homotetramerization; cellular response to calcium ion; release of sequestered calcium ion into cytosol; transport
Sources:Amigo / QuickGO
Orthologs
Databases	NCBI: entry; OMA: entry
Species	Human	Mouse
Entrez	6261	20190
Ensembl	ENSG00000196218	ENSMUSG00000030592
UniProt	P21817	E9PZQ0
RefSeq (mRNA)	NM_000540; NM_001042723	NM_009109
RefSeq (protein)	NP_000531; NP_001036188	NP_033135
Location (UCSC)	Chr 19: 38.43 – 38.6 Mb	Chr 7: 29 – 29.13 Mb
PubMed search
- Wikidata
View/Edit Human	View/Edit Mouse

Ryanodine receptor 1 (RYR-1) also known as skeletal muscle calcium release channel or skeletal muscle-type ryanodine receptor is one of a class of ryanodine receptors and a protein found primarily in skeletal muscle. In humans, it is encoded by the RYR1 gene.

== Function ==
RYR1 functions as a calcium release channel in the sarcoplasmic reticulum, as well as a connection between the sarcoplasmic reticulum and the transverse tubule. RYR1 is associated with the dihydropyridine receptor (L-type calcium channels) within the sarcolemma of the T-tubule, which opens in response to depolarization, and thus effectively means that the RYR1 channel opens in response to depolarization of the cell.

RYR1 plays a signaling role during embryonic skeletal myogenesis. A correlation exists between RYR1-mediated Ca2+ signaling and the expression of multiple molecules involved in key myogenic signaling pathways. Of these, more than 10 differentially expressed genes belong to the Wnt family which are essential for differentiation. This coincides with the observation that without RYR1 present, muscle cells appear in smaller groups, are underdeveloped, and lack organization. Fiber type composition is also affected, with less type 1 muscle fibers when there are decreased amounts of RYR1. These findings demonstrate RYR1 has a non-contractile role during muscle development.

RYR1 is mechanically linked to neuromuscular junctions for the calcium release-calcium induced biological process. While nerve-derived signals are required for acetylcholine receptor cluster distribution, there is evidence to suggest RYR1 activity is an important mediator in the formation and patterning of these receptors during embryological development. The signals from the nerve and RYR1 activity appear to counterbalance each other. When RYR1 is eliminated, the acetylcholine receptor clusters appear in an abnormally narrow pattern, yet without signals from the nerve, the clusters are scattered and broad. Although their direct role is still unknown, RYR1 is required for proper distribution of acetylcholine receptor clusters.

== Clinical significance ==
Mutations in the RYR1 gene are associated with malignant hyperthermia susceptibility, central core disease, minicore myopathy with external ophthalmoplegia and samaritan myopathy, a benign congenital myopathy. Alternatively spliced transcripts encoding different isoforms have been demonstrated. Dantrolene may be the only known drug that is effective during cases of malignant hyperthermia.

== Interactions ==
RYR1 has been shown to interact with:

- calmodulin
- FKBP1A
- HOMER1
- HOMER2
- HOMER3 and
- TRDN.

== See also ==
- Ryanodine receptor
