= AGAP2 =

Protein-coding gene in the species Homo sapiens

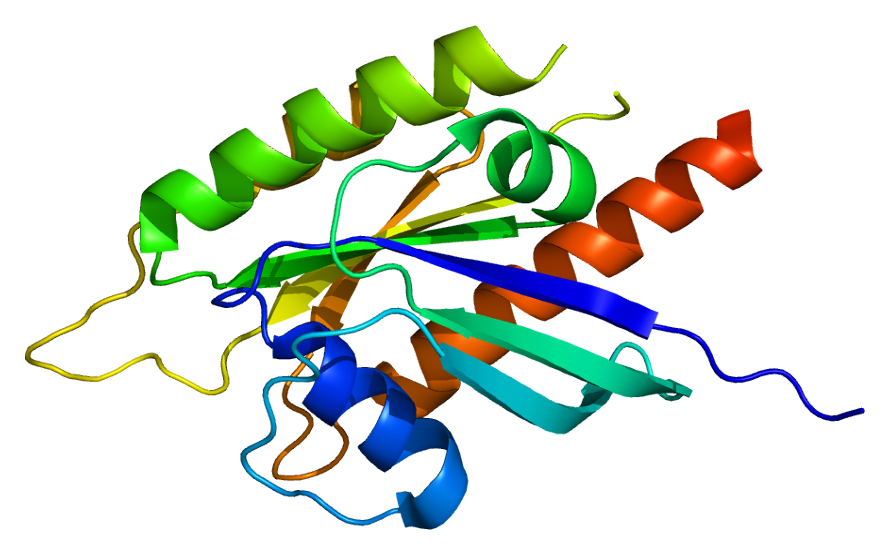

Identifiers
- Aliases: AGAP2, CENTG1, GGAP2, PIKE, ArfGAP with GTPase domain, ankyrin repeat and PH domain 2
- External IDs: OMIM: 605476; MGI: 3580016; GeneCards: AGAP2
Available structures
PDB	Ortholog search: PDBe RCSB
PDB	List of PDB id codes 2BMJ, 2IWR, 2RLO

Gene location (Human)
Chr.	Chromosome 12 (human)
Band	12q14.1	Start	57,723,761 bp
Band	12q14.1	End	57,742,157 bp

Gene location (Mouse)
Chr.	Chromosome 10 (mouse)
Band	10|10 D3	Start	126,911,153 bp
Band	10|10 D3	End	126,929,038 bp
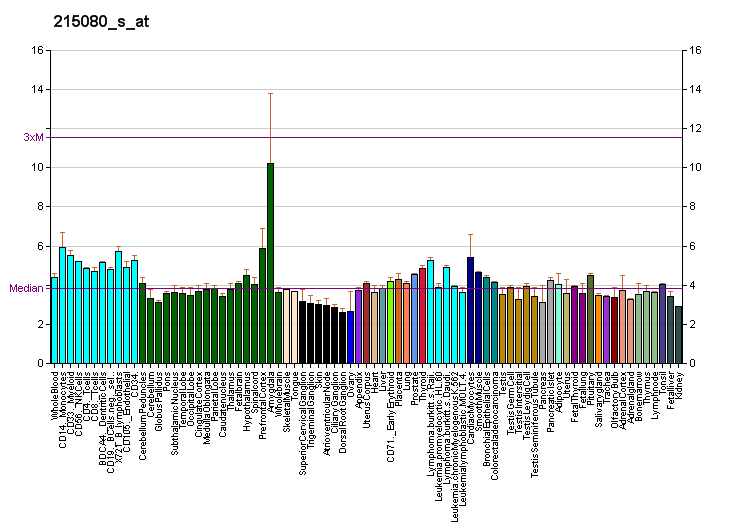

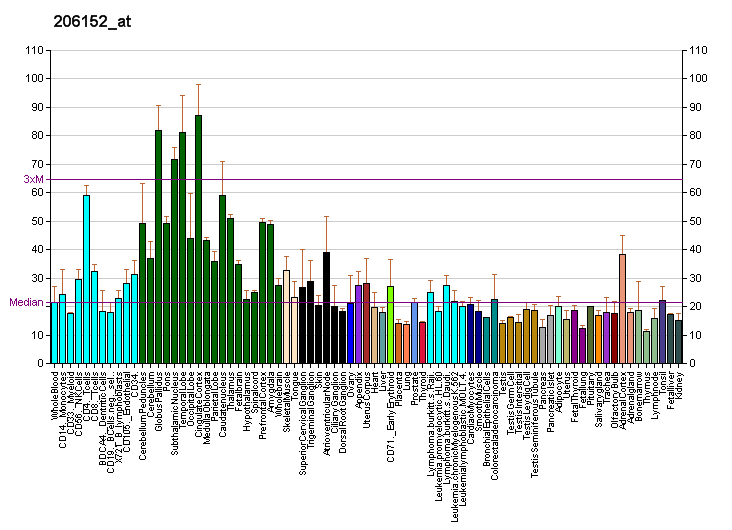
RNA expression pattern
Bgee	Human / Mouse (ortholog); Top expressed in: right hemisphere of cerebellum; right frontal lobe; cingulate gyrus; anterior cingulate cortex; nucleus accumbens; amygdala; prefrontal cortex; caudate nucleus; Brodmann area 9; putamen / Top expressed in: striatum of neuraxis; superior frontal gyrus; primary visual cortex; hippocampus proper; olfactory bulb; dentate gyrus of hippocampal formation granule cell; cerebellar cortex; hypothalamus; granulocyte; thymus; More reference expression data
BioGPS	More reference expression data
Gene ontology
Molecular function	GTPase activator activity; metal ion binding; nucleotide binding; GTP binding; protein binding; GTPase activity
Cellular component	extracellular exosome; membrane; nucleolus; cytoplasm; mitochondrion; nucleus
Biological process	negative regulation of neuron apoptotic process; protein transport; negative regulation of protein catabolic process; positive regulation of GTPase activity; transport; positive regulation of 1-phosphatidylinositol-3-kinase activity
Sources:Amigo / QuickGO
Orthologs
Databases	NCBI: entry; OMA: entry
Species	Human	Mouse
Entrez	116986	216439
Ensembl	ENSG00000135439	ENSMUSG00000025422
UniProt	Q99490	Q3UHD9
RefSeq (mRNA)	NM_001122772; NM_014770	NM_001033263; NM_001301014
RefSeq (protein)	NP_001116244; NP_055585	NP_001028435; NP_001287943
Location (UCSC)	Chr 12: 57.72 – 57.74 Mb	Chr 10: 126.91 – 126.93 Mb
PubMed search
- Wikidata
View/Edit Human	View/Edit Mouse

Arf-GAP with GTPase, ANK repeat and PH domain-containing protein 2 is a protein that in humans is encoded by the AGAP2 gene.

== Interactions ==
CENTG1 has been shown to interact with:

- EPB41L1,
- HOMER1 and
- PIK3R1.
