= SB-277,011-A =

Chemical compound

Identifiers
- IUPAC name: N-{trans-4-[2-(6-cyano-3,4-dihydroisoquinolin-2(1H)-yl)ethyl]cyclohexyl}quinoline-4-carboxamide
- CAS Number: 215803-78-4
- PubChem CID: 5311096
- IUPHAR/BPS: 143
- ChemSpider: 4470626
- UNII: CHW57ND47C
- ChEMBL: ChEMBL85606
- CompTox Dashboard (EPA): DTXSID10944188

Chemical and physical data
- Formula: C_{28}H_{30}N_{4}O
- Molar mass: 438.575 g·mol^{−1}
- 3D model (JSmol): Interactive image
- SMILES: c4cccc1c4nccc1C(=O)NC3CCC(CC3)CCN(CCc2c5)Cc2ccc5C#N
- InChI: InChI=1S/C28H30N4O/c29-18-21-5-8-23-19-32(16-13-22(23)17-21)15-12-20-6-9-24(10-7-20)31-28(33)26-11-14-30-27-4-2-1-3-25(26)27/h1-5,8,11,14,17,20,24H,6-7,9-10,12-13,15-16,19H2,(H,31,33); Key:OLWRVVHPJFLNPW-UHFFFAOYSA-N

SB-277,011A is a drug which acts as a potent and selective dopamine D_{3} receptor antagonist, which is around 80–100 times selective for D_{3} over D_{2}, and lacks any partial agonist activity.

SB-277,011A is used in the study of addiction to stimulant drugs such as nicotine and cocaine. Where cocaine reduces the threshold for brain electrical self-stimulation in rats, an indication of cocaine's rewarding effects, SB-277,011A completely reverses this effect. It may thus be useful in the treatment of addiction to nicotine and cocaine, and is also being investigated for potential uses in the treatment of other drug addictions, such as addiction to heroin and alcohol.

Another potential application for SB-277,011A is in the treatment of schizophrenia, and it may be particularly useful in treating comorbid patients who are both schizophrenic and addicted to drugs. However it may worsen side effects such as tardive dyskinesia in patients who are already prescribed antipsychotic drugs.

== See also ==
- GSK-598809
- Nafadotride
- PNU-99,194
