= ST-148 (D2L antagonist) =

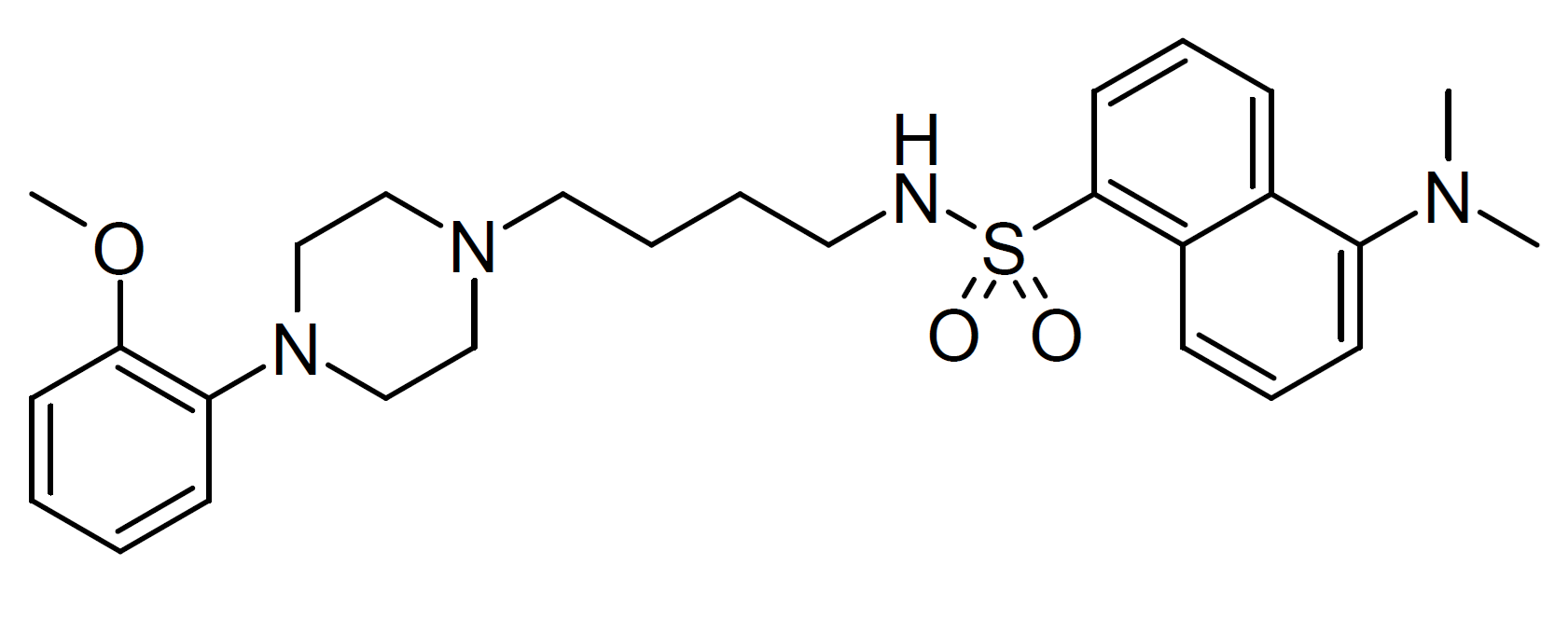

Identifiers
- IUPAC name: 5-(Dimethylamino)-N-(4-(4-(2-methoxyphenyl)piperazin-1-yl)butyl)naphthalene-1-sulfonamide
- CAS Number: 390803-39-1
- PubChem CID: 6604000
- ChemSpider: 5036306
- ChEMBL: ChEMBL575768

Chemical and physical data
- Formula: C_{27}H_{36}N_{4}O_{3}S
- Molar mass: 496.67 g·mol^{−1}
- 3D model (JSmol): Interactive image
- SMILES: CN(C)C1=CC=CC2=C1C=CC=C2S(=O)(=O)NCCCCN3CCN(CC3)C4=CC=CC=C4OC
- InChI: InChI=1S/C27H36N4O3S/c1-29(2)24-13-8-11-23-22(24)10-9-15-27(23)35(32,33)28-16-6-7-17-30-18-20-31(21-19-30)25-12-4-5-14-26(25)34-3/h4-5,8-15,28H,6-7,16-21H2,1-3H3; Key:GZQHTWYWDSMEAW-UHFFFAOYSA-N

ST-148 is a drug which acts as a subtype selective antagonist for dopamine receptors, with reasonable selectivity for the D2L subtype.

== See also ==
- Aripiprazole
- WAY-100635
