= ST-148 (antiviral) =

Identifiers
- IUPAC name: 3-Amino-N-(5-phenyl-1,3,4-thiadiazol-2-yl)-6,7,8,9-tetrahydro-5H-cyclohepta[b]thieno[3,2-e]pyridine-2-carboxamide
- CAS Number: 400863-77-6
- PubChem CID: 2909914
- ChemSpider: 2183647
- ChEMBL: ChEMBL4516506

Chemical and physical data
- Formula: C_{21}H_{19}N_{5}OS_{2}
- Molar mass: 421.54 g·mol^{−1}
- 3D model (JSmol): Interactive image
- SMILES: C1CCC2=CC3=C(N=C2CC1)SC(=C3N)C(=O)NC4=NN=C(S4)C5=CC=CC=C5
- InChI: InChI=1S/C21H19N5OS2/c22-16-14-11-13-9-5-2-6-10-15(13)23-20(14)28-17(16)18(27)24-21-26-25-19(29-21)12-7-3-1-4-8-12/h1,3-4,7-8,11H,2,5-6,9-10,22H2,(H,24,26,27); Key:FGRXYHXHXBKKAK-UHFFFAOYSA-N

ST-148 is an antiviral drug which acts as a capsid inhibitor. It was developed for treatment of dengue fever, but while it shows strongest activity against dengue virus it also shows broad spectrum activity against other flaviviruses such as Zika virus. It is thought to cause viral capsid proteins to become more rigid, inhibiting both assembly and disassembly of capsids and thereby hindering viral replication and infection of cells.
