= CGP-25454A =

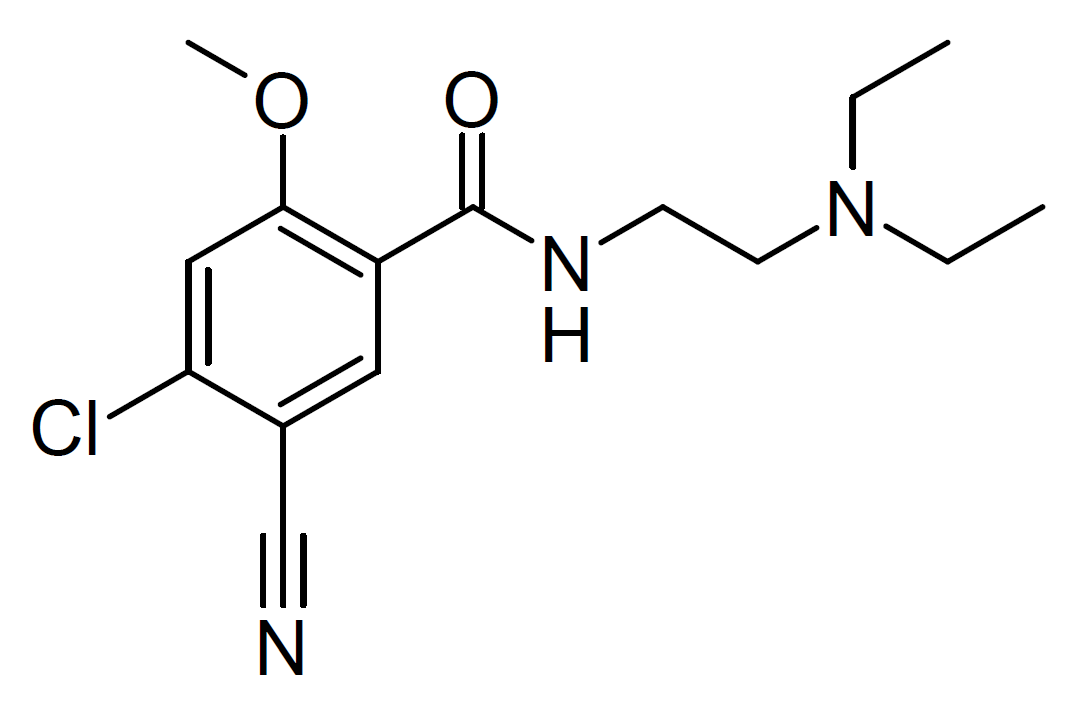

Identifiers
- IUPAC name: 4-chloro-5-cyano-N-[2-(diethylamino)ethyl]-2-methoxybenzamide
- CAS Number: 104391-26-6
- PubChem CID: 9819591
- ChemSpider: 7995340

Chemical and physical data
- Formula: C_{15}H_{20}ClN_{3}O_{2}
- Molar mass: 309.79 g·mol^{−1}
- 3D model (JSmol): Interactive image
- SMILES: CCN(CC)CCNC(=O)C1=C(C=C(C(=C1)C#N)Cl)OC
- InChI: InChI=1S/C15H20ClN3O2/c1-4-19(5-2)7-6-18-15(20)12-8-11(10-17)13(16)9-14(12)21-3/h8-9H,4-7H2,1-3H3,(H,18,20); Key:JEMKCYHUYUPGFN-UHFFFAOYSA-N

CGP-25454A is a drug which acts as an antagonist at presynaptic D_{2}Sh autoreceptors on dopaminergic nerve terminals, producing stimulant effects at low doses in animal studies due to increased dopamine release, but sedative effects at higher doses due to loss of selectivity and antagonism of postsynaptic D_{2} receptors as well.

== See also ==
- Amisulpride
- UH-232
