= Dopamine receptor D2 =

Main receptor for most antipsychotic drugs

DRD2
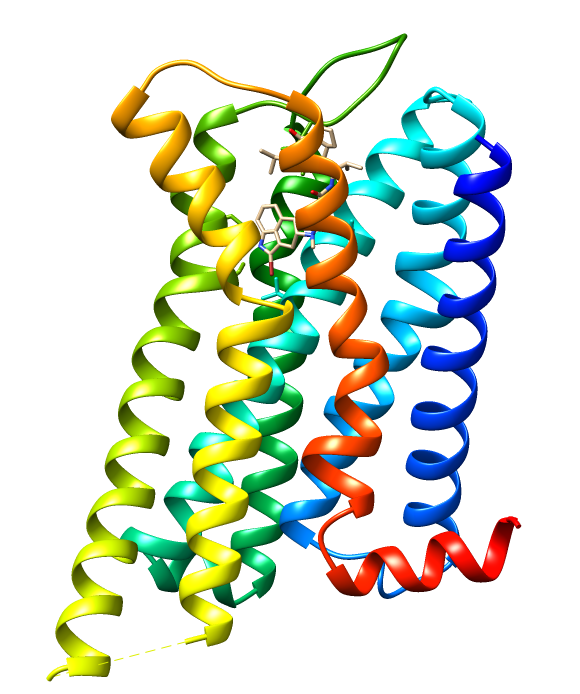

Identifiers
- Aliases: DRD2, D2DR, D2R, dopamine receptor D2
- External IDs: OMIM: 126450; MGI: 94924; GeneCards: DRD2
Available structures
PDB	Ortholog search: PDBe RCSB
PDB	List of PDB id codes 6CM4

Gene location (Human)
Chr.	Chromosome 11 (human)
Band	11q23.2	Start	113,409,605 bp
Band	11q23.2	End	113,475,691 bp

Gene location (Mouse)
Chr.	Chromosome 9 (mouse)
Band	9 A5.3|9 26.72 cM	Start	49,251,927 bp
Band	9 A5.3|9 26.72 cM	End	49,319,477 bp
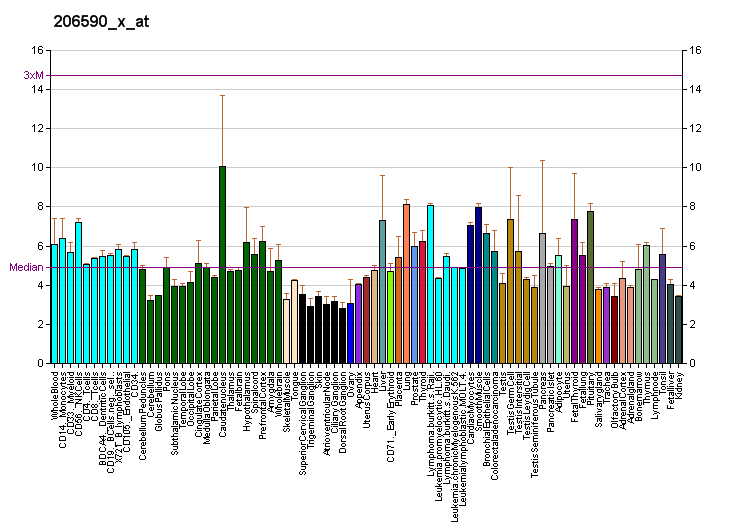

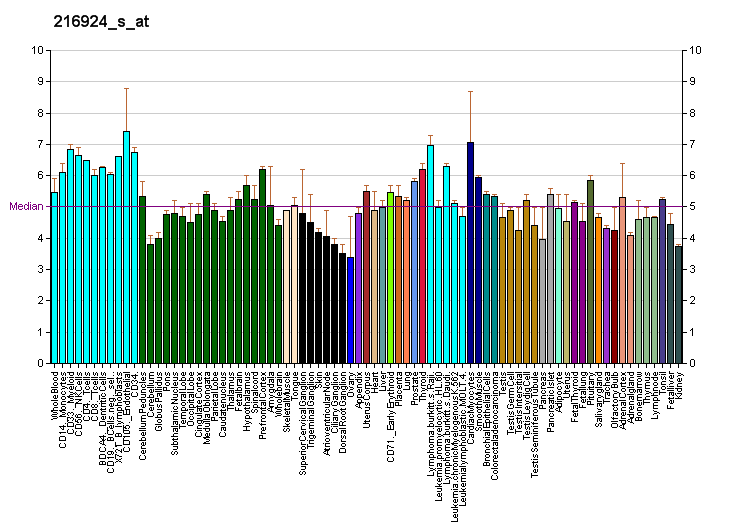

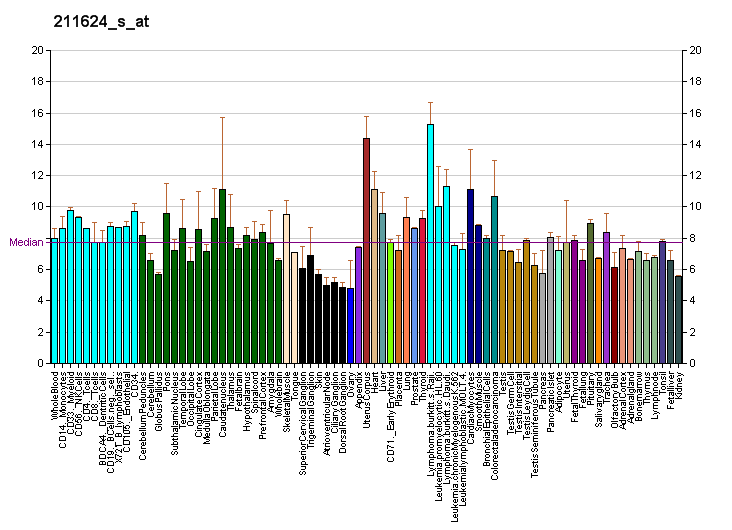
RNA expression pattern
Bgee	Human / Mouse (ortholog); Top expressed in: putamen; nucleus accumbens; testicle; pituitary gland; caudate nucleus; anterior pituitary; triceps brachii muscle; pars compacta; pars reticulata; ventral tegmental area / Top expressed in: superior frontal gyrus; striatum of neuraxis; dorsal striatum; nucleus accumbens; olfactory epithelium; lumbar subsegment of spinal cord; neural layer of retina; olfactory tubercle; embryo; ankle joint; More reference expression data
BioGPS	More reference expression data
Gene ontology
Molecular function	protein homodimerization activity; potassium channel regulator activity; dopamine neurotransmitter receptor activity, coupled via Gi/Go; identical protein binding; dopamine neurotransmitter receptor activity; G protein-coupled receptor activity; protein binding; signal transducer activity; adrenergic receptor activity; dopamine binding; signaling receptor binding; ionotropic glutamate receptor binding; protein heterodimerization activity
Cellular component	cytoplasmic vesicle; sperm flagellum; endocytic vesicle; acrosomal vesicle; dendritic spine; synaptic vesicle membrane; perikaryon; plasma membrane; dendrite; ciliary membrane; axon terminus; integral component of membrane; postsynaptic density; membrane; lateral plasma membrane; axon; intracellular anatomical structure; non-motile cilium; integral component of plasma membrane; dopaminergic synapse; glutamatergic synapse; GABA-ergic synapse; integral component of postsynaptic membrane; integral component of presynaptic membrane
Biological process	negative regulation of cell population proliferation; temperature homeostasis; adenylate cyclase-inhibiting dopamine receptor signaling pathway; adenohypophysis development; circadian regulation of gene expression; response to toxic substance; regulation of dopamine secretion; response to cocaine; response to amphetamine; sensory perception of smell; locomotory behavior; positive regulation of urine volume; response to ethanol; axonogenesis; response to inactivity; phospholipase C-activating dopamine receptor signaling pathway; modulation of chemical synaptic transmission; grooming behavior; negative regulation of protein kinase B signaling; associative learning; positive regulation of cytosolic calcium ion concentration involved in phospholipase C-activating G protein-coupled signaling pathway; regulation of dopamine uptake involved in synaptic transmission; regulation of synaptic transmission, GABAergic; positive regulation of dopamine uptake involved in synaptic transmission; signal transduction; Wnt signaling pathway; adult walking behavior; branching morphogenesis of a nerve; negative regulation of cytosolic calcium ion concentration; negative regulation of innate immune response; regulation of phosphoprotein phosphatase activity; acid secretion; feeding behavior; positive regulation of G protein-coupled receptor signaling pathway; response to axon injury; striatum development; synaptic transmission, dopaminergic; nervous system process involved in regulation of systemic arterial blood pressure; peristalsis; regulation of long-term neuronal synaptic plasticity; activation of protein kinase activity; positive regulation of growth hormone secretion; regulation of sodium ion transport; forebrain development; response to light stimulus; orbitofrontal cortex development; prepulse inhibition; response to morphine; response to iron ion; positive regulation of ERK1 and ERK2 cascade; long-term memory; positive regulation of renal sodium excretion; negative regulation of insulin secretion; neuron-neuron synaptic transmission; intracellular signal transduction; auditory behavior; behavioral response to ethanol; regulation of heart rate; adenylate cyclase-activating adrenergic receptor signaling pathway; positive regulation of cytokinesis; regulation of potassium ion transport; pigmentation; cellular calcium ion homeostasis; dopamine metabolic process; response to nicotine; regulation of MAPK cascade; response to histamine; negative regulation of synaptic transmission, glutamatergic; response to hypoxia; negative regulation of circadian sleep/wake cycle, sleep; negative regulation of protein secretion; synapse assembly; regulation of locomotion involved in locomotory behavior; dopamine receptor signaling pathway; negative regulation of dopamine receptor signaling pathway; startle response; positive regulation of receptor internalization; protein localization; arachidonic acid secretion; positive regulation of transcription by RNA polymerase II; G protein-coupled receptor internalization; positive regulation of multicellular organism growth; positive regulation of long-term synaptic potentiation; negative regulation of dopamine secretion; adult behavior; cerebral cortex GABAergic interneuron migration; regulation of synapse structural plasticity; adenylate cyclase-modulating G protein-coupled receptor signaling pathway; visual learning; negative regulation of cell migration; behavioral response to cocaine; positive regulation of neuroblast proliferation; negative regulation of blood pressure; release of sequestered calcium ion into cytosol; negative regulation of voltage-gated calcium channel activity; G protein-coupled receptor signaling pathway; negative regulation of adenylate cyclase activity; excitatory postsynaptic potential; negative regulation of protein phosphorylation; autophagy; positive regulation of neurogenesis; negative regulation of cell death; drinking behavior; adrenergic receptor signaling pathway; regulation of neurotransmitter uptake; postsynaptic modulation of chemical synaptic transmission; regulation of synaptic vesicle exocytosis
Sources:Amigo / QuickGO
Orthologs
Databases	NCBI: entry; OMA: entry
Species	Human	Mouse
Entrez	1813	13489
Ensembl	ENSG00000149295	ENSMUSG00000032259
UniProt	P14416	P61168
RefSeq (mRNA)	NM_016574; NM_000795	NM_010077
RefSeq (protein)	NP_000786; NP_057658; NP_000786.1	NP_034207
Location (UCSC)	Chr 11: 113.41 – 113.48 Mb	Chr 9: 49.25 – 49.32 Mb
PubMed search
- Wikidata
View/Edit Human	View/Edit Mouse

Dopamine receptor D_{2}, also known as D_{2}R, is a protein that, in humans, is encoded by the DRD2 gene. After work from Paul Greengard's lab had suggested that dopamine receptors were the site of action of antipsychotic drugs, several groups, including those of Solomon H. Snyder and Philip Seeman used a radiolabeled antipsychotic drug to identify what is now known as the dopamine D_{2} receptor. The dopamine D_{2} receptor is the main receptor for most antipsychotic drugs. The structure of DRD2 in complex with the atypical antipsychotic risperidone has been determined.

== Function ==
D_{2} receptors are coupled to the G_{i} subtype of G protein. This G protein-coupled receptor inhibits adenylyl cyclase activity.

In mice, regulation of D_{2}R surface expression by the neuronal calcium sensor-1 (NCS-1) in the dentate gyrus is involved in exploration, synaptic plasticity and memory formation. Studies have shown potential roles for D_{2}R in retrieval of fear memories in the prelimbic cortex and in discrimination learning in the nucleus accumbens.

In flies, activation of the D_{2} autoreceptor protected dopamine neurons from cell death induced by MPP^{+}, a toxin mimicking Parkinson's disease pathology.

While optimal dopamine levels favor D_{1}R cognitive stabilization, it is the D_{2}R that mediates the cognitive flexibility in humans.

Dopamine D2 receptors have also been investigated for their involvement in reward processing and decision-making. In a 2023 study involving macaques, stimulation of D2-family receptors increased the activity of prefrontal neurons that represented expected reward size during a working memory task. A 2024 human study examined a DRD2 genetic variant associated with reduced D2 receptor expression and found that carriers made less effective decisions in a reward-based task than noncarriers. However, the study did not find the predicted relationship between this genetic variation and the brain's response to rewards. These findings suggest that D2 receptor signaling may contribute to reward-related learning and decision-making, although the relationship is complex and further research is needed.

Recent research has further examined the role of dopamine D2 receptors in reward processing and motivation. Banuelos et al. (2024) investigated the relationship between D2 receptor expression, reward-related brain activity, and reinforcement learning during a value-based decision-making task. Their findings provided evidence of an association between D2 receptor expression and individual differences in decision-making and reward-related behavior.

Osugo et al. (2025) examined the effects of D2/D3 receptor signaling on human reward processing. Their study found that sustained D2/D3 receptor antagonism was associated with reduced striatal responses to reward stimuli and changes in motivation and pleasure. These findings suggest that D2/D3 receptor signaling contributes to reward processing and motivated behavior, although the individual contributions of D2 and D3 receptors cannot be separated by this study.

== Isoforms ==
Alternative splicing of this gene results in three transcript variants encoding different isoforms.

The long form (D2Lh) has the "canonical" sequence and functions as a classic post-synaptic receptor. The short form (D2Sh) is pre-synaptic and functions as an autoreceptor that regulates the levels of dopamine in the synaptic cleft. Agonism of D2sh receptors inhibits dopamine release; antagonism increases dopaminergic release. A third D2(Longer) form differs from the canonical sequence where 270V is replaced by VVQ.

== Active and inactive forms ==
D_{2}R conformers are equilibrated between two full active (D_{2}^{High}R) and inactive (D_{2}^{Low}R) states, while in complex with an agonist and antagonist ligand, respectively.

The monomeric inactive conformer of D_{2}R in binding with risperidone was reported in 2018 (PDB ID: 6CM4). However, the active form which is generally bound to an agonist, is not available yet and in most of the studies the homology modeling of the structure is implemented. The difference between the active and inactive of G protein-coupled receptor is mainly observed as conformational changes at the cytoplasmic half of the structure, particularly at the transmembrane domains (TM) 5 and 6. The conformational transitions occurred at the cytoplasmic ends are due to the coupling of G protein to the cytoplasmic loop between the TM 5 and 6.

It was observed that either D_{2}R agonist or antagonist ligands revealed better binding affinities inside the ligand-binding domain of the active D_{2}R in comparison with the inactive state. It demonstrated that ligand-binding domain of D_{2}R is affected by the conformational changes occurring at the cytoplasmic domains of the TM 5 and 6. In consequence, the D_{2}R activation reflects a positive cooperation on the ligand-binding domain.

In drug discovery studies in order to calculate the binding affinities of the D_{2}R ligands inside the binding domain, it's important to work on which form of D_{2}R. It's known that the full active and inactive states are recommended to be used for the agonist and antagonist studies, respectively.

Any disordering in equilibration of D_{2}R states, which causes problems in signal transferring between the nervous systems, may lead to diverse serious disorders, such as schizophrenia, autism and Parkinson's disease. In order to assist in the management of these conditions, equilibration between the D_{2}R states is controlled by implementing of agonist and antagonist D_{2}R ligands. In most cases, it was observed that the problems regarding the D_{2}R states may have genetic roots and are controlled by drug therapies. So far, there is no certain treatment for these mental disorders.

== Allosteric pocket and orthosteric pocket ==
There is an orthosteric binding site (OBS), as well as a secondary binding pocket (SBP) on the dopamine 2 receptor, and interaction with the SBP is a requirement for allosteric pharmacology. The compound SB269652 is a negative allosteric modulator of the D_{2}R.

== Oligomerization of D_{2}R ==
It was observed that D_{2}R exists in dimeric forms or higher order oligomers. There are some experimental and molecular modeling evidences that demonstrated the D_{2}R monomers cross link from their TM 4 and TM 5 to form dimeric conformers.

== Genetics ==
Allelic variants:

- A-241G
- C132T, G423A, T765C, C939T, C957T, and G1101A
- Cys311Ser
- -141C insertion/deletion The polymorphisms have been investigated with respect to association with schizophrenia.

Some researchers have previously associated the polymorphism Taq 1A (rs1800497) to the DRD2 gene. However, the polymorphism resides in exon 8 of the ANKK1 gene. DRD2 TaqIA polymorphism has been reported to be associated with an increased risk for developing motor fluctuations but not hallucinations in Parkinson's disease. A splice variant in Dopamine receptor D2(rs1076560) was found to be associated with limb truncal tardive dyskinesia and diminished expression factor of Positive and Negative Syndrome Scale (PANSS) in schizophrenia subjects.

== Ligands ==
Most of the older antipsychotic drugs such as chlorpromazine and haloperidol are antagonists for the dopamine D_{2} receptor, but are, in general, very unselective, at best selective only for the "D_{2}-like family" receptors and so binding to D_{2}, D_{3} and D_{4}, and often also to many other receptors such as those for serotonin and histamine, resulting in a range of side-effects and making them poor agents for scientific research. In similar manner, older dopamine agonists used for Parkinson's disease such as bromocriptine and cabergoline are poorly selective for one dopamine receptor over another, and, although most of these agents do act as D_{2} agonists, they affect other subtypes as well. Several selective D_{2} ligands are, however, now available, and this number is likely to increase as further research progresses.

=== Agonists ===
- Bromocriptine – full agonist
- Cabergoline (Dostinex)
- N,N-Propyldihydrexidine – analogue of the D_{1}/D_{5} agonist dihydrexidine; Selective for postsynaptic D_{2} receptor over the presynaptic D_{2} autoreceptor.
- Piribedil – also D_{3} receptor agonist and α_{2}–adrenergic antagonist
- Pramipexole – also D_{3}, D_{4} receptor agonist
- Quinagolide (Norprolac)
- Quinelorane – affinity for D_{2} > D_{3}
- Quinpirole – also D_{3} receptor agonist
- Ropinirole – full agonist
- Sumanirole – full agonist; highly selective
- Talipexole – selective for D_{2} over other dopamine receptors, but also acts as α_{2}–adrenoceptor agonist and 5-HT_{3} antagonist.

=== Partial agonists ===
- Aplindore
- Aripiprazole
- Armodafinil – although primarily thought to be a weak DAT inhibitor, armodafinil is also a D_{2} partial agonist.
- Modafinil - The (R)-(−)-enantiomer, known as Armodafinil in its pure form
- Brexpiprazole
- Cariprazine
- Cannabidiol
- GSK-789,472 – Also D_{3} antagonist, with good selectivity over other receptors
- Ketamine (also NMDA antagonist)
- LSD – in vitro, LSD was found to be a partial agonist and potentiates dopamine-mediated prolactin secretion in lactotrophs. LSD is also a 5-HT_{2A} agonist.
- OSU-6162 – also 5-HT_{2A} partial agonist, acts as "dopamine stabilizer"
- Roxindole (only at the D_{2} autoreceptors)
- Brilaroxazine(RP5063)
- Salvinorin A – also κ-opioid agonist.
- Memantine – Also NMDA antagonist

=== Antagonists ===
- Atypical antipsychotics (except aripiprazole, brexpiprazole, and any other D_{2} receptor partial agonists)
- Cinnarizine
- Chloroethylnorapomorphine
- Desmethoxyfallypride
- Domperidone – D_{2} and D_{3} antagonist; does not cross the blood-brain barrier
- Mesdopetam
- Metoclopramide – Antiemetic, crosses blood-brain barrier. Causes drug-induced Parkinsonism.
- Eticlopride
- Fallypride
- Hydroxyzine (Vistaril, Atarax)
- Itopride - does not cross the blood-brain barrier
- L-741,626 – 4-phenylpiperidine (similar to haloperidol), highly selective D_{2} inverse agonist
- ST-148 (D2L antagonist) - D2L selective antagonist
- ^{11}C-radiolabeled Raclopride – commonly employed in positron emission tomography studies
- Typical antipsychotics
- SV 293
- Yohimbine
- Buspirone – D_{2} presynaptic autoreceptors (low dose) and postsynaptic D_{2} receptors (at higher doses) antagonist

D_{2}sh selective (presynaptic autoreceptors)

- Amisulpride (low doses)
- CGP-25454A
- Sulpiride
- UH-232

=== Allosteric modulators ===
- Homocysteine – negative allosteric modulator
- PAOPA
- SB269652

=== Heterobivalent ligands ===
- 1-(6-(((R,S)-7-Hydroxychroman-2-yl)methylamino]hexyl)-3-((S)-1-methylpyrrolidin-2-yl)pyridinium bromide (compound 2, D2R agonist and nAChR antagonist)

=== Dual D_{2}AR/ A_{2A}AR ligands ===
- Dual agonists for A_{2A}AR and D2AR receptors have been developed.

=== Functionally selective ligands ===
- UNC9994

== Protein–protein interactions ==
The dopamine receptor D_{2} has been shown to interact with EPB41L1, PPP1R9B and NCS-1.

=== Receptor oligomers ===
The D_{2} receptor forms receptor heterodimers in vivo (i.e., in living animals) with other G protein-coupled receptors; these include:

- D_{1}–D_{2} dopamine receptor heteromer
- D_{2}–adenosine A_{2A}
- D_{2}–ghrelin receptor
- D_{2sh}–TAAR1 (Note: D2sh–TAAR1 is a presynaptic heterodimer which involves the relocation of TAAR1 from the intracellular space to D2sh at the plasma membrane, increased D2sh agonist binding affinity, and signal transduction through the calcium–PKC–NFAT pathway and G-protein independent PKB–GSK3 pathway.)

The D_{2} receptor has been shown to form heterodimers in vitro (and possibly in vivo) with DRD_{3}, DRD_{5}, and 5-HT_{2A}.

== See also ==
- Prolactin modulator
