= Dopamine receptor D3 =

Subtype of Dopamine Receptor

DRD3
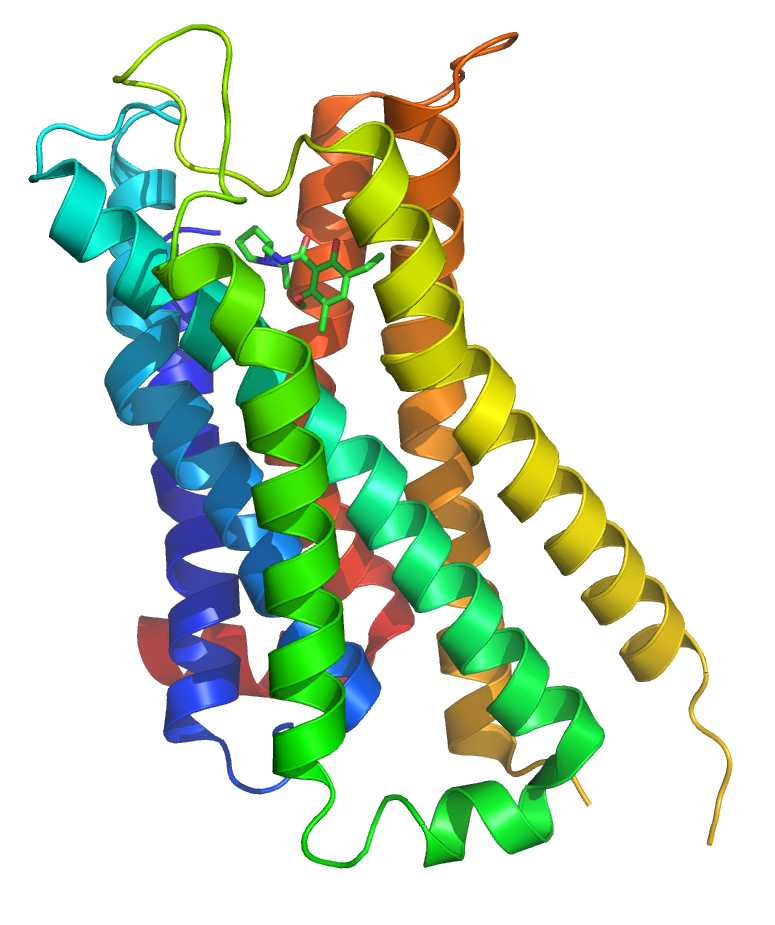
Available structures
PDB	Ortholog search: PDBe RCSB
PDB	List of PDB id codes 3PBL

Identifiers
- Aliases: DRD3, D3DR, ETM1, FET1, dopamine receptor D3
- External IDs: OMIM: 126451; MGI: 94925; HomoloGene: 623; GeneCards: DRD3; OMA:DRD3 - orthologs

Gene location (Human)
Chr.	Chromosome 3 (human)
Band	3q13.31	Start	114,127,580 bp
Band	3q13.31	End	114,199,407 bp

Gene location (Mouse)
Chr.	Chromosome 16 (mouse)
Band	16 B4|16 28.44 cM	Start	43,574,389 bp
Band	16 B4|16 28.44 cM	End	43,643,295 bp
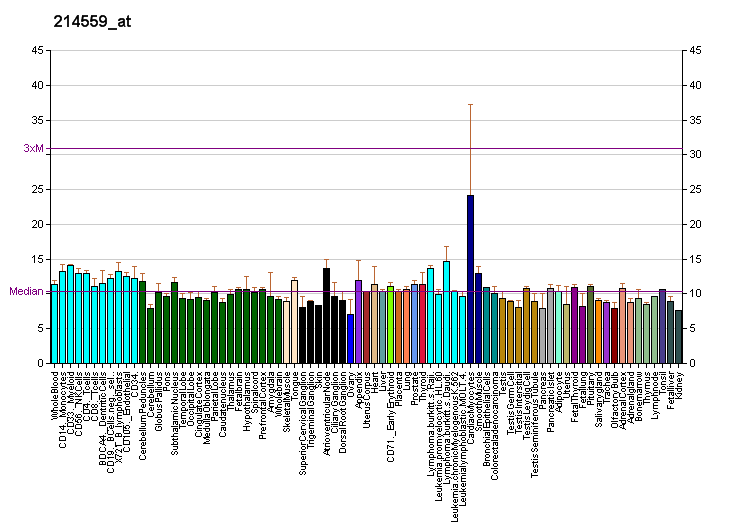

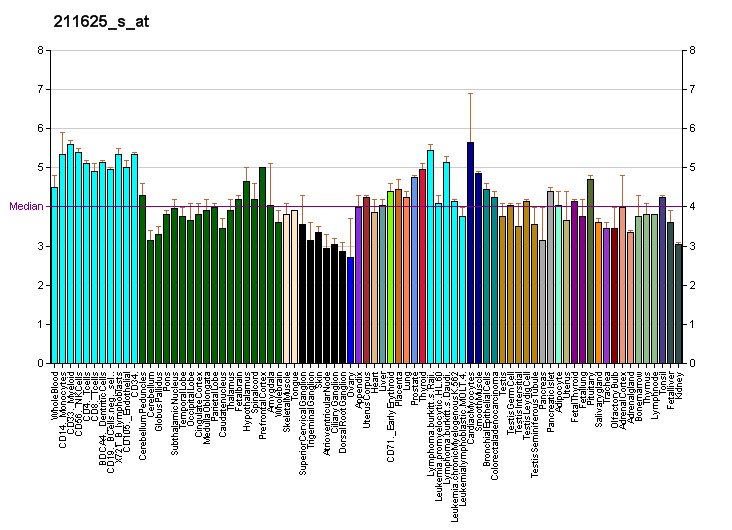
RNA expression pattern
Bgee	Human / Mouse (ortholog); Top expressed in: testicle; nucleus accumbens; putamen; caudate nucleus; granulocyte; prefrontal cortex; lymph node; hypothalamus; left testis; right testis / Top expressed in: morula; zygote; superior frontal gyrus; right ventricle; lumbar subsegment of spinal cord; ventricular zone; meninges; dentate gyrus of hippocampal formation granule cell; blastocyst; tibiofemoral joint; More reference expression data
BioGPS	More reference expression data
Gene ontology
Molecular function	protein binding; signal transducer activity; G protein-coupled receptor activity; dopamine neurotransmitter receptor activity; dopamine neurotransmitter receptor activity, coupled via Gi/Go; dopamine binding; protein domain specific binding; D1 dopamine receptor binding; adrenergic receptor activity
Cellular component	endocytic vesicle; apical part of cell; cell projection; integral component of membrane; membrane; plasma membrane; integral component of plasma membrane; dopaminergic synapse; glutamatergic synapse; GABA-ergic synapse; integral component of postsynaptic density membrane
Biological process	negative regulation of sodium:proton antiporter activity; dopamine receptor signaling pathway; dopamine metabolic process; regulation of circadian sleep/wake cycle, sleep; negative regulation of dopamine receptor signaling pathway; positive regulation of cell population proliferation; regulation of dopamine uptake involved in synaptic transmission; response to histamine; response to ethanol; prepulse inhibition; social behavior; learning; positive regulation of renal sodium excretion; arachidonic acid secretion; negative regulation of protein secretion; negative regulation of transcription by RNA polymerase II; gastric emptying; regulation of blood volume by renin-angiotensin; regulation of locomotion involved in locomotory behavior; cellular calcium ion homeostasis; regulation of locomotion; learning or memory; response to amphetamine; positive regulation of transcription by RNA polymerase II; positive regulation of cytokinesis; signal transduction; regulation of lipid metabolic process; regulation of multicellular organism growth; visual learning; G protein-coupled receptor internalization; regulation of dopamine secretion; negative regulation of protein kinase B signaling; adenylate cyclase-activating dopamine receptor signaling pathway; locomotory behavior; behavioral response to cocaine; negative regulation of blood pressure; acid secretion; musculoskeletal movement, spinal reflex action; positive regulation of dopamine receptor signaling pathway; circadian regulation of gene expression; response to morphine; negative regulation of oligodendrocyte differentiation; adenylate cyclase-inhibiting dopamine receptor signaling pathway; positive regulation of mitotic nuclear division; response to cocaine; synaptic transmission, dopaminergic; G protein-coupled receptor signaling pathway; autophagy; negative regulation of apoptotic process; regulation of neurotransmitter uptake; regulation of postsynaptic neurotransmitter receptor internalization; adenylate cyclase-modulating G protein-coupled receptor signaling pathway; adenylate cyclase-activating adrenergic receptor signaling pathway
Sources:Amigo / QuickGO
Orthologs
Species	Human	Mouse
Entrez	1814	13490
Ensembl	ENSG00000151577	ENSMUSG00000022705
UniProt	P35462	P30728
RefSeq (mRNA)	NM_000796; NM_001282563; NM_001290809; NM_033658; NM_033659 NM_033660; NM_033663	NM_007877
RefSeq (protein)	NP_000787; NP_001269492; NP_001277738; NP_387512	NP_031903
Location (UCSC)	Chr 3: 114.13 – 114.2 Mb	Chr 16: 43.57 – 43.64 Mb
PubMed search
- Wikidata
View/Edit Human	View/Edit Mouse

Dopamine receptor D_{3} (DRD3) is a protein belonging to the dopamine receptor family of G protein-coupled receptors. In humans, it is encoded by the DRD3 gene located on chromosome 3q13.3.

== Signaling ==
The D_{3} receptor belongs to the D2-like receptor subfamily, which also includes D2 and D4 receptors. It couples primarily to Gi/Go proteins, leading to inhibition of adenylyl cyclase and reduced intracellular cAMP levels.

The D_{3} receptor displays the highest binding affinity for dopamine among dopamine receptor subtypes, making it a key regulator of tonic dopamine signaling.

== Expression ==
D_{3} receptors are primarily expressed in limbic brain regions such as the nucleus accumbens, islands of Calleja, and olfactory tubercle. Their distribution in phylogenetically older brain areas suggests an important role in emotion, motivation, and cognition.

== Function ==
Activation of the D_{3} receptor regulates dopamine release and modulates neuronal excitability. Preclinical and clinical studies implicate it in:

- Parkinson's disease – D_{3} agonists such as pramipexole and rotigotine show neuroprotective effects, reduce alpha-synuclein aggregation, and improve motor and non-motor symptoms.
- Neuropsychiatric disorders – Altered DRD3 signaling has been associated with schizophrenia, bipolar disorder, and major depression. Some D_{3} ligands exert antidepressant-like effects in animal models.
- Addiction – D_{3} receptors modulate reward pathways; antagonists such as SB-277011-A show promise in reducing drug-seeking behavior in preclinical models.

== Genetic polymorphisms ==
The DRD3 Ser9Gly polymorphism (rs6280) alters receptor binding characteristics and has been studied in relation to:

- Severity of depression in Parkinson's disease
- Impulse control disorders and behavioral addictions

== Pharmacology ==
D_{3} ligands include:

- Agonists: pramipexole, ropinirole, rotigotine, 7-OH-DPAT, apomorphine,
- Partial agonists: aripiprazole, brexpiprazole, cariprazine, BP1.4979
- Antagonists: ABT-925, amisulpride, haloperidol, NGB-2904, SB-277011-A
- Allosteric modulators: SB269652

Many of these ligands are used clinically in Parkinson's disease or schizophrenia, while others remain experimental.

== Protein interactions ==
The D_{3} receptor has been shown to interact with:

- CLIC6, an intracellular chloride channel protein
- EPB41L1, a cytoskeletal protein involved in membrane localization of GPCRs

== Clinical significance ==
- Therapeutic target – Due to its role in motor control, motivation, and reward, DRD3 is a therapeutic target for Parkinson's disease, schizophrenia, and substance use disorders.
- Drug design – High selectivity ligands for D_{3} are actively pursued to minimize side effects associated with D_{2} receptor blockade.
- Biomarker potential – Polymorphisms in DRD3 are under investigation as genetic biomarkers for treatment response and psychiatric vulnerability.

== See also ==
- Dopamine receptor D2
- Dopamine receptor D4
- Parkinson's disease
- Schizophrenia
