= Lixosicone =

Chemical compound

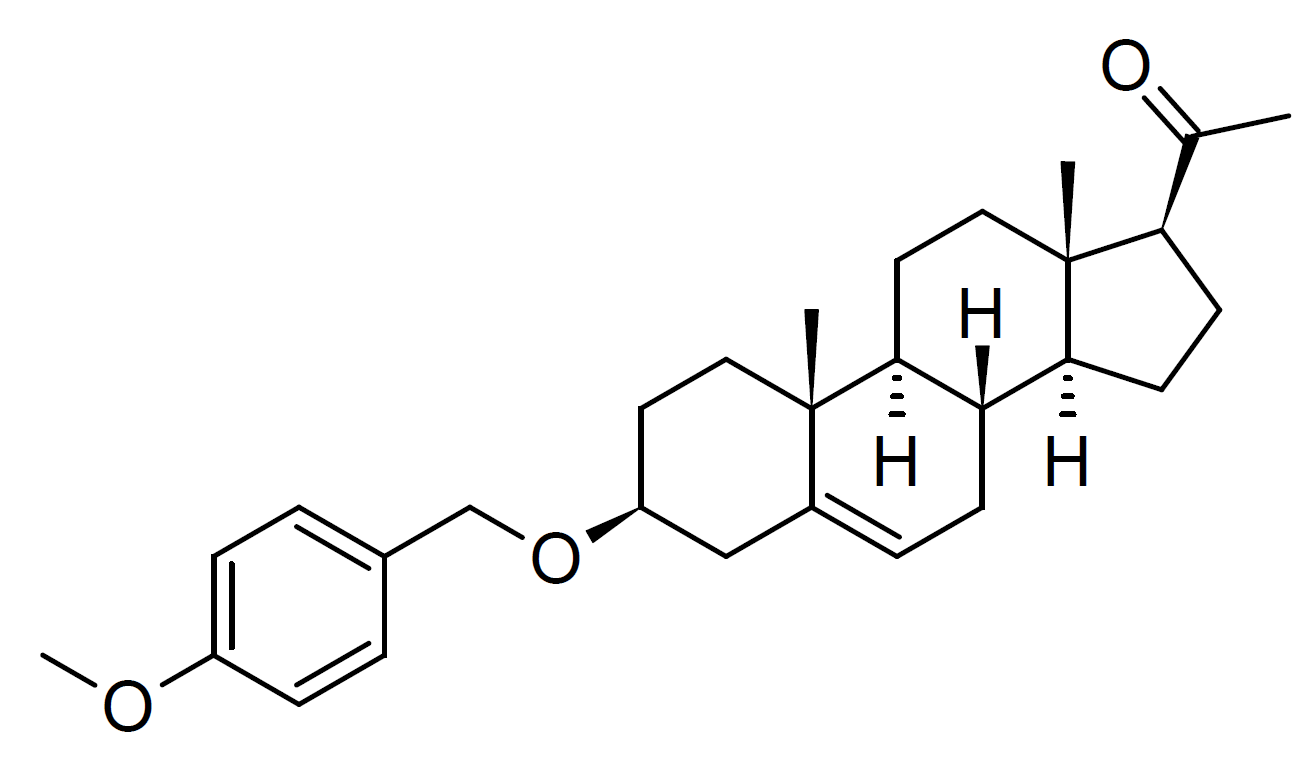

Clinical data
- Other names: AEF0117; AEF-0117; 3β-(4-Methoxybenzyloxy)pregn-5-en-20-one
- Drug class: Cannabinoid CB_{1} receptor negative allosteric modulator

Identifiers
- IUPAC name: 1-[(3S,8S,9S,10R,13S,14S,17S)-3-[(4-methoxyphenyl)methoxy]-10,13-dimethyl-2,3,4,7,8,9,11,12,14,15,16,17-dodecahydro-1H-cyclopenta[a]phenanthren-17-yl]ethanone
- CAS Number: 1610878-71-1
- PubChem CID: 139433957
- ChemSpider: 129421614
- UNII: 9LG9CT78SV

Chemical and physical data
- Formula: C_{29}H_{40}O_{3}
- Molar mass: 436.636 g·mol^{−1}
- 3D model (JSmol): Interactive image
- SMILES: CC(=O)[C@H]1CC[C@@H]2[C@@]1(CC[C@H]3[C@H]2CC=C4[C@@]3(CC[C@@H](C4)OCC5=CC=C(C=C5)OC)C)C
- InChI: InChI=1S/C29H40O3/c1-19(30)25-11-12-26-24-10-7-21-17-23(32-18-20-5-8-22(31-4)9-6-20)13-15-28(21,2)27(24)14-16-29(25,26)3/h5-9,23-27H,10-18H2,1-4H3/t23-,24-,25+,26-,27-,28-,29+/m0/s1; Key:AAZPIQPULVRHOW-SFKJMYEFSA-N

Lixosicone (AEF0117, 3β-(4-methoxybenzyloxy)pregn-5-en-20-one) is a compound derived from pregnenolone by Aelis Farma, which acts as a biased negative allosteric modulator of the cannabinoid CB_{1} receptor, representing a new class of compounds referred to as CB_{1}-selective signalling-specific inhibitors (CB_{1}-SSi). It binds to an allosteric site on the CB_{1} receptor and modifies the downstream signalling produced as a result of CB_{1} activation, preventing CB_{1} mediated changes to mitogen-activated protein kinase (MAPK) phosphorylation but without affecting the signalling mediated by cyclic AMP. Unlike pregnenolone, AEF0117 is specific for the CB_{1}-SSi activity and lacks the neurosteroid action typical of many structurally related compounds.

In Phase II human clinical trials in patients diagnosed with cannabis use disorder, AEF0117 was found to partly but not completely block the effects of THC, and reduced cannabis self-administration but without producing an acute withdrawal syndrome and with relatively mild side effects. It is hoped that compounds of this type may be useful either as medications for the treatment of cannabinoid dependence, or could be used alongside medicinal cannabis to reduce unwanted side effects while retaining therapeutic efficacy.

As of March 2026, lixosicone is in phase 2 clinical trials for treatment of substance-related disorders. It is being developed by Aelis Farma.

== See also ==
- List of investigational substance-related disorder drugs
- GAT100
- Org 27569
- PSNCBAM-1
- Rimonabant
