= List of investigational substance-related disorder drugs =

Investigational substance-related disorder drugs

This is a list of investigational substance-related disorder drugs, or drugs that are currently under development for clinical use for the treatment of substance-related disorders but are not yet approved. Substance-related disorders include substance use disorders like alcoholism (alcohol use disorder), amphetamine use disorder, cocaine use disorder, nicotine use disorder, and opioid use disorder, among others. In addition, they include substance withdrawal syndromes like alcohol withdrawal and opioid withdrawal as well as substance overdoses like opioid overdose.

Chemical/generic names are listed first, with developmental code names, synonyms, and brand names in parentheses. The format of list items is "Name (Synonyms) – Mechanism of Action – Indication [Reference]".

This list was last comprehensively updated in January 2026. It is likely to become outdated with time.

== Under development ==
=== Phase 3 ===
- Brenipatide (LY-3537031) – glucagon-like peptide-1 (GLP-1) receptor agonist, gastric inhibitory polypeptide (GIP) receptor agonist – alcoholism
- Ketamine (AWKN-001; AWKN-P-001) – ionotropic glutamate NMDA receptor antagonist and dissociative hallucinogen – alcoholism
- Naloxone intranasal (FMXIN-001; NS-001; naloxone microspheres powder nasal spray) – μ-opioid receptor antagonist – opioid-related disorders
- Ondansetron (AD-04) – serotonin 5-HT_{3} receptor antagonist – alcoholism
- Zolpidem (ALM-006; ALM006) – GABA_{A} receptor positive allosteric modulator/nonbenzodiazepine – substance-related disorders

=== Phase 2/3 ===
- Metyrapone/oxazepam (EMB-001C; EMB-001) – combination of metyrapone (11β-hydroxylase inhibitor and cortisol synthesis inhibitor) and oxazepam (benzodiazepine/GABA_{A} receptor positive allosteric modulator) – smoking withdrawal
- NFL-101 (tobacco leaf extract) – immunomodulator (smoking vaccine) – smoking withdrawal

=== Phase 2 ===
- ASP-8062 – GABA_{B} receptor positive allosteric modulator – alcoholism
- BP-1.3656B (BP-1.3656; BP1.3656B; BP13656) – histamine H_{3} receptor antagonist – alcoholism
- BP-1.4979 (BP-1.4979; BP-14979; BP14979) – dopamine D_{3} receptor partial agonist – smoking withdrawal
- Brenipatide (LY-3537031) – glucagon-like peptide-1 (GLP-1) receptor agonist, gastric inhibitory polypeptide (GIP) receptor agonist – smoking withdrawal
- Buprenorphine sublingual ethanol-free (CHF-6563; CHF6563) – μ-opioid receptor agonist, δ-opioid receptor agonist, κ-opioid receptor antagonist, nociceptin receptor agonist – opioid-related disorders
- Buprenorphine/naloxone (naloxone/buprenorphine) – combination of buprenorphine (non-selective opioid receptor modulator) and naloxone (orally/sublingually inactive opioid receptor antagonist) – opioid-related disorders
- Bupropion/dextromethorphan (bupropion/DXM; Auvelity; AXS-05) – combination of bupropion (norepinephrine–dopamine reuptake inhibitor (NDRI), nicotinic acetylcholine receptor antagonist, CYP2D6 inhibitor) and dextromethorphan (DXM) (NMDA receptor antagonist, serotonin reuptake inhibitor, sigma receptor agonist, other actions) – smoking withdrawal
- Bupropion/naltrexone (Contrave; CX-101; Mysimba; naltrexone/bupropion; NB32) – combination of bupropion (norepinephrine–dopamine reuptake inhibitor (NDRI), nicotinic acetylcholine receptor antagonist) and naltrexone (opioid receptor antagonist) – smoking withdrawal
- Cannabidiol (CBD; A-1002-N5S; Nantheia) – cannabinoid/various actions – opioid-related disorders, smoking withdrawal
- Cannabidiol (CBD; Epidiolex; Epidyolex; Epidiolexa; GW-42003; GWP-42003; GWP-42003-P; JZP-926) – cannabinoid/various actions – heroin-related disorders, opioid-related disorders
- Centanafadine (CTN-SR; EB-1020) – serotonin–norepinephrine–dopamine reuptake inhibitor (SNDRI) – smoking withdrawal
- Cocaine esterase (RBP-8000; TNX-1300) – enzyme replacement – cocaine-related disorders
- Cyproheptadine/prazosin (KT-110; Periactine/Alpress) – combination of cyproheptadine (various actions) and prazosin (α_{1}-adrenergic receptor antagonist) – alcoholism
- Devextinetug (anti-methamphetamine chimeric monoclonal antibody; Ch-mAb7F9; IXT-m200; METH-mAb) – immunomodulator (monocloncal antibody against methamphetamine) – substance-related disorders
- F-652 (IL-22 IgG2 Fusion Protein; IL-22 IgG2-Fc; rhIL-22 dimer) – interleukin, immunoglobulin Fc fragment, recombinant fusion protein, anti-inflammatory, hepatoprotectant – alcoholism and alcoholic hepatitis
- Ibudilast (AV-411; Eyevinal; Ibinal; KC-404; Ketas; MN-166; Pinatos) – phosphodiesterase PDE4 inhibitor, toll-like receptor 4 (TLR4) antagonist – alcoholism, opioid-related disorders, substance-related disorders
- Liraglutide (LATIN-T1D; NN-2211; NN-9211; NN-8022; NNC-90-1170; Saxenda; Victoza) – glucagon-like peptide-1 (GLP-1) receptor agonist – smoking withdrawal
- Lixosicone (AEF-0117; AEF0117) – biased cannabinoid CB_{1} receptor negative allosteric modulator (pregnenolone derivative) – substance-related disorders
- Mavoglurant (AFQ-056; STP-7) – metabotropic glutamate mGlu_{5} receptor antagonist – alcoholism
- Mazdutide (IBI-362; LY-3305677; OXM-3) – glucagon-like peptide-1 (GLP-1) receptor agonist, glucagon receptor agonist – alcoholism
- Mebufotenin benzoate (5-MeO-DMT; BPL-002; BPL-003) – non-selective serotonin receptor agonist, serotonin 5-HT_{1A} and 5-HT_{2A} receptor agonist, serotonergic psychedelic – alcoholism
- Metyrapone/oxazepam (EMB-001C; EMB-001) – combination of metyrapone (11β-hydroxylase inhibitor and cortisol synthesis inhibitor) and oxazepam (benzodiazepine/GABA_{A} receptor positive allosteric modulator) – cocaine-related disorders
- Midomafetamine (MDMA) – serotonin–norepinephrine–dopamine releasing agent (SNDRA), serotonin 5-HT_{2} receptor agonist, entactogen – alcoholism
- Mifepristone (C-1073; Corlux; Corluxin; Korlym; Mifegyne; Mifeprex; RU-38486; RU-486) – glucocorticoid, progesterone, and androgen receptor antagonist – alcoholism
- Miricorilant (CORT-118335) – glucocorticoid and mineralocorticoid receptor antagonist – alcoholism
- Nadolol (INV-102; INV102) – non-selective beta blocker (β_{1}- and β_{2} adrenergic receptor agonist) – smoking withdrawal
- Neboglamine (nebostinel; CR-2249; XY-2401) – ionotropic glutamate glycine-gated NMDA receptor agonist – cocaine-related disorders
- NNC0194-0499 (NN-9500; NN-9499; NNC-0194-0499) – fibroblast growth factor (FGF) receptor agonist – substance-related disorders
- NS-2359 (GSK-372475) – serotonin–norepinephrine–dopamine reuptake inhibitor (SNDRI) – cocaine-related disorders
- OMS-405 (OMS405) – PPARγ agonist – opioid-related disorders, smoking withdrawal
- Pemvidutide (ALT-801- Altimmune; SP-1373; VPD-107) – glucagon-like peptide-1 (GLP-1) receptor agonists, glucagon receptor agonist – alcoholism
- Psilocybin (SYNP-101; synthetic psilocybin) – non-selective serotonin receptor agonist, serotonin 5-HT_{2A} receptor agonist, and serotonergic psychedelic – alcoholism
- Selonabant (ANEB-001; V-24343) – cannabinoid CB_{1} receptor antagonist – substance-related disorders
- Sunobinop (IMB-115; IT-1315; RSC117957; S-117957; V-117957) – nociceptin receptor agonist – alcoholism
- TA-CD (TA-CD; TA-CD09) – immunostimulant (cocaine vaccine) – cocaine-related disorders
- Zabaglurant (Heptares 25; HTL-0014242; HTL14242; TMP-301) – metabotropic glutamate mGlu_{5} receptor negative allosteric modulator – alcoholism
- Zolunicant (18-methoxycoronaridine; 18-MC; MM-110) – α_{3}β_{4} nicotinic acetylcholine receptor antagonist – opioid-related disorders

=== Phase 1/2 ===
- Dexmedetomidine (BXCL-501; Igalmi; KalmPen) – α_{2}-adrenergic receptor agonist – opioid-related disorders
- Ibogaine (DMX-1002; IBX-210) – various actions/unknown mechanism of action and oneirogen/hallucinogen – opioid-related disorders
- 5-Methoxy-2-aminoindane (MEAI; 5-MeO-AI; CMND-100) – serotonin–norepinephrine releasing agent – alcoholism
- PT-00114 (PT100114; TCAP-1) – corticotropin-releasing hormone (CRH) inhibitor – opioid-related disorders

=== Phase 1 ===
- AZD-4041 – orexin OX_{1} receptor antagonist – opioid-related disorders
- BI-1356225 – ghrelin O-acyltransferase (GOAT) inhibitor – opioid-related disorders
- Cebranopadol (GRT-6005; PRK-101; TRN-228) – μ-opioid receptor agonist, nociceptin receptor agonist – substance-related disorders
- CSX-1004 – monoclonal antibody against fentanyl – opioid-related disorders
- Dimethyltryptamine/harmine (DMT/harmine; RE-01) – combination of dimethyltryptamine (DMT) (serotonin 5-HT_{2A} receptor agonist and serotonergic psychedelic) and harmine (monoamine oxidase inhibitor (MAOI) and other actions) – cocaine-related disorders
- DPI-125 (MCP-201) – μ-opioid receptor agonist, δ-opioid receptor agonist, κ-opioid receptor agonist – opioid-related disorders
- Ibuprofen/ketotifen (SJP-005) – combination of ibuprofen (cyclooxygenase (COX) inhibitor/NSAID) and ketotifen (histamine H_{1} receptor antagonist, other actions) – opioid-related disorders
- Icalcaprant (ABBV-1354; CVL-354) – κ-opioid receptor antagonist – opioid-related disorders
- KNX-100 (SOC-1) – oxytocin-like drug / indirect oxytocin receptor modulator – opioid-related disorders, substance-related disorders
- Mavoglurant (AFQ-056; STP-7) – metabotropic glutamate mGlu_{5} receptor antagonist – cocaine-related disorders
- MEB-1170 – μ-opioid receptor biased agonist – opioid-related disorders
- Mebufotenin (5-MeO-DMT) – non-selective serotonin receptor agonist, serotonin 5-HT_{1A} and 5-HT_{2A} receptor agonist, and serotonergic psychedelic – substance use disorders
- MST-01 – undefined mechanism of action – smoking withdrawal
- Nalmefene (AV-104; TH-104) – μ-opioid receptor antagonist, κ-opioid receptor weak partial agonist – opioid-related disorders
- Naltrexone implantable pellets (BICX-102, BICX-104) – opioid receptor antagonist – alcoholism, opioid-related disorders, substance-related disorders
- Nezavist (DCUK-OEt) – peripherally selective GABA_{A} receptor positive allosteric modulator (etomidate site) – alcoholism
- Noribogaine (DMX-1001) – various actions – alcoholism
- NRS-033 (nalmefene prodrug) – μ-opioid receptor antagonist, κ-opioid receptor weak partial agonist – opioid-related disorders
- OMS-527 (OMS-182399; OMS527) – phosphodiesterase PDE7 inhibitor – cocaine-related disorders
- Psilocybin (MLS-101/MLS101) – non-selective serotonin receptor agonist, serotonin 5-HT_{2A} receptor agonist, serotonergic psychedelic – opioid-related disorders
- Smoking cessation therapeutics - Astraea Therapeutics – nicotinic acetylcholine receptor antagonists – smoking withdrawal
- SXC-2023 – cystine/glutamate transporter (SLC7A11) – cocaine-related disorders
- Tezampanel (LY-293558; NGX-424; PRN-001-01) – ionotropic glutamate AMPA and kainate receptor antagonist – opioid-related disorders
- Zabaglurant (Heptares 25; HTL-0014242; HTL14242; TMP-301) – metabotropic glutamate mGlu_{5} receptor negative allosteric modulator – cocaine-related disorders, substance-related disorders

=== Preclinical ===
- AM-510 – undefined mechanism of action – opioid-related disorders
- ATI-1013 – monoclonal antibody against nicotine – smoking withdrawal
- CTRX-1001 – immunostimulant – opioid-related disorders
- CTRX-2001 – immunostimulant – opioid-related disorders
- Cyclobenzaprine (KRL-102; TNX-102; Tonmya; VLD-cyclobenzaprine) – tricyclic antidepressant (various actions) – alcoholism
- Cyproheptadine/prazosin (KT-110; Periactine/Alpress) – combination of cyproheptadine (various actions) and prazosin (α_{1}-adrenergic receptor antagonist) – cocaine-related disorders
- Dimethyltryptamine (DMT; EBRX-101) – non-selective serotonin receptor agonist, serotonin 5-HT_{2A} receptor agonist, and serotonergic psychedelic – alcoholism
- EQL-101 – undefined mechanism of action (non-hallucinogenic non-cardiotoxic ibogaine derivative) – substance use disorders
- Flumazenil/naloxone transdermal patch (MX-1607; RescuePatch) – combination of flumazenil (GABA_{A} receptor negative allosteric modulator/benzodiazepine antagonist) and naloxone (opioid receptor antagonist) – substance-related disorders
- GM-3009 – κ-opioid receptor agonist (noribogaine analogue) – opioid-related disorders
- INDV-1000 (GABA_{B} PAM) – GABA_{B} receptor positive allosteric modulator – substance-related disorders
- KB-128 – serotonin 5-HT_{2C} receptor G protein-biased agonist, serotonin 5-HT_{2A} and 5-HT_{2B} receptor antagonist – alcoholism
- LPH-48 – undefined mechanism of action and serotonergic psychedelic ((shorter-acting LPH-5 analogue) – alcoholism
- M-101 – GABA receptor antagonist – substance-related disorders
- 5-Methoxy-2-aminoindane (MEAI; 5-MeO-AI; CMND-100) – serotonin–norepinephrine releasing agent – cocaine-related disorders
- Metyrapone/oxazepam (EMB-001C; EMB-001) – combination of metyrapone (11β-hydroxylase inhibitor and cortisol synthesis inhibitor) and oxazepam (benzodiazepine/GABA_{A} receptor positive allosteric modulator) – substance-related disorders
- Midomafetamine microneedle transdermal patch (MDMA; ecstasy) – serotonin, norepinephrine, and dopamine releasing agent, weak serotonin 5-HT_{2} receptor agonist, entactogen – substance-related disorders
- Naltrexone controlled-release (BICX101, BICX-101) – opioid receptor antagonist – alcoholism, opioid-related disorders
- Nicotine degrading enzyme (ATI-3009; NicA2; NicA2-J1) – enzyme – smoking withdrawal
- PPL-138 (BU10038, BU-10038) – nociceptin receptor agonist, μ-opioid receptor agonist, opioid peptide agonist – alcoholism, cocaine-related disorders
- PSIL-001 (DMT analogue) – non-hallucinogenic serotonin 5-HT_{1} receptor modulator – substance-related disorders
- PSIL-002 (DMT analogue) – non-hallucinogenic serotonin 5-HT_{1} receptor modulator – substance-related disorders
- Psilacetin (O-acetylpsilocin; 4-AcO-DMT) – non-selective serotonin receptor agonist, serotonin 5-HT_{2A} receptor agonist, serotonergic psychedelic – substance-related disorders
- Pudafensine (IP-2015; IP-2017; IPNP-2015; IPTN-2021) – serotonin–norepinephrine–dopamine reuptake inhibitor – substance-related disorders
- Research programme: psychedelic-based neurological therapeutics - Psilera – undefined mechanism of action and serotonergic psychedelics – alcoholism
- Research programme: psychoplastogen therapeutics - Collaborations Pharmaceuticals – undefined mechanism of action – opioid-related disorders
- SVN-015 – serotonin–dopamine reuptake inhibitor – substance-related disorders
- SXC-2023 – cystine–glutamate antiporter (SLC7A11; System x_{c-} or Sxc) activator – cocaine-related disorders, smoking withdrawal
- TACT411 – serotonin 5-HT_{1B} receptor modulator and monoamine transporter modulator – alcoholism
- TACT523 – undefined mechanism of action – alcoholism
- TACT833 – serotonin 5-HT_{1B} receptor modulator and monoamine transporter modulator – alcoholism
- VS-01 (VS-01-HAC) – ammonia scavenger – substance-related disorders

=== Research ===
- AM-1006 – undefined mechanism of action (short-acting subperceptual psychoactive drug) – substance use disorders
- EQL-101 – undefined mechanism of action (non-hallucinogenic non-cardiotoxic ibogaine derivative) – substance use disorders – Equulus Therapeutics
- Ibogaine – various actions, oneirogen/hallucinogen – substance-related disorders
- Mebufotenin (5-MeO-DMT; LSR-2000) – non-selective serotonin receptor agonist, serotonin 5-HT_{1A} and 5-HT_{2A} receptor agonist, serotonergic psychedelic – alcoholism
- MYCO-004 (patch-delivered tryptamine compound) – undefined mechanism of action, serotonergic psychedelic – smoking withdrawal, substance-related disorders
- Research programme: Ibogaine derivatives - MindMed/Nextage Therapeutics – various actions – opioid-related disorders
- Research programme: monoclonal antibody therapeutics - CounterX Therapeutics – undefined mechanism of action – opioid-related disorders
- Research programme: psychedelic and empathogenic compounds subcutaneous - Bexson Biomedical – undefined mechanism of action – substance-related disorders
- Substance-related disorders therapeutics - Tessara Therapeutics/Xylo Bio/University of Sydney – neuronal plasticity modulators – substance-related disorders
- VVZ-2471 – metabotropic glutamate mGlu_{5} receptor antagonist, serotonin 5-HT_{2A} receptor antagonist – opioid-related disorders

=== Clinical phase unknown ===
- Nicotine orally-dissolving film (NAL-2762) – nicotinic acetylcholine receptor agonist – smoking withdrawal

=== Phase unknown ===
- AP-002 (AP002) – undefined mechanism of action – opioid-related disorders
- AP-005 (AP005) – undefined mechanism of action – opioid-related disorders
- Varenicline implant (SK-2109) – nicotinic acetylcholine receptor agonist – smoking withrawal

== Not under development ==
=== No development reported ===
- AD-6626 – aldehyde dehydrogenase 2 (ALDH2) inhibitor – alcoholism
- AM-6527 (AM6527) – cannabinoid CB_{1} receptor antagonist – substance-related disorders
- Amitifadine (DOV-21947; EB-1010) – serotonin–norepinephrine–dopamine reuptake inhibitor (SNDRI) – alcoholism, opioid-related disorders, smoking withdrawal, substance-related disorders
- Arbaclofen extended release – GABA_{B} receptor agonist – opioid-related disorders
- BMB-101 – serotonin 5-HT_{2} receptor agonist – opioid-related disorders
- Bupropion/mecamylamine (INT-0003; QuitPak) – combination of bupropion (norepinephrine–dopamine reuptake inhibitor (NDRI), nicotinic acetylcholine receptor negative allosteric modulator) and mecamylamine (non-selective nicotinic acetylcholine receptor antagonist) – smoking withdrawal
- Cannabidiol (CBD; cannabidiol transderma/topical gel/patch; Zygel; ZYN-002) – cannabinoid/various actions – alcoholism, substance-related disorders
- CM-1212 – undefined mechanism of action – alcoholism, substance-related disorders
- CPP-115 – GABA transaminase (GABA-T) inhibitor – substance-related disorders
- CT-044 analogues - CERSCI Therapeutics – reactive oxygen species (ROS) inhibitors (CT-044 analogues) – opioid-related disorders
- CX-717 (CX717) – AMPA receptor positive allosteric modulator (ampakine) – substance-related disorders
- Cyproheptadine/prazosin (KT-110; Periactine/Alpress) – combination of cyproheptadine (various actions) and prazosin (α_{1}-adrenergic receptor antagonist) – substance-related disorders
- DCR-AUD (DCR-A1203; NN-6020) – aldehyde dehydrogenase 2 (ALDH2) inhibitor, RNA interference – alcoholism
- Dimethyltryptamine (DMT; EBRX-101) – non-selective serotonin receptor agonist, serotonin 5-HT_{2A} receptor agonist, and serotonergic psychedelic – smoking withdrawal
- GLWL-01 – ghrelin O-acyltransferase (GOAT) inhibitor – alcoholism
- GSK-598809 (GSK598809) – dopamine D_{3} receptor antagonist – smoking withdrawal, substance-related disorders
- GSK-1521498 – μ-opioid receptor inverse agonist – cocaine-related disorders
- GTS-21 (DMXB-A; DMBX-anabaseine) – nicotinic acetylcholine receptor agonist – smoking withdrawal
- Icalcaprant (ABBV-1354; CVL-354) – κ-opioid receptor antagonist – substance-related disorders
- Levodopa (CVT-301; CXG-89; Inbrija) – dopamine precursor (non-selective dopamine receptor agonist) – smoking withdrawal
- Mazindol controlled release (NLS-0; NLS-1; NLS-10; NLS-13; NLS-2; Nolazol; Quilience) – serotonin–norepinephrine–dopamine reuptake inhibitor (SNDRI) – opioid-related disorders
- Midomafetamine (MDMA; ecstasy) – serotonin–norepinephrine–dopamine releasing agent (SNDRA), serotonin 5-HT_{2} receptor agonist, and entactogen – substance-related disorders
- Mifepristone (C-1073; Corlux; Corluxin; Korlym; Mifegyne; Mifeprex; RU-38486; RU-486) – glucocorticoid, progesterone, and androgen receptor antagonist – smoking withdrawal
- Modafinil oral (ASB) – atypical dopamine reuptake inhibitor (DRI) – cocaine-related disorders
- Naloxone nasal spray (-12; LT-20; LT-21; LT-22; Naloxon B; Narcan Nasal Spray; OPNT-001) – μ-opioid receptor antagonist – cocaine-related disorders, substance-related disorders
- Nalmefene implant (nalmefene six-month implant) – μ-opioid receptor antagonist, κ-opioid receptor weak partial agonist – opioid-related disorders
- Naloxone buccal/intransal gel (Exonal) – opioid receptor antagonist – opioid-related disorders
- Nicotine abuse vaccine (Niccine) – nicotinic acetylcholine receptor agonist – smoking withdrawal
- Nicotine/cannabidiol chewing gum (nicotine/CBD; CVSI-007) – combination of nicotine (nicotinic acetylcholine receptor agonist) and cannabidiol (CBD) (cannabinoid/various actions) – smoking withdrawal
- Noribogaine derived therapeutic – various actions (noribogaine derivative) – opioid-related disorders
- OMS-405 (OMS405) – PPARγ agonist – alcoholism
- Ondansetron (AD-04) – serotonin 5-HT_{3} receptor antagonist – opioid-related disorders, smoking withdrawal
- Ondansetron/topiramate (AD-01; AD/TO-01) – combination of ondansetron (serotonin 5-HT_{3} receptor antagonist) and topiramate (various actions) – alcoholism
- Ondelopran (LY-2196044; Odelepan; Odelepran; OpRA) – opioid receptor antagonist – alcoholism
- OPNT-005 (OPNT005; adjuvanted heroin analogue vaccine; diamorphine analogue vaccine; heroin vaccine) – immunostimulant (vaccine against heroin) – heroin-related disorders
- PF-5402536 (NIC7-001; PF-5402536) – immunostimulant (smoking vaccine) – smoking withdrawal
- Pomaglumetad methionil (DB103; LY-2140023; LY-2812223; LY-404039 prodrug) – metabotropic glutamate mGlu_{2} and mGlu_{3} receptor receptor agonist (pomaglumetad prodrug) – substance-related disorders
- PPL-103 – μ-opioid receptor agonist, δ-opioid receptor agonist, κ-opioid receptor agonist – substance-related disorders
- Pregnenolone methyl ether (3β-methoxypregnenolone; MAP-4343) – microtubule-associated protein (MAP) stimulant and tubulin polymerization promoter – substance-related disorders
- Psilocybin (MYCO-001; MYCO-003) – non-selective serotonin receptor agonist, serotonin 5-HT_{2A} receptor agonist, and serotonergic psychedelic – substance-related disorders
- PT-150 (PT150; ORG-34517; SCH-900636) – androgen and glucocorticoid receptor antagonist – alcoholism
- Research programme: alcoholism therapeutics - ADial Pharmaceuticals – various actions – alcoholism
- Research programme: allosteric modulators - Addex Therapeutics – various actions – substance-related disorders
- Research programme: GPCR modulators - Nxera Pharma – various actions – cocaine-related disorders, substance-related disorders
- Research programme: nociceptin receptor agonists - Astraea Therapeutics – nociceptin receptor agonist, opioid receptor agonist – alcoholism, substance-related disorders
- Research programme: smoking cessation therapies - Ophidion – smoking withdrawal – nicotinic acetylcholine receptor agonists
- Research programme: tryptamine based therapeutics - PsyBio Therapeutics – serotonin 5-HT_{2A} receptor agonists – substance-related disorders
- RTI-598929 – μ-opioid receptor antagonist and κ-opioid receptor antagonist – heroin-related disorders
- Saracatinib (AZD-0530) – Src-family kinase inhibitor – alcoholism
- SBP-9330 – metabotropic glutamate mGlu_{2} receptor modulator – smoking withdrawal
- SEL-068 (tSVP; immunomodulatory nanoparticle vaccine for smoking cessation) – immunomodulator (smoking vaccine) – smoking withdrawal
- Serdexmethylphenidate (KP-484; KP-1077; KP-1077H; KP-1077IH; KP-1077N; KP-879) – norepinephrine–dopamine reuptake inhibitor (NDRI) (dexmethylphenidate prodrug) – substance-related disorders
- TRV-734 (TRV734) – μ-opioid receptor biased agonist – opioid-related disorders
- VDM-001 – opioid receptor antagonist – alcoholism, opioid-related disorders
- Zolunicant (18-methoxycoronaridine; 18-MC; MM-110) – α_{3}β_{4} nicotinic acetylcholine receptor antagonist – substance-related disorders

=== Suspended ===
- Dexmedetomidine (BXCL-501; Igalmi; KalmPen) – α_{2}-adrenergic receptor agonist – alcoholism
- Rocavorexant (C4X-3256; INDV-2000) – orexin OX_{1} receptor antagonist – opioid-related disorders
- Tetrodotoxin (9401-TTX; Halneuron; Tectin; Tetrodin; Tocudin) – voltage-gated sodium channel blocker

=== Discontinued ===
- ABT-436 – vasopressin V_{1b} receptor antagonist – alcoholism
- Adrogolide (ABT-431; DAS-431) – dopamine D_{1} receptor agonist – cocaine-related disorders
- ADX-629 – aldehyde inhibitor / reactive aldehyde species (RASP) inhibitor – alcoholism, alcoholic hepatitis
- ADX-10061 (CEE-310; CEE-03-310; NNC-010687; NNC-687) – dopamine D_{1} receptor antagonist – smoking withdrawal, substance-related disorders
- ADX-71441 – GABA_{B} receptor positive allosteric modulator – alcoholism, cocaine-related disorders, substance-related disorders
- Anatabine (RCP-006) – nicotinic acetylcholine receptor agonist – smoking withdrawal
- ANS-6637 (GS-6637; GS-6673) – aldehyde dehydrogenase 2 (ALDH2) inhibitor – alcoholism, opioid-related disorders, smoking withdrawal, substance-related disorders
- Arbaclofen placarbil (R-baclofen placarbil; XP-19986) – GABA_{B} receptor agonist – alcoholism
- ASP-8062 – GABA_{B} receptor modulator – opioid-related disorders
- Aticaprant (AVTX-501; CERC-501; JNJ-3964; JNJ-67953964; JNJ-67953964-AAA; LY-2456302) – κ-opioid receptor antagonist – alcoholism, cocaine-related disorders, smoking withdrawal
- Azasetron (nazasetron; Serotone; Y-25130) – serotonin 5-HT_{3} receptor antagonist – cocaine-related disorders
- AZD-4041 – orexin OX_{1} receptor antagonist – smoking withdrawal
- Baclofen/samidorphan (ALKS-29; ALKS-33/baclofen; baclofen/ALKS-33) – combination of baclofen (GABA_{B} receptor agonist) and samidorphan (μ-opioid receptor antagonist) – alcoholism
- Befloxatone (MD-370503) – monoamine oxidase A (MAO-A) inhibitor – smoking withdrawal
- BP-897 – dopamine D_{3} receptor agonist – cocaine-related disorders
- BR-9003 (BR-9003A) – undefined mechanism of action – smoking withdrawal
- BTRX-246040 (LY-2940094) – nociceptin receptor agonist – alcoholism
- Buprenorphine/naloxone (NanoBUP; NTC-0510; NTC-510) – combination of buprenorphine (non-selective opioid receptor modulator) and naloxone (orally/sublingually inactive opioid receptor antagonist) – opioid-related disorders
- Buprenorphine/samidorphan (ALKS 33-BUP; ALKS 33/buprenorphine; ALKS-5461; BUP-ALKS 33; buprenorphine/ALKS-33; buprenorphine/RDC 0313; RDC 0313/buprenorphine; samidorphan/buprenorphine) – combination of buprenorphine (non-selective opioid receptor modulator) and samidorphan (μ-opioid receptor antagonist) – cocaine-related disorders
- Cannabidiol (CBD; synthetic cannabidiol; RAD-011) – cannabinoid/various actions – substance-related disorders
- CVL-936 – dopamine D_{2} and D_{3} receptor antagonist – substance-related disorders
- CX-1739 – AMPA receptor positive allosteric modulator (ampakine) – substance-related disorders
- Deudimethyltryptamine (HLP004; HLP-004; CYB004; CYB-004; DMT-d10; deuterated dimethyltryptamine; dDMT) – non-selective serotonin receptor agonist, serotonin 5-HT_{2A} receptor agonist, and serotonergic psychedelic – substance-related disorders
- Deupsilocin (HLP003; HLP-003; CYB003; CYB-003; psilocin-d10; deuterated psilocin) – non-selective serotonin receptor agonist, serotonin 5-HT_{2A} receptor agonist, and serotonergic psychedelic – alcoholism
- Dianicline (SSR-591813) – nicotinic acetylcholine receptor agonist – smoking withdrawal
- Drinabant (AVE-1625; INDV-5004; OPNT-004) – cannabinoid CB_{1} receptor antagonist – substance-related disorders
- Ecopipam (EBS-101; PSYRX-101; SCH-39166) – dopamine D_{1} receptor antagonist – cocaine-related disorders
- Eglumetad (eglumegad; LY-354740) – metabotropic glutamate mGlu_{2} and mGlu_{3} receptor agonist – smoking withdrawal
- Elinzanetant (BAY-3427080; GSK-1144814A; GSK-1144814; Lynkuet; NT-814) – neurokinin NK_{1} and NK_{3} receptor antagonist – opioid-related disorders
- Femoxetine (femoxitine; FG-4963; Malexil; NNC-204963) – selective serotonin reuptake inhibitor (SSRI) – alcoholism
- Gabapentin enacarbil (ASP8825; Gabapentin-XP; GSK-1838262; Horizant; Regnite; Solzira; XP13512) – gabapentinoid (α_{2}δ subunit-containing voltage-gated calcium channel blocker) – alcoholism
- Gepirone (Ariza; BMY-13805; Exxua; MJ-13805; Org-33062; TGFK07AD; Travivo; Variza) – serotonin 5-HT_{1A} receptor agonist – cocaine-related disorders
- Istradefylline (KW-6002; Nourianz; Nouriast) – adenosine A_{2} receptor antagonist
- ITI-333 – serotonin 5-HT_{2A} receptor antagonist, dopamine D_{1} receptor antagonist, α_{1A}-adrenergic receptor antagonist, μ-opioid receptor partial agonist – substance-related disorders
- JNJ-39393406 – α_{7} subunit-containing nicotinic acetylcholine receptor positive allosteric modulator – smoking withdrawal
- JZP-150 – fatty acid amide hydrolase (FAAH) inhibitor – alcoholism
- Lisdexamfetamine (LDX; Elvanse; NRP-104; S-877489; SHP-489; SPD-489; Tyvense; Venvanse; Vyvanse) – norepinephrine–dopamine releasing agent (NDRA) – cocaine-related disorders
- Lorcaserin (APD-356; Belviq; E2023; Venespri) – serotonin 5-HT_{2C} receptor agonist – smoking withdrawal
- Manifaxine (BW-1555U88; GW-320659) – norepinephrine–dopamine reuptake inhibitor (NDRI) – smoking withdrawal
- Mavoglurant (AFQ-056; STP-7) – metabotropic glutamate mGlu_{5} receptor antagonist – smoking withdrawal
- Nalmefene (CPH-101; JF-1; Lu AA36143; Nalmetrene; NIH-10365; ORF-11676; Selincro; Soberal) – μ-opioid receptor antagonist, κ-opioid receptor weak partial agonist – smoking withdrawal
- Nepicastat oral (APL-1401; SYN-117) – dopamine β-hydroxylase (DBH) inhibitor – cocaine-related disorders
- Neramexane (KRP-209; MRZ-2/579) – NMDA receptor antagonist, nicotinic acetylcholine receptor antagonist – alcoholism
- NIC-002 (NIC002; CYT002-NicQβ; Nicotine-Qβ) – immunostimulant (nicotine vaccine) – smoking withdrawal
- NicVAX – immunostimulant (nicotine vaccine) – smoking withdrawal
- Nornicotine – nicotinic acetylcholine receptor agonist – smoking withdrawal
- NS-2359 (GSK-372475) – serotonin–norepinephrine–dopamine reuptake inhibitor (SNDRI) – alcoholism
- NYX-783 – ionotropic glutamate NMDA receptor modulator – alcoholism, opioid-related disorders
- OREX-1019 – μ-opioid receptor agonist, δ-opioid receptor antagonist, κ-opioid receptor antagonist, nociceptin receptor agonist – cocaine-related disorders
- OREX-1038 – μ-opioid receptor agonist – cocaine-related disorders, opioid-related disorders
- Oxytocin intranasal (Syntocinon Nasal Spray; TUR-001) – oxytocin receptor agonist – alcoholism
- Quetiapine (FK-949; FK949E; ICI-204636; Seroquel) – atypical antipsychotic (non-selective monoamine receptor modulator) – alcoholism
- Rimonabant (Acomplia; SR-141716; SR-141716A; Zimulti) – cannabinoid CB_{1} receptor antagonist – smoking withdrawal
- Risperidone (JNJ-410397-AAA; R-64766; R064766; Risperdal; Risperdal Consta; Risperdal Depot) – atypical antipsychotic (non-selective monoamine receptor modulator) – substance-related disorders
- RTI-113 – dopamine reuptake inhibitor (DRI) (cocaine analogue) – cocaine-related disorders
- Samidorphan (ALKS-33; RDC-0313; RDC-0313-00) – μ-opioid receptor antagonist – alcoholism, substance-related disorders
- Sembragiline (EVT-302; RG-1577; RO-4602522) – monoamine oxidase B (MAO-B) inhibitor – smoking withdrawal
- Serlopitant (JTS-661; MK-0594; VPD-737) – neurokinin NK_{1} receptor antagonist – alcoholism
- Surinabant (SR-147778; SR147778) – cannabinoid CB_{1} receptor antagonist – alcoholism, smoking withdrawal
- TA-NIC – immunostimulant (nicotine vaccine) – smoking withdrawal
- Tradipitant (LY-686017; Nereus; VLY-686) – neurokinin NK_{1} receptor antagonist – alcoholism
- Verucerfont (GSK-561679; NBI-77860) – corticotropin-releasing factor 1 (CRF_{1}) receptor antagonist
- Vigabatrin (γ-vinyl-GABA; gamma-vinyl-GABA; GVG; M071754; MDL-71754; RMI-71754; Sabril; Sabrilex) – GABA transaminase (GABA-T) inhibitor – cocaine-related disorders, substance-related disorders

== Other related drugs ==
- 5-Chloro-AMT (PAL-542) – serotonin–dopamine releasing agent (SDRA), serotonin receptor agonist, and monoamine oxidase A (MAO-A) inhibitor
- 5-Fluoro-AMT (PAL-212; PAL-544) – serotonin–norepinephrine–dopamine releasing agent (SNDRA), serotonin receptor agonist, and monoamine oxidase A (MAO-A) inhibitor
- CPI-CG-8 – serotonin 5-HT_{2C} receptor agonist
- Methocinnamox (MCAM) – long-lasting irreversible μ-opioid receptor antagonist
- Methoclocinnamox (MCCAM; NIH-10420) – long-lasting irreversible μ-opioid receptor partial agonist
- Oxa-noribogaine – atypical κ-opioid receptor agonist (noribogaine analogue)
- SR-17018 (SR17018; SR-17; SR17; SR) – μ-opioid receptor biased agonist

== Clinically used drugs ==
=== Approved drugs ===
==== Opioid receptor modulators ====
- Buprenorphine depot (Brixadi; Buvidal; CAM-2038; CAM-2048) – μ-opioid receptor agonist, δ-opioid receptor agonist, κ-opioid receptor antagonist, and nociceptin receptor agonist – opioid-related disorders
- Buprenorphine extended-release (Atrigel buprenorphine; BUP-XR-Indivior; depot buprenorphine; RBP-6000; Sublocade; Subutex prolonged release) – μ-opioid receptor agonist, δ-opioid receptor agonist, κ-opioid receptor antagonist, and nociceptin receptor agonist – opioid-related disorders
- Buprenorphine/naloxone sublingual (naloxone/buprenorphine; Sai Bo Song; SCH-000484; Suboxone) – combination of buprenorphine (non-selective opioid receptor modulator) and naloxone (orally/sublingually inactive opioid receptor antagonist) – opioid-related disorders
- Methadone (Zoryon) – μ-opioid receptor agonist – opioid-related disorders
- Nalmefene (Revex) – μ-opioid receptor antagonist, κ-opioid receptor weak partial agonist – opioid overdose, alcoholism
- Nalmefene (CPH-101; JF-1; Lu AA36143; nalmetrene; NIH-10365; ORF-11676; Selincro; Soberal) – μ-opioid receptor antagonist, κ-opioid receptor weak partial agonist – alcoholism
- Nalmefene nasal spray (intranasal nalmefene; Indivior; OPNT-003; Opvee) – μ-opioid receptor antagonist, κ-opioid receptor weak partial agonist – opioid-related disorders
- Nalorphine (Lethidrone, Nalline) – μ-opioid receptor antagonist, κ-opioid receptor agonist – opioid overdose
- Naloxone injection (Evzio; naloxone auto injector) – opioid receptor antagonist – opioid-related disorders
- Naloxone intranasal spray (Rezenopy) – μ-opioid receptor antagonist – opioid-related disorders
- Naloxone intranasal spray (Kloxxado; naloxone nasal spray) μ-opioid receptor antagonist – opioid-related disorders
- Naloxone multidose nasal spray (AP-003; Narcan) – μ-opioid receptor antagonist – opioid-related disorders
- Naloxone nasal spray (-12; LT-20; LT-21; LT-22; Naloxon B; Narcan Nasal Spray; OPNT-001) – μ-opioid receptor antagonist – opioid-related disorders
- Naltrexone controlled-release (Vivitrex; Vivitrol; XL-NTX; XR-NTX; ALKS-6428) – opioid receptor antagonist – alcoholism, opioid-related disorders
- Naltrexone oral (Nalorex; Nemexin; Revia) – opioid receptor antagonist – alcoholism, opioid-related disorders
- Other opioids (opioid agonist therapy) (e.g., dihydrocodeinone, extended-release morphine) – μ-opioid receptor agonists – opioid use disorder
- Tianeptine (Coaxil; Stablon; Tatinol) – μ-opioid receptor agonist, other actions – alcoholism

==== Nicotinic acetylcholine receptor modulators ====
- Bupropion (amfebutamone; Aplenzin; BVF-033; Elontril; Quomem; Wellbutrin; Zyban) – norepinephrine–dopamine reuptake inhibitor (NDRI), nicotinic acetylcholine receptor negative allosteric modulator – smoking withdrawal
- Cytisinicline (cytisine; Desmoxan; Tabex) – nicotinic acetylcholine receptor agonist – smoking withdrawal
- Varenicline (Champix; Chantix; CP-526,555; CP-526555-18) – nicotinic acetylcholine receptor agonist – smoking withdrawal

==== Other drugs ====
- Acamprosate (Alcomed; Aotal; calcium acetylhomotaurinate; Campral; Campral EC; NS-11; Regtect; Sobriol; Zulex) – various actions – alcoholism
- Baclofen (Baclocur) – GABA_{B} receptor agonist – alcoholism
- Calcium carbimide (Temposil) – aldehyde dehydrogenase 2 (ALDH2) inhibitor – alcoholism
- Cyanamide – aldehyde dehydrogenase 2 (ALDH2) inhibitor – alcoholism
- Disulfiram (Antabuse, Antabus) – aldehyde dehydrogenase 2 (ALDH2) inhibitor – alcoholism
- Flumazenil (flumazepil; Anexate) – GABA_{A} receptor negative allosteric modulator/benzodiazepine antidote – benzodiazepine overdose
- Lofexidine (BA-168; BritLofex; Lucemyra; MDL-14042; MDL-14042A; RMI-14042A) – α_{2}-adrenergic receptor agonist – opioid-related disorders
- Sodium oxybate (Alcover; SMO immediate release formulation) – GABA_{B} and GHB receptor agonist – alcoholism

=== Off-label drugs ===
- α_{2}-Adrenergic receptor agonists (e.g., clonidine, dexmedetomidine, guanfacine) – opioid withdrawal
- Benzodiazepines (e.g., diazepam) – GABA_{A} receptor positive allosteric modulators – alcohol withdrawal syndrome
- Gabapentinoids (e.g., gabapentin, pregabalin) – α_{2}δ subunit-containing voltage-gated calcium channel blockers – alcohol withdrawal syndrome
- Ibogaine (Tabernanthe iboga) – various actions, oneirogen/hallucinogen – opioid use disorder
- Lobeline – nicotinic acetylcholine receptor agonist – smoking withdrawal
- Mecamylamine – nicotinic acetylcholine receptor antagonist – smoking withdrawal
- Nicotine (nicotine replacement therapy; e.g., nicotine gum, nicotine inhaler, nicotine lozenge, nicotine nasal spray, nicotine patch) – nicotinic acetylcholine receptor agonist – smoking withdrawal
- Phenibut (Anvifen) – GABA_{B} receptor agonist and gabapentinoid (α_{2}δ subunit-containing voltage-gated calcium channel blocker) – alcoholism and alcohol withdrawal syndrome
- Serotonergic psychedelics (e.g., psilocybin, LSD, mescaline, DMT) – serotonin 5-HT_{2A} receptor agonists and psychedelic hallucinogens – various substance use disorders
- Topiramate (Topamax) – various actions – alcoholism and alcohol withdrawal syndrome

== See also ==
- List of investigational drugs
