= List of investigational other psychiatric disorder drugs =

Investigational other psychiatric disorder drugs

This is a list of investigational other psychiatric disorder drugs, or drugs that are currently under development for clinical use for the treatment of other or unspecified psychiatric disorders but are not yet approved. Some examples of such conditions include adjustment disorders, behavioral disorders, behavioral addictions like gambling addiction, impulse–control disorders, other personality disorders, and somatoform disorders.

Chemical/generic names are listed first, with developmental code names, synonyms, and brand names in parentheses. The format of list items is "Name (Synonyms) – Mechanism of Action – Indication [Reference]".

This list was last comprehensively updated in January 2026. It is likely to become outdated with time.

== Under development ==
=== Phase 3 ===
- Lumateperone (Caplyta; ITI-007; ITI-722) – non-selective monoamine receptor modulator – behavioral disorders
- Lurasidone (DSP-1349M; Latuda; SM-13496; SMP-13496) – atypical antipsychotic (non-selective monoamine receptor modulator) – psychiatric disorders
- Ralmitaront (NTX-2001; RG-7906; RO-6889450) – trace amine-associated receptor 1 (TAAR1) agonist – psychiatric disorders
- Venlafaxine extended-release (ALM-002; ALM002) – undefined mechanism of action – mental disorders

=== Phase 2/3 ===
- Evenamide (NW-3509; NW-3509A) – sodium channel blocker – psychiatric disorders
- Psilocybin (CYB001; CYB-001; INT0052/2020) – non-selective serotonin receptor agonist, serotonin 5-HT_{2A} receptor agonist, serotonergic psychedelic – mental disorders

=== Phase 2 ===
- ALM-007 (ALM007) – undefined mechanism of action – psychiatric disorders
- Deudextromethorphan (AVP-786; CTP-786; d-DM; deuterated-DM; deuDXM; deu-DXM; deuterated DXM) – NMDA receptor antagonist, sigma receptor agonist, other actions – impulse–control disorders
- Fasedienol (Aloradine; AM-005; PH-94B; PH94B) – vomeropherine (chemoreceptor cell modulator) – adjustment disorders
- Psilocybin (COMP360; COMP-360) – non-selective serotonin receptor agonist, serotonin 5-HT_{2A} receptor agonist, serotonergic psychedelic – somatoform disorders
- Psilocybin (PEX-010) – non-selective serotonin receptor agonist, serotonin 5-HT_{2A} receptor agonist, serotonergic psychedelic – adjustment disorders
- SRX-246 (SRX246; API-246) – vasopressin V_{1A} receptor antagonist – impulse–control disorders
- SXC-2023 – cystine–glutamate antiporter (SLC7A11; System x_{c-} or Sxc) activator – impulse–control disorders

=== Phase 1/2 ===
- SRX-246 (SRX246; API-246) – vasopressin V_{1A} receptor antagonist – behavioral disorders

=== Phase 1 ===
- 5-MeO-MiPT (MSD-001; MS001; MSD-101; MSD-201; MSD-X01) – non-selective serotonin receptor agonist, serotonin 5-HT_{2A} receptor agonist, serotonergic psychedelic – mental disorders
- CVN-766 (CVN766) – orexin OX_{1} receptor antagonist – psychiatric disorders
- "Glutamate receptor modulator" - Boehringer Ingelheim – glutamate receptor modulator – mental disorders
- KNX-100 (KNX100; SOC-1) – oxytocin-like drug / indirect oxytocin receptor modulator – behavioral disorders
- MSP-2020 (MSP2020) – serotonin 5-HT_{2A} receptor agonist – mental disorders
- NBI-1140675 – vesicular monoamine transporter 2 (VMAT2) inhibitor – psychiatric disorders
- Radiprodil (RGH-896) – ionotropic glutamate NR2B-containing NMDA receptor antagonist – behavioral disorders
- "Receptor agonist" - Boehringer Ingelheim – undefined mechanism of action – mental disorders
- SYT-510 (SYT510) – endocannabinoid reuptake inhibitor – psychiatric disorders

=== Clinical phase unknown ===
- Eplivanserin/volinanserin – fixed-dose combination of eplivanserin (serotonin 5-HT_{2A} receptor antagonist) and volinanserin (serotonin 5-HT_{2A} receptor antagonist) – psychiatric disorders

=== Preclinical ===
- Aripiprazole controlled release (LYN-006; ultra long-acting aripiprazole) – atypical antipsychotic (non-selective monoamine receptor modulator) – psychiatric disorders
- CYB-210010 (CYB210010; 2C-T-TFM; 2C-T-36) – serotonin 5-HT_{2} receptor agonist and serotonergic psychedelic – psychiatric disorders
- Dexmedetomidine (BXCL-501; Igalmi; KalmPen) – α_{2}-adrenergic receptor agonist – psychiatric disorders
- DT-201 (DT201) – α_{5} subunit-containing GABA_{A} receptor negative allosteric modulator – psychiatric disorders
- KAR-501 (KAR501) – undefined mechanism of action – mental disorders
- Lu AG06474 (Lu-AG-06474) – monoacylglycerol lipase (MAGL) inhibitor – psychiatric disorders
- Metyrapone/oxazepam (EMB-001C; EMB-001) – combination of metyrapone (11β-hydroxylase inhibitor and cortisol synthesis inhibitor) and oxazepam (benzodiazepine/GABA_{A} receptor positive allosteric modulator) – gambling
- NBI-1065890 (NBI-890) – vesicular monoamine transporter 2 (VMAT2) inhibitor – psychiatric disorders
- ORX-489 (ORX489) – orexin OX_{2} receptor antagonist – psychiatric disorders
- OV-350 (AZ-8333) – potassium–chloride-cotransporter agonist – psychiatric disorders
- TPT-0301 (neuropathic pain therapeutic) – cannabinoid receptor modulator – mental disorders

=== Research ===
- OWP-107 (OWP107) – undefined mechanism of action – psychiatric disorders
- Psilocybin (REL-P11) – non-selective serotonin receptor agonist, serotonin 5-HT_{2A} receptor agonist, serotonergic psychedelic – psychiatric disorders
- Research programme: mental disorder therapies - Mindstate Design Labs (MSD-X02) – undefined mechanism of action – mental disorders

== Not under development ==
=== No development reported ===
- 4-Chlorokynurenine (4-CL-KYN; 7-CL-KYNA; AV-101; L-4-chlorokynurenine; L-4-CL-KYN) – NMDA receptor antagonist, kynurenine modulator – psychiatric disorders
- Acetaminophen/naltrexone (paracetamol/naltrexone; ALLOD-2; ALLOD-2H; ATNC-05) – combination of acetaminophen (analgesic) and naltrexone (opioid receptor antagonist/immunomodulator) – adjustment disorders
- Deudextromethorphan (AVP-786; CTP-786; d-DM; deuterated-DM; deuDXM; deu-DXM; deuterated DXM) – NMDA receptor antagonist, sigma receptor agonist, other actions – psychiatric disorders
- Deulumateperone (ITI-1284; ITI-1284 ODT-SL) – non-selective monoamine receptor modulator – behavioral disorders
- Ecopipam (EBS-101; PSYRX-101; SCH-39166) – dopamine D_{1} receptor antagonist – gambling
- Ketamine (AWKN-001; AWKN-P-001) – ionotropic glutamate NMDA receptor antagonist, dissociative hallucinogen – gambling, impulse–control disorders
- LB-100 (LB100; LB-1) – protein phosphatase 2A (PP2A) inhibitor – behavioral disorders
- Lu-AF95245 – potassium channel agonist – mental disorders
- Midomafetamine (MDMA; ecstasy; MDMA-CUREfilm) – serotonin–norepinephrine–dopamine releasing agent, weak serotonin 5-HT_{2} receptor agonist, entactogen – mental disorders
- Olanzapine (BR-5402; LY-170053; LY-170052; Midax; Zypadhera; Zyprexa) – atypical antipsychotic (non-selective monoamine receptor modulator) – personality disorders
- OMS-527 (OMS527; OMS-182399) – phosphodiesterase PDE7 inhibitor – impulse–control disorders
- Opipramol (Ensidon; G-33040; Insidon; Nisidana; OPIprol) – sigma receptor agonist, atypical tricyclic antidepressant (TCA) – somatoform disorders
- Pimavanserin (ACP-103; BVF-048; Nuplazid) – serotonin 5-HT_{2A} receptor antagonist – psychiatric disorders
- Pirepemat (IRL-752) – various actions – behavioral disorders
- PT-00114 (PT00114) – corticotropin-releasing hormone (CRH) inhibitor – impulse–control disorders
- Research programme: behavioural disorder therapeutics - Evotec SE/Neumora Therapeutics – undefined mechanism of action – behavioral disorders
- Research programme: GPR151 modulating therapeutics - Omeros Corporation – GPR151 modulators – mental disorders
- Research programme: neuropsychiatric disorder therapies - Roche/PsychoGenics – undefined mechanism of action – psychiatric disorders
- Research programme: small molecule therapeutics - Evotec/Pasithea Therapeutics – undefined mechanism of action – mental disorders
- Risperidone (QR-106) – atypical antipsychotic (non-selective monoamine receptor modulator) – psychiatric disorders
- SKL-15508 (SKL-A4R; SKL15508) – α_{7} subunit-containing nicotinic acetylcholine receptor partial agonist – mental disorders

=== Suspended ===
- BIA-102474 (BIA-10; BIA 10–2474) – fatty acid amide hydrolase (FAAH) inhibitor – psychiatric disorders

=== Discontinued ===
- ADX-71149 (ADX71149; JNJ-1813; JNJ-40411813; JNJ-mGluR2-PAM) – metabotropic glutamate mGlu_{2} receptor positive allosteric modulator – psychiatric disorders
- ALTO-203 (ALTO203) – histamine H_{3} receptor antagonist – psychiatric disorders
- CORT-108297 (ADS-108297) – glucocorticoid receptor antagonist – psychiatric disorders
- Davalintide (AC-2307; second-generation amylinomimetic) – amylin receptor agonist – psychiatric disorders
- Deudimethyltryptamine (HLP004; HLP-004; CYB004; CYB-004; DMT-d10; deuterated dimethyltryptamine; deuterated DMT; dDMT) – non-selective serotonin receptor agonist, serotonin 5-HT_{2A} receptor agonist, serotonergic psychedelic – psychiatric disorders
- Deupsilocin (CYB003; CYB-003; HLP-003; HLP003; deuterated psilocin; psilocin-d10) – non-selective serotonin receptor agonist, serotonin 5-HT_{2A} receptor agonist, serotonergic psychedelic – psychiatric disorders
- Nalmefene oral (CPH-101; JF-1; Lu AA36143; nalmetrene; NIH-10365; ORF-11676; Selincro; Soberal) – μ-opioid receptor antagonist, κ-opioid receptor weak partial agonist – gambling
- Pimavanserin (ACP-103; BVF-048; Nuplazid) – serotonin 5-HT_{2A} receptor antagonist – behavioral disorders
- Quetiapine (FK-949; FK949E; ICI-204636; Seroquel) – non-selective monoamine receptor modulator – behavioral disorders
- TAK-137 (TAK137) – AMPA receptor positive allosteric modulator – psychiatric disorders
- Tasipimidine (ODM-105) – α_{2A}-adrenergic receptor modulators – psychiatric disorders
- Zabaglurant (TMP-301; TMP301; Heptares 25; HTL-0014242; HTL14242) – metabotropic glutamate mGlu_{5} receptor antagonist – psychiatric disorders

== Clinically used drugs ==
=== Market withdrawal ===
- Mesocarb (armesocarb; MLR-1019) – atypical dopamine reuptake inhibitor (DRI) – psychiatric disorders

== See also ==
- Lists of investigational drugs
