= Rocavorexant =

Clinical data
- Other names: C4X-3256; C4X3256; INDV-2000; INDV2000
- Routes of administration: Oral
- Drug class: Orexin OX_{1} receptor antagonist

Identifiers
- IUPAC name: N,6-dimethyl-3-(triazol-2-yl)-N-[(2S)-1-[[5-(trifluoromethyl)pyrazin-2-yl]amino]propan-2-yl]pyridine-2-carboxamide
- CAS Number: 2115665-09-1
- PubChem CID: 130295635
- ChemSpider: 133325612
- UNII: 8RJN30TJM6
- KEGG: D13324

Chemical and physical data
- Formula: C_{18}H_{19}F_{3}N_{8}O
- Molar mass: 420.400 g·mol^{−1}
- 3D model (JSmol): Interactive image
- SMILES: CC1=NC(=C(C=C1)N2N=CC=N2)C(=O)N(C)[C@@H](C)CNC3=NC=C(N=C3)C(F)(F)F
- InChI: InChI=1S/C18H19F3N8O/c1-11-4-5-13(29-25-6-7-26-29)16(27-11)17(30)28(3)12(2)8-23-15-10-22-14(9-24-15)18(19,20)21/h4-7,9-10,12H,8H2,1-3H3,(H,23,24)/t12-/m0/s1; Key:KYPYNXQQCRWPBB-LBPRGKRZSA-N

Rocavorexant (INN; developmental code names C4X-3256 and INDV-2000) is an orexin OX_{1} receptor antagonist which is under development for the treatment of opioid-related disorders and other substance-related disorders. It is taken orally. The drug is under development by C4X Discovery and/or Indivior. As of May 2026, development for all indications has been suspended. The drug has reached phase 2 clinical trials for opioid-related disorders and phase 1 trials for substance-related disorders.

== See also ==
- List of investigational substance-related disorder drugs
