= Devextinetug =

Clinical data
- Other names: IXT-m200; Ch-mAb7F9; METH-mAb; Anti-methamphetamine chimeric monoclonal antibody; Anti-methamphetamine monoclonal antibody
- Routes of administration: Intravenous injection
- Drug class: Monoclonal antibody

Identifiers
- CAS Number: 2609642-90-0
- PubChem SID: 474492328
- UNII: BT3RCH0595

Devextinetug (INN, USAN; developmental code name IXT-m200) is a monoclonal antibody against methamphetamine which is under development for the treatment of substance-related disorders including methamphetamine overdose. It is taken by intravenous injection. The drug has been found to reduce the toxicity of methamphetamine in overdose, for instance reducing agitation and need for sedation. Devextinetug is under development by InterveXion Therapeutics. As of May 2024, it is in phase 2 clinical trials for substance-related disorders.

== See also ==
- List of investigational substance-related disorder drugs
