= INDV-1000 =

Clinical data
- Other names: INDV1000
- Routes of administration: Unspecified
- Drug class: GABA_{B} receptor positive allosteric modulator

INDV-1000 is a GABA_{B} receptor positive allosteric modulator (PAM) which is under development for the treatment of substance-related disorders. Its route of administration is unspecified. The drug is under development by Indivior in partnership with Addex Therapeutics. As of April 2024, it is in the preclinical research stage of development. The chemical structure of INDV-1000 does not yet appear to have been disclosed. It is one of a limited number of known GABA_{B} receptor PAMs as of 2024.

== See also ==
- GABA_{B} receptor § Positive allosteric modulators
- List of investigational substance-related disorder drugs
