= Metyrapone/oxazepam =

Combination of
- Metyrapone: 11β-Hydroxylase inhibitor
- Oxazepam: Benzodiazepine (GABA_{A} receptor positive allosteric modulator

Clinical data
- Other names: EMB-001; EMB001; EMB-001C; EMB001C
- Routes of administration: Oral

Metyrapone/oxazepam (developmental code name EMB-001) is a combination of metyrapone, an 11β-hydroxylase inhibitor (and cortisol synthesis inhibitor), and oxazepam, a benzodiazepine and GABA_{A} receptor positive allosteric modulator, which is under development for the treatment of smoking withdrawal, cocaine-related disorders, eating disorders, gambling, post-traumatic stress disorder (PTSD), and other substance-related disorders. It is taken orally.

The drug aims to attenuate the enhancing effects of stress on drug-seeking behavior. It was originally theorized to work by reducing corticosteroid levels (corticosterone in rodents and cortisol in humans), but it might actually work by increasing brain levels of certain neurosteroids, most notably the corticosterone-derived tetrahydrodeoxycorticosterone (THDOC).

EMB-001 is under development by Embera NeuroTherapeutics. As of July 2024, it is in phase 2/3 clinical trials for smoking withdrawal, phase 2 trials for cocaine-related disorders, and the preclinical research stage of development for all other indications.

== See also ==
- List of investigational substance-related disorder drugs
- List of investigational eating disorder drugs
- List of investigational other psychiatric disorder drugs
- List of investigational post-traumatic stress disorder drugs
