= Pudafensine =

Clinical data
- Other names: IP2015; IP-2015; IPED2015; IPED-2015; IP2017; IP-2017; IPNP2015; IPNP-2015; IPTN2021; IPTN-2021
- Routes of administration: Oral
- Drug class: Serotonin–norepinephrine–dopamine reuptake inhibitor (SNDRI)

Identifiers
- IUPAC name: 7-[[(1S,5R)-8-azabicyclo[3.2.1]octan-3-yl]oxy]-3-methoxychromen-2-one
- CAS Number: 1320346-14-2
- PubChem CID: 53308741
- ChemSpider: 129956506
- UNII: L9NG7US8GE
- ChEMBL: ChEMBL6068030

Chemical and physical data
- Formula: C_{17}H_{19}NO_{4}
- Molar mass: 301.342 g·mol^{−1}
- 3D model (JSmol): Interactive image
- SMILES: COC1=CC2=C(C=C(C=C2)OC3C[C@H]4CC[C@@H](C3)N4)OC1=O
- InChI: InChI=1S/C17H19NO4/c1-20-16-6-10-2-5-13(9-15(10)22-17(16)19)21-14-7-11-3-4-12(8-14)18-11/h2,5-6,9,11-12,14,18H,3-4,7-8H2,1H3/t11-,12+,14?; Key:JCRMWMMEWIZRMN-ONXXMXGDSA-N

Pudafensine (INN; developmental code name IP2015 among others) is a serotonin–norepinephrine–dopamine reuptake inhibitor (SNDRI) which is under development for the treatment of erectile dysfunction, neuropathic pain, trigeminal neuralgia, vulvodynia, female sexual dysfunction, pain, and substance-related disorders. It is taken orally. The drug has been found to induce penile erection in male rodents and to increase genital blood flow and paracopulatory behaviors in female rodents. A close analogue of pudafensine is the earlier SNDRI NS18283. Pudafensine is under development by Initiator Pharma. As of July 2025, it is in phase 2 clinical trials for erectile dysfunction, phase 1 trials for neuropathic pain, trigeminal neuralgia, and vulvodynia, and the preclinical research stage of development for female sexual dysfunction, pain, and substance-related disorders.

== Chemistry ==
=== Synthesis ===
The chemical synthesis of pudafensine was disclosed: Precursor:

The reaction of endo-Tropacocaine [19145-60-9] (1) with 2,2,2-Trichloroethyl chloroformate (Troc group) [17341-93-4] (2) gave the urethane PC11463908 (3). Reduction with zinc in acetic acid afforded the nortropane, PC11458897 (4). Protection of the secondary amine with Boc anhydride gave PC66624775 (5). Saponification of the ester in potassium hydroxide gave PC11160507 (6). Mitsunobu reaction with 7-hydroxy-3-methoxy-chromen-2-one (Methoxy-Umbelliferon) [68287-05-8] (7) occurred with inversion of stereochemistry from the endo to the exo position, PC89405050 (8). Acid hydrolysis of the Boc protecting group completed the synthesis of pudafensine (9).

== See also ==
- List of investigational sexual dysfunction drugs
- List of investigational analgesics
- List of investigational substance-related disorder drugs
