= Cyproheptadine/prazosin =

- Cyproheptadine

- Prazosin

Combination of
- Cyproheptadine: Serotonin 5-HT_{2} receptor antagonist, other actions
- Prazosin: α_{1}-Adrenergic receptor antagonist

Clinical data
- Other names: Periactin/Alpress; KT-110; KT110
- Routes of administration: Unspecified

Cyproheptadine/prazosin, also known by its developmental code name KT-110, is a combination of cyproheptadine, an antihistamine and serotonin 5-HT_{2} receptor antagonist among other actions, and prazosin, an α_{1}-adrenergic receptor antagonist, which is under development for the treatment of alcoholism, cocaine-related disorders, post-traumatic stress disorder (PTSD), and substance-related disorders. Its route of administration is unspecified.

The drug is thought to work for treatment of drug addiction via simultaneous blockade of the serotonin 5-HT_{2A} receptor and the α_{1B}-adrenergic receptor, which is thought to strongly reduce dopamine elevations and associated effects like behavioral sensitization in response to drugs of misuse like stimulants, opioids, and alcohol. Whereas cyproheptadine or prazosin alone had no effect on alcohol preference in rodents, the combination of cyproheptadine and prazosin reduced alcohol preference.

Cyproheptadine/prazosin was originated by Greenpharma SAS and Key-Obs and is under development by Kinnov Therapeutics. As of March 2025, it is in phase 2 clinical trials for alcoholism and the preclinical research stage of development for cocaine-related disorders and PTSD, whereas no recent development has been reported for substance-related disorders (reached preclinical).

== See also ==
- List of investigational substance-related disorder drugs
- List of investigational post-traumatic stress disorder drugs
- Ketanserin and trazodone
