= Nezavist =

Clinical data
- Other names: DCUK-OEt; DCUKA ethyl ester; DCUK ethyl carboxylate
- Routes of administration: Oral
- Drug class: Peripherally selective GABA_{A} receptor positive allosteric modulator

Identifiers
- IUPAC name: ethyl 5,7-dichloro-4-(diphenylcarbamoylamino)quinoline-2-carboxylate
- CAS Number: 210692-57-2
- PubChem CID: 15872008
- ChemSpider: 13081967
- UNII: 87RNZ9E6L6

Chemical and physical data
- Formula: C_{25}H_{19}Cl_{2}N_{3}O_{3}
- Molar mass: 480.35 g·mol^{−1}
- 3D model (JSmol): Interactive image
- SMILES: CCOC(=O)C1=NC2=C(C(=C1)NC(=O)N(C3=CC=CC=C3)C4=CC=CC=C4)C(=CC(=C2)Cl)Cl
- InChI: InChI=1S/C25H19Cl2N3O3/c1-2-33-24(31)22-15-21(23-19(27)13-16(26)14-20(23)28-22)29-25(32)30(17-9-5-3-6-10-17)18-11-7-4-8-12-18/h3-15H,2H2,1H3,(H,28,29,32); Key:UHTVXLVKFPJKMP-UHFFFAOYSA-N

Nezavist, also known as DCUK-OEt, is a peripherally selective GABA_{A} receptor positive allosteric modulator which is under development for the treatment of alcoholism and depressive disorders. It is taken orally. The drug is a positive allosteric modulator (PAM) specifically of the etomidate allosteric site of the GABA_{A} receptor. As it does not cross the blood–brain barrier, Nezavist is peripherally selective and does not directly produce central nervous system effects. Nonetheless, the drug has been found to reduce alcohol self-administration in rodents, perhaps via intestinal stimulation of the vagus nerve. Nezavist is under development by Lohocla Research. As of October 2025, it is in phase 1 clinical trials for alcoholism and the preclinical research stage of development for depressive disorders.

== See also ==
- List of investigational substance-related disorder drugs
- List of investigational antidepressants
