= Brenipatide =

Clinical data
- Other names: LY-3537031; LY3537031
- Routes of administration: Subcutaneous injection
- Drug class: GLP-1 receptor agonist; GIP receptor agonist

Identifiers
- IUPAC name: D-Tyrosyl-2-methylalanyl-L-α-glutamylglycyl-L-threonyl-L-phenylalanyl-L-threonyl-L-seryl-L-α-aspartyl-L-tyrosyl-L-seryl-L-isoleucyl-2-methyl-L-leucyl-L-leucyl-L-α-aspartyl-L-lysyl-N6-[N-(19-carboxy-1-oxononadecyl) -L-γ-glutamyl-2-[2-(2-aminoethoxy)ethoxy]acetyl-2-[2-(2-aminoethoxy)ethoxy]acetyl] -L-lysyl-L-alanyl-L-glutaminyl-2-methylalanyl-L-α-glutamyl-L-phenylalanyl-L-isoleucyl-L-α-glutamyl-α-methyl-L-tyrosyl-L-leucyl-L-isoleucyl-L-alanylglycylglycyl-L-prolyl-L-seryl-L-serylglycyl-L-alanyl-L-prolyl-L-prolyl-L-prolyl-L-serinamide
- CAS Number: 2408921-49-1
- PubChem SID: 518139661
- UNII: C3939LZT6J

Chemical and physical data
- Formula: C_{228}H_{354}N_{46}O_{72}
- Molar mass: 4891.590 g·mol^{−1}

Brenipatide (INN, USAN; developmental code name LY-3537031) is a dual agonist of glucagon-like peptide-1 (GLP-1) receptors and gastric inhibitory polypeptide (GIP) receptors.

Brenipatide is under development by Eli Lilly and Company for the treatment of alcoholism, bipolar disorder, asthma, smoking withdrawal, cardiovascular disorders, liver disorders, metabolic disorders, and obesity.

It is taken by subcutaneous injection once per month. The drug has a longer elimination half-life than tirzepatide or retatrutide.

As of December 2025, it was in phase 3 clinical trials for alcoholism and bipolar disorder, phase 2 trials for asthma and smoking withdrawal, and phase 1 trials for cardiovascular disorders, liver disorders, metabolic disorders, and obesity.

== See also ==
- List of investigational antipsychotics
- List of investigational bipolar disorder drugs
- List of investigational substance-related disorder drugs
