= Cyproheptadine =

Antihistamine medication

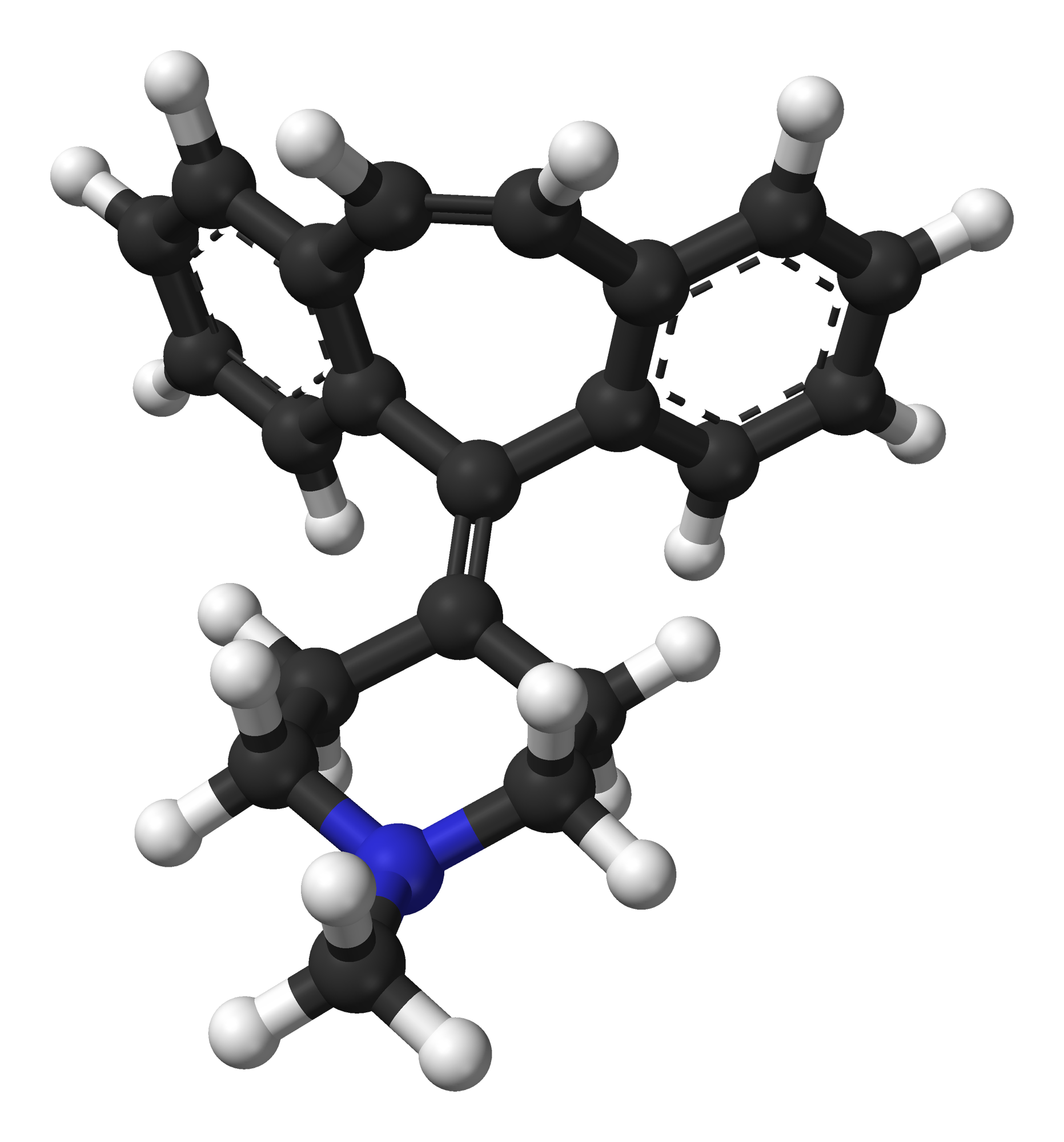

Clinical data
- Pronunciation: /ˌsaɪproʊˈhɛptədiːn/
- Trade names: Periactin, others
- AHFS/Drugs.com: Monograph
- MedlinePlus: a682541
- License data: US DailyMed: Cyproheptadine
- Pregnancy category: AU: A
- Routes of administration: Oral
- Drug class: First-generation antihistamine; Serotonin receptor antagonist; Antidopaminergic; Appetite stimulant
- ATC code: R06AX02 (WHO)

Legal status
- Legal status: AU: S3 (Pharmacist only); CA: OTC; UK: General sales list (GSL, OTC); US: ℞-only; In general: Over-the-counter (OTC)

Pharmacokinetic data
- Protein binding: 96–99%
- Metabolism: Liver, including glucuronidation
- Onset of action: 1–4 hours (peak)
- Elimination half-life: 8.6 hours
- Excretion: Faecal (2–20%; of which, 34% as unchanged drug) and renal (40%; none as unchanged drug)

Identifiers
- IUPAC name: 4-(5H-Dibenzo[a,d]cyclohepten-5-ylidene)-1-methylpiperidine
- CAS Number: 129-03-3 969-33-5 (hydrochloride)
- PubChem CID: 2913
- IUPHAR/BPS: 277
- DrugBank: DB00434
- ChemSpider: 2810
- UNII: 2YHB6175DO
- KEGG: D07765
- ChEBI: CHEBI:4046
- ChEMBL: ChEMBL516
- CompTox Dashboard (EPA): DTXSID8022872
- ECHA InfoCard: 100.004.482

Chemical and physical data
- Formula: C_{21}H_{21}N
- Molar mass: 287.406 g·mol^{−1}
- 3D model (JSmol): Interactive image
- SMILES: c43\C(=C1/CCN(C)CC1)c2ccccc2\C=C/c3cccc4
- InChI: InChI=1S/C21H21N/c1-22-14-12-18(13-15-22)21-19-8-4-2-6-16(19)10-11-17-7-3-5-9-20(17)21/h2-11H,12-15H2,1H3; Key:JJCFRYNCJDLXIK-UHFFFAOYSA-N

Cyproheptadine, sold under the brand name Periactin among others, is a first-generation antihistamine which is used to treat allergies. In addition, it has a number of off-label uses, such as treatment of serotonin syndrome, insomnia, and use as an appetite stimulant. The drug is taken orally.

It is an antihistamine and hence acts as a histamine H_{1} receptor antagonist. In addition to its antihistamine activity, cyproheptadine has anticholinergic, antiserotonergic, antidopaminergic, and local anesthetic properties. These activities make cyproheptadine useful for various additional uses besides antihistamine indications. As a first-generation antihistamine, cyproheptadine crosses the blood–brain barrier and can produce sedation. The drug can also produce significant central anticholinergic effects at clinically used doses.

Cyproheptadine was patented in 1959 and came into medical use in 1961. In 2023, it was the 234th most commonly prescribed medication in the United States, with more than 1 million prescriptions.

== Medical uses ==
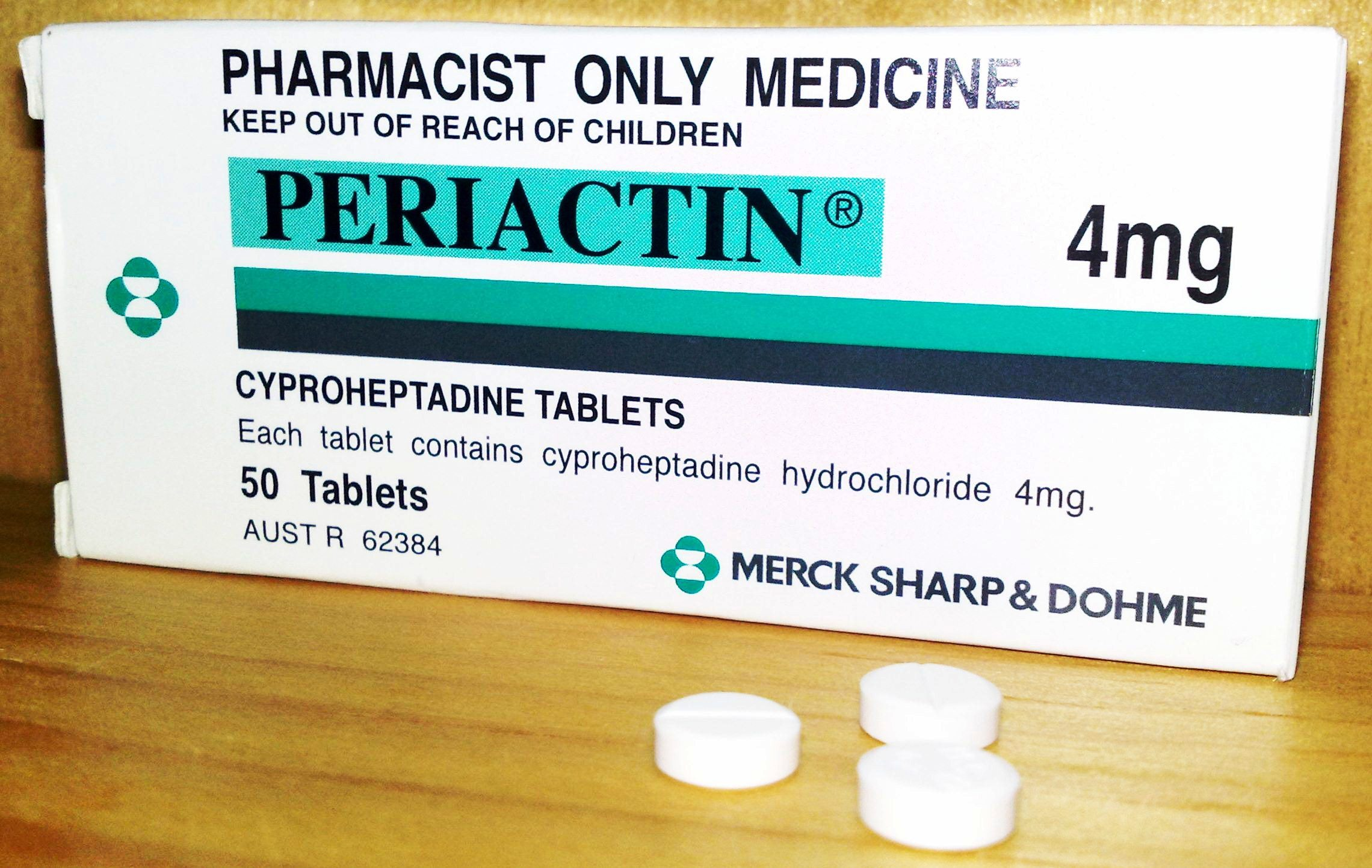
Periactin (cyproheptadine) 4 mg tablets

Cyproheptadine is used to treat allergic reactions (specifically hay fever). There is evidence supporting its use for allergies, but second generation antihistamines such as ketotifen and loratadine have shown equal results with fewer side effects.

It is also used as a preventive treatment against migraine. In a 2013 study the frequency of migraine was dramatically reduced in patients within 7 to 10 days after starting treatment. The average frequency of migraine attacks in these patients before administration was 8.7 times per month, this was decreased to 3.1 times per month at 3 months after the start of treatment. This use is on the label in the UK and some other countries.

It is also used off-label in the treatment of cyclic vomiting syndrome in infants; the only evidence for this use comes from retrospective studies.

Cyproheptadine is sometimes used off-label to improve akathisia in people on antipsychotic medications.

It is used off-label to treat various dermatological conditions, including psychogenic itch, drug-induced hyperhidrosis (excessive sweating), and prevention of blister formation for some people with epidermolysis bullosa simplex.

One of the effects of the drug is increased appetite and weight gain, which has led to its use (off-label in the USA) for this purpose in children who are wasting as well as people with cystic fibrosis.

It is also used off-label in the management of moderate to severe cases of serotonin syndrome, a complex of symptoms associated with the use of serotonergic drugs, such as selective serotonin reuptake inhibitors (and monoamine oxidase inhibitors), and in cases of high levels of serotonin in the blood resulting from a serotonin-producing carcinoid tumor. There is uncertainty about the proper dose of cyproheptadine for treatment of serotonin syndrome, with doses of 4 to 16 mg having been employed but doses of 20 to 30 mg possibly actually being necessary based on positron emission tomography (PET) imaging research.

Cyproheptadine has sedative effects and can be used to treat insomnia similarly to other centrally-acting antihistamines. The recommended dose for this use is 4 to 8 mg.

== Contraindications ==
Contraindications of cyproheptadine include newborns and premature infants, nursing mothers, hypersensitivity to cyproheptadine and its ingredients, monoamine oxidase inhibitors (MAOIs), angle-closure glaucoma, stenosing peptic ulcer symptomatic prostatic hypertrophy, bladder neck obstruction, pyloroduodenal obstruction, and elderly, debilitated patients.

== Adverse effects ==
Adverse effects include:

- Sedation and sleepiness (often transient)
- Dizziness
- Disturbed coordination
- Confusion
- Restlessness
- Excitation
- Nervousness
- Tremor
- Irritability
- Insomnia
- Paresthesias
- Neuritis
- Convulsions
- Euphoria
- Hallucinations
- Hysteria
- Faintness
- Allergic manifestation of rash and edema
- Diaphoresis
- Urticaria
- Photosensitivity
- Acute labyrinthitis
- Diplopia (seeing double)
- Vertigo
- Tinnitus
- Hypotension (low blood pressure)
- Palpitation
- Extrasystoles
- Anaphylactic shock
- Hemolytic anemia
- Blood dyscrasias such as leukopenia, agranulocytosis and thrombocytopenia
- Cholestasis
- Hepatic (liver) side effects such as:
  - Hepatitis
  - Jaundice
  - Liver failure
  - Hepatic function abnormality
- Epigastric distress
- Anorexia
- Nausea
- Vomiting
- Diarrhea
- Anticholinergic side effects such as:
  - Blurred vision
  - Constipation
  - Xerostomia (dry mouth)
  - Tachycardia (high heart rate)
  - Urinary retention
  - Difficulty passing urine
  - Nasal congestion
  - Nasal or throat dryness
- Urinary frequency
- Early menses
- Thickening of bronchial secretions
- Tightness of chest and wheezing
- Fatigue
- Chills
- Headache
- Increased appetite
- Weight gain

== Overdose ==
Gastric decontamination measures such as activated charcoal are sometimes recommended in cases of overdose. The symptoms are usually indicative of CNS depression (or conversely CNS stimulation in some) and excess anticholinergic side effects. The LD_{50} in mice is 123 mg/kg and 295 mg/kg in rats.

== Interactions ==
Sedating antihistamines like cyproheptadine may have additive effects with other CNS depressants like such as alcohol, hypnotics, sedatives, tranquilizers, and anxiolytics. Monoamine oxidase inhibitors (MAOIs) may prolong and intensify the anticholinergic effects of antihistamines like cyproheptadine. However, cyproheptadine is safe to use in the treatment of serotonin syndrome occurring with MAOIs.

Cyproheptadine, due to its serotonin 5-HT_{2A} receptor antagonism, may be useful as a hallucinogen antidote against serotonergic psychedelics or as a so-called "trip killer". The drug has been clinically studied in combination with the serotonergic psychedelic dimethyltryptamine (DMT). In an early study, cyproheptadine partially blocked the hallucinogenic effects of DMT in 2 of 3 subjects. In a follow-up study, pretreatment with cyproheptadine in 5 subjects failed to reduce the psychoactive effects of DMT and instead was found to actually intensify its effects in some cases, although the duration of DMT seemed to be shortened. Subsequently, Rick Strassman and colleagues studied cyproheptadine in combination with DMT in 8 subjects and found that the hallucinogenic effects of DMT were not magnified but were reduced. However, owing to the pronounced sedative effects of cyproheptadine, it was difficult to tell how much of cyproheptadine's effect was due to antagonism of DMT versus simple general tranquilization. Overall, the findings have been described as inconclusive and higher doses of cyproheptadine being precluded by the drug's sedative effects. It is unclear that cyproheptadine achieves adequate serotonin 5-HT_{2A} receptor occupancy at the assessed doses. Further complicating the picture, high doses of cyproheptadine have been reported to produce partial LSD-like discriminative stimulus effects in animals.

== Pharmacology ==
=== Pharmacodynamics ===
Activities of cyproheptadine
Site	K_{i} (nM)	Action
5-HT_{1A}	50–59	↓
5-HT_{1B}	1,600	?
5-HT_{1D}	670	?
5-HT_{1E}	1,500	?
5-HT_{2A}	0.46–3.0	↓
5-HT_{2B}	1.5–2.6	↓
5-HT_{2C}	2.2–18	↓
5-HT_{3}	235	?
5-HT_{4}	ND	?
5-HT_{5A}	57	?
5-HT_{6}	96–150	?
5-HT_{7}	30–126	?
D_{1}	10–117	?
D_{2}	74–112	↓
D_{3}	8	?
D_{4}	120	?
D_{5}	60	?
α_{1A}	45	?
α_{1B}	>10,000	?
α_{2A}	330	?
α_{2B}	220	?
α_{2C}	160	?
β_{1}	>10,000	?
β_{2}	>10,000	?
H_{1}	0.06–2.3	↓
H_{2}	4.8	?
H_{3}	>10,000	?
H_{4}	202–>10,000	?
M_{1}	12	↓
M_{2}	7	↓
M_{3}	12	↓
M_{4}	8	↓
M_{5}	11.8	↓
I_{1}	204	?
σ_{1}	>10,000 (gp)	?
σ_{2}	750 (rat)	?
SERT	>10,000	–
NET	2,550	–
DAT	4,100	–
Notes: The smaller the value, the more avidly the drug binds to the site. All proteins are human unless otherwise noted. ↑ = Agonist. ↓ = Antagonist. Refs:

Cyproheptadine is a potent antihistamine or inverse agonist of the histamine H_{1} receptor. It also has anticholinergic, antiserotonergic, antidopaminergic, and local anesthetic activities. In one study, cyproheptadine had about the same affinity for the serotonin 5-HT_{2A} and 5-HT_{2B} receptors as for the histamine H_{1} receptor, about 8-fold selectivity for the histamine H_{1} receptor over the serotonin 5-HT_{2C} receptor, about 2- to 8-fold selectivity for the H_{1} receptor over the muscarinic acetylcholine receptors, and about 4- to 52-fold selectivity for the histamine H_{1} receptor over the dopamine receptors. The drug shows lower affinity for α-adrenergic receptors and little to no affinity for the monoamine transporters.

Of the serotonin receptors, it is an especially potent antagonist of the 5-HT_{2} receptors. This is thought to underlie its effectiveness in the treatment of serotonin syndrome. However, it is possible that blockade of 5-HT_{1} receptors may also contribute to its effectiveness in serotonin syndrome. Cyproheptadine has been reported to block 85% of 5-HT_{2} receptors in the human brain at a dose of 4 mg three times per day (12 mg/day total) and to block 95% of 5-HT_{2} receptors in the human brain at a dose of 6 mg three times per day (18 mg/day total) as measured with positron emission tomography (PET). The most widely used dose of cyproheptadine for serotonin syndrome has been said to be 4 mg, though doses of up to 16 mg have been used. However, according to Ken Gillman, the dose of cyproheptadine recommended to ensure blockade of the 5-HT_{2} receptors for serotonin syndrome is 20 to 30 mg based on the PET findings.

Blockade of the serotonin 5-HT_{2B} receptor may be specifically involved in the antimigraine effects of cyproheptadine. The drug has been found to prevent pergolide-induced cardiac valvulopathy, which can be assumed to be due to its serotonin 5-HT_{2B} receptor antagonism.

Cyproheptadine has been found to partially block the discriminative stimulus properties of the psychedelic drug LSD in rodent drug discrimination tests. It also antagonizes the discriminative stimulus properties of various other serotonergic agents, like 5-MeO-DMT, quipazine, fenfluramine, and 5-hydroxytryptophan (5-HTP). In addition, cyproheptadine blocks the head-twitch response induced by LSD, 5-MeO-DMT, quipazine, and 5-HTP in rodents. However, high doses of cyproheptadine have been reported to produce partial LSD-like discriminative stimulus effects in rodents. Possibly in relation to this, cyproheptadine has been said to sometimes be associated with hallucinations in humans. As an alternative possibility however, the partial generalization may instead be related to the highly non-selective nature of cyproheptadine and interactions at other neurotransmitter sites.

=== Pharmacokinetics ===
Cyproheptadine is well-absorbed following oral ingestion, with peak levels occurring after 1 to 4 hours. Its elimination half-life when taken orally is approximately 8.6 hours.

== Chemistry ==
Cyproheptadine is a tricyclic benzocycloheptene and is closely related to pizotifen and ketotifen as well as to tricyclic antidepressants.

== History ==
Cyproheptadine was patented in 1959 and was introduced for medical use in 1961.

== Society and culture ==
=== Names ===
Cyproheptadine is the generic name of the drug and its INN, BAN, and DCF. The drug's DCIT is ciproeptadina, while its BANM is cyproheptadine hydrochloride (as the hydrochloride salt) and its JAN is cyproheptadine hydrochloride hydrate (as the hydrochloride hydrate form). Synonyms of cyproheptadine include Fl-5967, HSp-1229, Glutodina, Axoprol, and Dihexazin. The drug is sold under many brand names, but its major brand names are Periactin and to a lesser extent Peritol.

=== Availability ===
Cyproheptadine is available widely throughout the world. This includes in Australia, Canada, Europe, Hong Kong, India, Japan, Mexico, Turkey, the United Kingdom, and the United States, among others.

== Research ==
=== Psychiatric disorders ===
Cyproheptadine was studied in one small trial as an adjunct in people with schizophrenia whose condition was stable and were on other medication; while attention and verbal fluency appeared to be improved, the study was too small to draw generalizations from. It has also been studied as an adjuvant in two other trials in people with schizophrenia, around fifty people overall, and did not appear to have an effect.

Cyproheptadine has been studied for the treatment of post-traumatic stress disorder.

=== Sexual dysfunction ===
There have been some trials to see if cyproheptadine could reduce sexual dysfunction caused by selective serotonin reuptake inhibitor (SSRI) and antipsychotic medications.

== Veterinary use ==
Cyproheptadine is used in cats as an appetite stimulant and as an adjunct in the treatment of asthma. Possible adverse effects include excitement and aggressive behavior. The elimination half-life of cyproheptadine in cats is 12 hours.

Cyproheptadine is a second line treatment for pituitary pars intermedia dysfunction in horses.

== See also ==
- Cyproheptadine/prazosin
