= SXC-2023 =

Clinical data
- Other names: SXC2023
- Routes of administration: Oral
- Drug class: Cystine–glutamate antiporter activator; Glutamate modulator

Identifiers
- IUPAC name: (2R)-2-acetamido-3-(4-methylbenzoyl)sulfanylpropanoic acid
- CAS Number: 1695562-36-7
- PubChem CID: 101215395
- ChemSpider: 114876523

Chemical and physical data
- Formula: C_{13}H_{15}NO_{4}S
- Molar mass: 281.33 g·mol^{−1}
- 3D model (JSmol): Interactive image
- SMILES: CC1=CC=C(C=C1)C(=O)SC[C@@H](C(=O)O)NC(=O)C
- InChI: InChI=1S/C13H15NO4S/c1-8-3-5-10(6-4-8)13(18)19-7-11(12(16)17)14-9(2)15/h3-6,11H,7H2,1-2H3,(H,14,15)(H,16,17)/t11-/m0/s1; Key:QHXPWGXGEBJOCG-NSHDSACASA-N

SXC-2023 is a cystine–glutamate antiporter (SLC7A11; System x_{c-} or Sxc) activator or glutamate modulator which is under development for the treatment of impulse control disorders such as trichotillomania (hair-pulling disorder). It is also being studied for treatment of cocaine-related disorders and smoking withdrawal. The drug is taken orally. The effects of SXC-2023 in animals have been studied. SXC-2023 was first described in the scientific literature by 2018. It was originated by Marquette University and the University of Wisconsin at Milwaukee and is under development by Promentis Pharmaceuticals and the National Institute on Drug Abuse (NIDA). As of June 2025, the drug is in phase 2 clinical trials.

== See also ==
- List of investigational other psychiatric disorder drugs
- List of investigational substance-related disorder drugs
