= Retatrutide =

Chemical compound

Clinical data
- Other names: LY-3437943

Identifiers
- IUPAC name: L-tyrosyl-2-methylalanyl-L-glutaminylglycyl-L-threonyl-L-phenylalanyl-L-threonyl-L-seryl-L-α-aspartyl-L-tyrosyl-L-seryl-L-isoleucyl-2-methyl-L-leucyl-L-leucyl-L-α-aspartyl-L-lysyl-N^{6}-(N-(19-carboxy-1-oxononadecyl)-L-γ-glutamyl-2-(2-(2-aminoethoxy)ethoxy)acetyl)-L-lysyl-L-alanyl-L-glutaminyl-2-methylalanyl-L-alanyl-L-phenylalanyl-L-isoleucyl-L-α-glutamyl-L-tyrosyl-L-leucyl-L-leucyl-L-α-glutamylglycylglycyl-L-prolyl-L-seryl-L-serylglycyl-L-alanyl-L-prolyl-L-prolyl-L-prolyl-L-serinamide
- CAS Number: 2381089-83-2
- UNII: NOP2Y096GV
- ChEMBL: ChEMBL5095485

Chemical and physical data
- SMILES: CC[C@H](C)[C@H](NC(=O)[C@H](Cc1ccccc1)NC(=O)[C@H](C)NC(=O)C(C)(C)NC(=O)[C@H](CCC(N)=O)NC(=O)[C@H](C)NC(=O)[C@H](CCCCNC(=O)COCCOCCNC(=O)CC[C@H](NC(=O)CCCCCCCCCCCCCCCCCCC(=O)O)C(=O)O)NC(=O)[C@H](CCCCN)NC(=O)[C@H](CC(=O)O)NC(=O)[C@H](CC(C)C)NC(=O)[C@](C)(CC(C)C)NC(=O)[C@@H](NC(=O)[C@H](CO)NC(=O)[C@H](Cc1ccc(O)cc1)NC(=O)[C@H](CC(=O)O)NC(=O)[C@H](CO)NC(=O)[C@@H](NC(=O)[C@H](Cc1ccccc1)NC(=O)[C@@H](NC(=O)CNC(=O)[C@H](CCC(N)=O)NC(=O)C(C)(C)NC(=O)[C@@H](N)Cc1ccc(O)cc1)[C@@H](C)O)[C@@H](C)O)[C@@H](C)CC)C(=O)N[C@@H](CCC(=O)O)C(=O)N[C@@H](Cc1ccc(O)cc1)C(=O)N[C@@H](CC(C)C)C(=O)N[C@@H](CC(C)C)C(=O)N[C@@H](CCC(=O)O)C(=O)NCC(=O)NCC(=O)N1CCC[C@H]1C(=O)N[C@@H](CO)C(=O)N[C@@H](CO)C(=O)NCC(=O)N[C@@H](C)C(=O)N1CCC[C@H]1C(=O)N1CCC[C@H]1C(=O)N1CCC[C@H]1C(=O)N[C@@H](CO)C(N)=O
- InChI: InChI=1S/C221H342N46O68/c1-23-124(11)179(208(322)241-144(83-88-176(291)292)192(306)245-150(105-134-69-75-137(276)76-70-134)196(310)244-148(100-121(5)6)194(308)243-147(99-120(3)4)193(307)240-142(82-87-175(289)290)187(301)230-110-169(282)229-113-173(286)264-92-51-61-161(264)206(320)253-158(116-270)203(317)251-157(115-269)189(303)232-111-170(283)233-128(15)212(326)266-94-53-63-163(266)214(328)267-95-54-64-164(267)213(327)265-93-52-62-162(265)207(321)250-156(114-268)183(226)297)258-200(314)152(103-131-55-41-39-42-56-131)242-185(299)127(14)235-216(331)219(18,19)262-205(319)145(80-85-166(225)279)237-184(298)126(13)234-190(304)140(60-48-50-90-227-172(285)119-335-98-97-334-96-91-228-167(280)86-81-146(215(329)330)236-168(281)65-45-37-35-33-31-29-27-25-26-28-30-32-34-36-38-46-66-174(287)288)238-191(305)141(59-47-49-89-222)239-198(312)154(107-177(293)294)247-195(309)149(101-122(7)8)256-218(333)221(22,109-123(9)10)263-211(325)180(125(12)24-2)259-204(318)160(118-272)252-197(311)151(106-135-71-77-138(277)78-72-135)246-199(313)155(108-178(295)296)248-202(316)159(117-271)254-210(324)182(130(17)274)260-201(315)153(104-132-57-43-40-44-58-132)249-209(323)181(129(16)273)257-171(284)112-231-188(302)143(79-84-165(224)278)255-217(332)220(20,21)261-186(300)139(223)102-133-67-73-136(275)74-68-133/h39-44,55-58,67-78,120-130,139-164,179-182,268-277H,23-38,45-54,59-66,79-119,222-223H2,1-22H3,(H2,224,278)(H2,225,279)(H2,226,297)(H,227,285)(H,228,280)(H,229,282)(H,230,301)(H,231,302)(H,232,303)(H,233,283)(H,234,304)(H,235,331)(H,236,281)(H,237,298)(H,238,305)(H,239,312)(H,240,307)(H,241,322)(H,242,299)(H,243,308)(H,244,310)(H,245,306)(H,246,313)(H,247,309)(H,248,316)(H,249,323)(H,250,321)(H,251,317)(H,252,311)(H,253,320)(H,254,324)(H,255,332)(H,256,333)(H,257,284)(H,258,314)(H,259,318)(H,260,315)(H,261,300)(H,262,319)(H,263,325)(H,287,288)(H,289,290)(H,291,292)(H,293,294)(H,295,296)(H,329,330)/t124-,125-,126-,127-,128-,129+,130+,139-,140-,141-,142-,143-,144-,145-,146-,147-,148-,149-,150-,151-,152-,153-,154-,155-,156-,157-,158-,159-,160-,161-,162-,163-,164-,179-,180-,181-,182-,221-/m0/s1; Key:MLOLQJNKXBNWFW-JMUPIODPSA-N

Retatrutide is an experimental drug for obesity developed by the American pharmaceutical company Eli Lilly and Company. It is a triple hormone receptor agonist on the GLP-1, GIP, and glucagon receptors.

== Adverse effects ==
The safety profile of retatrutide is still under investigation. Reported side effects have been gastrointestinal symptoms, such as nausea, vomiting, diarrhea, constipation, and abdominal discomfort. An increase in side effects occurred with increased dosages. Less commonly reported side effects have included fatigue, headaches, and mild increases to heart rate. All drugs targeting GLP-1 receptors currently have the potential risk for pancreatitis, gallbladder disease, and gastrointestinal intolerance. These effects have not been linked to retatrutide in current trials. However, long-term outcomes of side effects are still being established.

== Mechanism of action ==
GLP-1 receptors improve insulin sensitivity and increase satiety. Retatrutide has shown to increase insulin secretion. Furthermore, agonism of the glucagon receptor increases energy expenditure and promotes fat loss and metabolic activity. With current research, activation of these receptors has overall reduced caloric intake and increased energy expenditure, successfully leading to higher weight loss compared to alternative treatments.

== Chemistry ==
Retatrutide is a peptide with the following amino acid sequence

YA¹QGTFTSDYSIL²LDKK⁴AQA¹AFIEYLLEGGPSSGAPPPS³

where letters with superscripted numbers refer to the following chemical modifications:

- A¹ – 2-aminoisobutyric acid (Aib).
- L² – leucine modified with an α-methyl substituent (MeL, 2-methylleucine).
- S³ – L-serinamide (L-serine with the carboxylic acid group replaced with a carboxamide).
- K⁴ – L-lysine with the amino group at position 6 modified with a side chain; specifically, (AEEA)-(γ-Glu)-(C20 diacid) (where AEEA is 2-[2-(2-aminoethoxy)ethoxy]acetic acid, commonly used as a spacer group in synthetic peptides).

Retatrutide is synthetically engineered and produced using solid-phase peptide synthesis (SPPS). This is when amino acids are added to a peptide chain and attached to solid resin forming a backbone. After the backbone is synthesized, the molecule is cleaved chemically, then purified. Lipidation modifications also occur, meaning a fatty-acid side chain is added to promote reversible binding to albumin. This modification allows for a longer drug half-life, raising compliance as it enables once-weekly dosing.

== History ==
=== Clinical trials ===
Retatrutide was initially studied in a phase II trial involving adults without diabetes who had obesity or overweight. Phase III trials are being conducted as part of the TRIUMPH clinical development program. In September 2026, results from two phase III trials were published. In the 80-week TRIUMPH-1 randomized trial of 2,339 adults with obesity without diabetes, mean body-weight reductions were 17.6%, 23.7%, and 25.0% with weekly retatrutide doses of 4 mg, 9 mg, and 12 mg, respectively, compared with 3.9% with placebo. The trial also reported reductions in knee-osteoarthritis pain and the severity of obstructive sleep apnea. In TRIUMPH-2, retatrutide was studied in adults with obesity or overweight and type 2 diabetes, with the phase III trial reporting reductions in both body weight and glycated hemoglobin levels.

Preclinical and biochemical studies describe receptor activity at GLP-1, GIP, and glucagon receptors. Reports on its development state that it was engineered for activity across these targets.

Systematic reviews and meta-analyses of randomized controlled trials report that retatrutide produces substantial reductions in body weight in adults with obesity, with mean percentage weight loss typically between 15 and 24 percent over 48 to 72 weeks, depending on study protocols and populations. Adverse events are most commonly gastrointestinal symptoms such as nausea and diarrhea, with relatively low rates of study discontinuation and infrequent serious adverse events reported during trials. Safety assessments also indicate a low risk of hypoglycemia and no significant elevation in cardiovascular or hepatic adverse events in non-diabetic populations across published studies.

== Society and culture ==
Multiple black market sellers of the peptide emerged before approval of the Lilly drug, leading to multiple lawsuits with Lilly as the plaintiff.

== Research ==
Retatrutide is under preliminary research for how it may influence obesity-associated cancer progression.

== See also ==
- Brenipatide
- GLP-1 receptor agonist
- Semaglutide
- Tirzepatide
