= ZCZ-011 =

Chemical compound

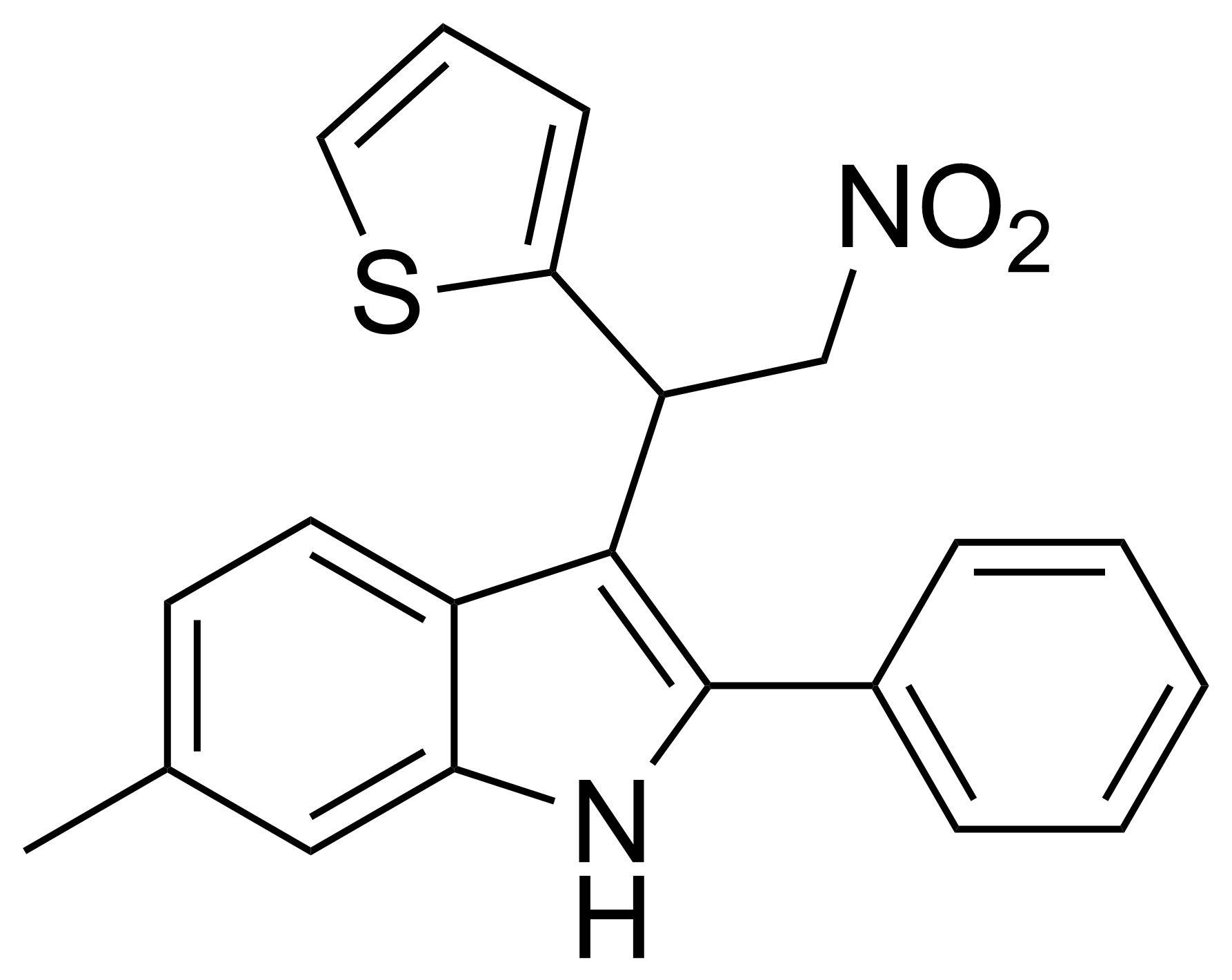

Identifiers
- IUPAC name: 6-methyl-3-(2-nitro-1-(thiophen-2-yl)ethyl)-2-phenyl-1H-indole
- CAS Number: 1998197-39-9
- PubChem CID: 71819307
- IUPHAR/BPS: 9239
- ChemSpider: 57871143
- UNII: TT8WUB7KTF
- PDB ligand: 7IC (PDBe, RCSB PDB)
- CompTox Dashboard (EPA): DTXSID801046384

Chemical and physical data
- Formula: C_{21}H_{18}N_{2}O_{2}S
- Molar mass: 362.45 g·mol^{−1}
- 3D model (JSmol): Interactive image
- SMILES: Cc1ccc2c([nH]c(c3ccccc3)c2C(C[N+]([O-])=O)c4sccc4)c1
- InChI: InChI=1S/C21H18N2O2S/c1-14-9-10-16-18(12-14)22-21(15-6-3-2-4-7-15)20(16)17(13-23(24)25)19-8-5-11-26-19/h2-12,17,22H,13H2,1H3; Key:RJSPNRDBWHHFMH-UHFFFAOYSA-N

ZCZ-011 is a positive allosteric modulator of the cannabinoid CB_{1} receptor.

== See also ==
- Substituted tryptamine
- GAT100
- Org 27569
- PSNCBAM-1
