= Zabaglurant =

Clinical data
- Other names: HTL14242; HTL-14242; HTL-0014242; HTL0014242; Heptares 25; TMP-301; TMP301
- Routes of administration: Oral
- Drug class: Metabotropic glutamate mGlu_{5} receptor negative allosteric modulator

Identifiers
- IUPAC name: 3-chloro-5-[6-(5-fluoro-2-pyridinyl)pyrimidin-4-yl]benzonitrile
- CAS Number: 1644645-32-8
- PubChem CID: 86763358
- IUPHAR/BPS: 14266
- ChemSpider: 58979975
- ChEMBL: ChEMBL3603923
- PDB ligand: 51E (PDBe, RCSB PDB)
- CompTox Dashboard (EPA): DTXSID901352164

Chemical and physical data
- Formula: C_{16}H_{8}ClFN_{4}
- Molar mass: 310.72 g·mol^{−1}
- 3D model (JSmol): Interactive image
- SMILES: C1=CC(=NC=C1F)C2=CC(=NC=N2)C3=CC(=CC(=C3)C#N)Cl
- InChI: InChI=1S/C16H8ClFN4/c17-12-4-10(7-19)3-11(5-12)15-6-16(22-9-21-15)14-2-1-13(18)8-20-14/h1-6,8-9H; Key:FQAXDSVNYVVQSE-UHFFFAOYSA-N

Zabaglurant (INN; developmental code names HTL14242 and TMP-301) is a metabotropic glutamate mGlu_{5} receptor negative allosteric modulator which is under development for the treatment of alcoholism (alcohol use disorder). It is taken orally. The drug was first described in the scientific literature by 2015. It was developed by Sosei Heptares, Nxera Pharma, and Tempero Bio. As of April 2026, the drug is in phase 2 clinical trials for alcoholism. It was also under development for cocaine-related disorders, other substance-related disorders, anxiety disorders, neurological disorders, and psychiatric disorders, but no recent development has been reported or development was discontinued for these indications. In April 2026, a phase 2 trial for alcoholism was terminated due to serious adverse events.

== See also ==
- List of investigational substance-related disorder drugs
