= GAT100 =

Chemical compound; modulator of the cannabinoid CB1 receptor

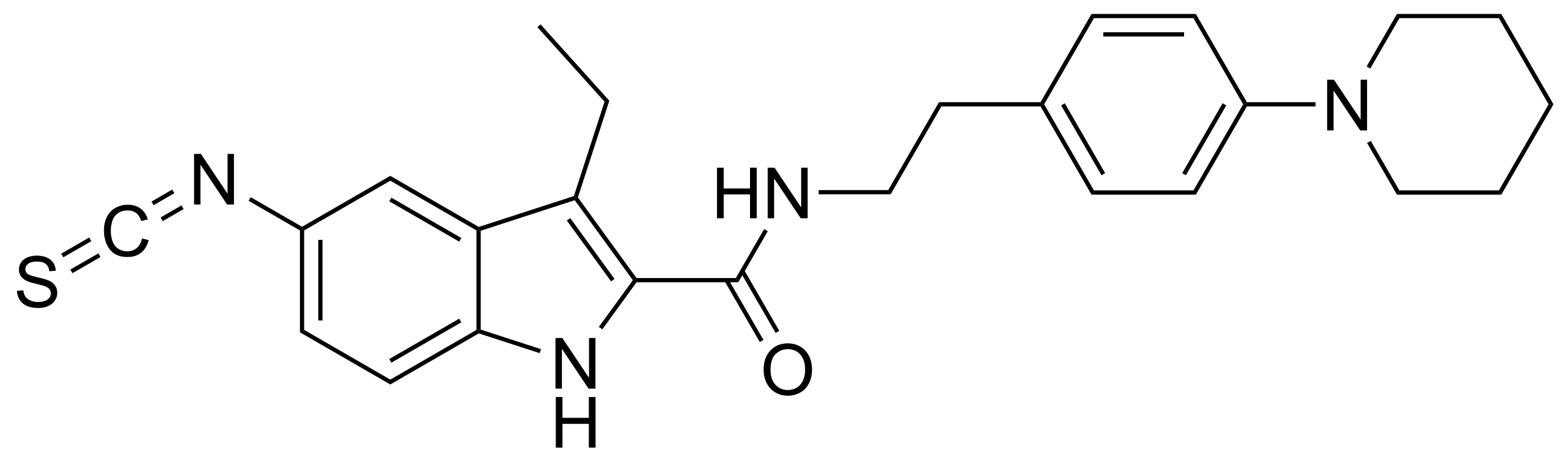

Identifiers
- IUPAC name: 3-ethyl-5-isothiocyanato-N-(4-(piperidin-1-yl)phenethyl)-1H-indole-2-carboxamide
- CAS Number: 1663564-42-8
- ChemSpider: 58145179
- UNII: JA6FTF7C5A

Chemical and physical data
- Formula: C_{25}H_{28}N_{4}OS
- Molar mass: 432.59 g·mol^{−1}
- 3D model (JSmol): Interactive image
- SMILES: CCc1c([nH]c2ccc(cc12)N=C=S)C(=O)NCCc3ccc(cc3)N4CCCCC4
- InChI: InChI=1S/C25H28N4OS/c1-2-21-22-16-19(27-17-31)8-11-23(22)28-24(21)25(30)26-13-12-18-6-9-20(10-7-18)29-14-4-3-5-15-29/h6-11,16,28H,2-5,12-15H2,1H3,(H,26,30); Key:YIYLMDVRSNXYOT-UHFFFAOYSA-N

GAT100 is a negative allosteric modulator of the cannabinoid CB_{1} receptor.

== See also ==
- Org 27569
- PSNCBAM-1
- ZCZ-011
