= Org 27569 =

Chemical compound

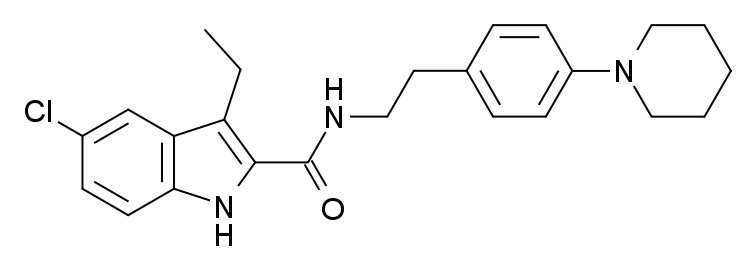

Identifiers
- IUPAC name: 5-chloro-3-ethyl-1H-indole-2-carboxylic acid [2-(4-piperidin-1-yl-phenyl)ethyl]amide
- CAS Number: 868273-06-7
- PubChem CID: 44828492
- IUPHAR/BPS: 7851
- ChemSpider: 22369629
- UNII: 7YW2S3Z2CB
- CompTox Dashboard (EPA): DTXSID00660764

Chemical and physical data
- Formula: C_{24}H_{28}ClN_{3}O
- Molar mass: 409.96 g·mol^{−1}
- 3D model (JSmol): Interactive image
- SMILES: CCc1c2cc(Cl)ccc2[nH]c1C(=O)NCCc3ccc(cc3)N4CCCCC4
- InChI: InChI=1S/C24H28ClN3O/c1-2-20-21-16-18(25)8-11-22(21)27-23(20)24(29)26-13-12-17-6-9-19(10-7-17)28-14-4-3-5-15-28/h6-11,16,27H,2-5,12-15H2,1H3,(H,26,29); Key:AHFZDNYNXFMRFQ-UHFFFAOYSA-N

Org 27569 is a drug which acts as a potent and selective negative allosteric modulator of the cannabinoid CB_{1} receptor. Studies in vitro suggest that it binds to a regulatory site on the CB_{1} receptor target, causing a conformational change that increases the binding affinity of CB_{1} agonists such as CP 55,940, while decreasing the binding affinity of CB_{1} antagonists or inverse agonists such as rimonabant. However while Org 27569 increases the ability of CB_{1} agonists to bind to the receptor, it decreases their efficacy at stimulating second messenger signalling once bound, and so in practice behaves as an insurmountable antagonist of CB_{1} receptor function.

== See also ==
- GAT100
- PSNCBAM-1
- ZCZ-011
