= Psychogenic pruritus =

Pruritus not associated with a dermatological or systemic cause

- Specialty: Psychiatry

Psychogenic pruritus, also known as psychogenic itch or functional itch disorder, is pruritus not associated with a dermatologic or systemic cause. More often than not, it is attributed to a psychiatric cause. Psychogenic pruritus is not the same as neuropathic itch though both are conditions which require more research. This condition is not explained well in DSM-5 and is typically considered a diagnosis of exclusion. This condition is not well-studied and is difficult to ascertain as it is seen by both dermatologists and psychiatrists. In order to provide some consensus to this condition, the French Psychodermatology Group have created diagnostic criteria for this condition.

== Signs and symptoms ==
Psychogenic pruritus typically appears as itching on the face and on the extensor surfaces of the body. This includes the back side of the arms, the abdomen, the side of the legs and the upper back and shoulders. These areas are more frequent because they are within hand's reach.

== Diagnosis ==
When considering the diagnosis of psychogenic pruritus, it is important to rule out medical, dermatologic and neuropathic causes. A strong history should be obtained and appropriate labwork should be drawn. One should consider drawing for a CBC (complete blood count), ESR (erythrocyte sedimentation rate), liver, renal and thyroid panel as abnormalities with any can contribute to pruritus. Pruritus can be seen with hepatic and renal disease such as cholestasis, alcoholic liver disease, primary biliary cholangitis, hepatitis B and C, and chronic kidney disease. Drug and alcohol use can contribute to pruritus as well so it is worthwhile to gather a social history. Those who use cocaine and amphetamines may experience pruritus due to feelings of abnormal cutaneous sensations called 'delusions of parasitosis', also known as "meth mites". Opioid users can also experience pruritus so examining a patient's medication list can be beneficial.

=== Diagnostic criteria ===
The French Psychodermatology Group is a subgroup of the French Society of Dermatology made up on psychiatrists, dermatologists and psychologists. They met in 2007 to propose diagnostic criteria for this disease in hope of preventing further misdiagnosis of this condition. They believed the term "functional itch disorder" was the best phrase to describe this condition, avoiding the use of the word "psychogenic". To diagnose a patient with functional itch disorder, the patient should meet three required criteria and three of seven optional criteria.

Diagnostic Criteria:

- 3 Required criteria
  - Localized or generalized pruritus without a primary skin lesion
  - Chronic pruritus, characterized as being greater than 6 weeks
  - There is no somatic cause present
- 7 Optional criteria (need 3 to diagnose)
  - A chronological relationship of pruritus with one or several life events that can have psychological consequences
  - Changes during the nighttime
  - More present during rest or inaction
  - There is a coupled psychological disorder
  - Pruritus that could be improved with psychotropic drugs
  - Pruritus that could be improved by psychotherapies

== Treatment ==
The treatment for this condition has not been well studied but the most common options are psychotherapy and medicines geared toward psychiatric conditions. Stress reduction and relaxation techniques have also been shown to be helpful for alleviating this condition. Having a strong physician-patient alliance can also lead to the improvement of symptoms. The condition is often managed with drugs including H_{1}-antihistamines, tricyclic antidepressants, tetracyclic antidepressants, selective serotonin reuptake inhibitors, antipsychotics, or benzodiazepines.

If the cause is found to be dermatologic in nature, dermatologists can offer solutions such as intralesional injections, wet wraps and other occlusive options. Menthol and cool compresses can also relieve the patient of their itch. It is also common for psychologic conditions such as obsessive–compulsive disorder, depression, anxiety, bipolar disorder, and psychosis to present with pruritus.

== Epidemiology ==
The incidence is not known. However, it is more common in females of the age range of 30–45 years.

== See also ==
- List of cutaneous conditions
