= PSNCBAM-1 =

Chemical compound

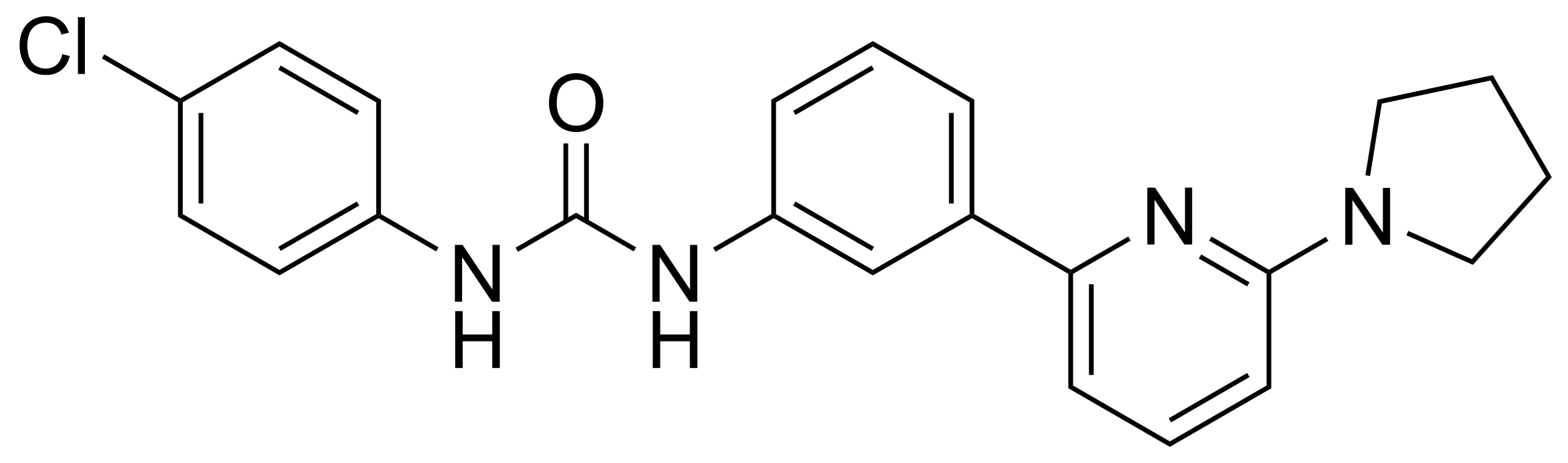

Identifiers
- IUPAC name: 1-(4-chlorophenyl)-3-(3-(6-(pyrrolidin-1-yl)pyridin-2-yl)phenyl)urea
- CAS Number: 877202-74-9
- PubChem CID: 11560249
- ChemSpider: 9735023
- UNII: P34SC5V6W2
- CompTox Dashboard (EPA): DTXSID701046393

Chemical and physical data
- Formula: C_{22}H_{21}ClN_{4}O
- Molar mass: 392.89 g·mol^{−1}
- 3D model (JSmol): Interactive image
- SMILES: Clc1ccc(NC(=O)Nc2cccc(c2)c3cccc(n3)N4CCCC4)cc1
- InChI: InChI=1S/C22H21ClN4O/c23-17-9-11-18(12-10-17)24-22(28)25-19-6-3-5-16(15-19)20-7-4-8-21(26-20)27-13-1-2-14-27/h3-12,15H,1-2,13-14H2,(H2,24,25,28); Key:HDAYFSFWIPRJSO-UHFFFAOYSA-N

PSNCBAM-1 is a negative allosteric modulator of the cannabinoid CB_{1} receptor.

== See also ==
- GAT100
- Org 27569
- ZCZ-011
