= Sembragiline =

Clinical data
- Other names: EVT-302; EVT302; RG-1577; RG1577; RO-4602522; RO4602522
- Routes of administration: Oral
- Drug class: Reversible monoamine oxidase B (MAO-B) inhibitor

Identifiers
- IUPAC name: N-[(3S)-1-[4-[(3-fluorophenyl)methoxy]phenyl]-5-oxopyrrolidin-3-yl]acetamide
- CAS Number: 676479-06-4
- PubChem CID: 10246762
- ChemSpider: 8422249
- UNII: K3W9672PNJ
- KEGG: D11224
- ChEMBL: ChEMBL3707394

Chemical and physical data
- Formula: C_{19}H_{19}FN_{2}O_{3}
- Molar mass: 342.370 g·mol^{−1}
- 3D model (JSmol): Interactive image
- SMILES: CC(=O)N[C@H]1CC(=O)N(C1)C2=CC=C(C=C2)OCC3=CC(=CC=C3)F
- InChI: InChI=1S/C19H19FN2O3/c1-13(23)21-16-10-19(24)22(11-16)17-5-7-18(8-6-17)25-12-14-3-2-4-15(20)9-14/h2-9,16H,10-12H2,1H3,(H,21,23)/t16-/m0/s1; Key:VMAVCCUQTALHOB-INIZCTEOSA-N

Sembragiline (INN, USAN; developmental code names EVT-302, RG-1577, RO-4602522) is a selective and reversible monoamine oxidase B (MAO-B) inhibitor which is or was under development for the treatment of Alzheimer's disease. It was also under development for the treatment of smoking withdrawal, but development for this indication was discontinued. The drug is taken by mouth. Sembragiline is or was being developed by Roche and Evotec SE.
