= SBP-9330 =

Possible drug for treating drug dependence

Clinical data
- Other names: 4-chloro-3′-((2-cyclopentyl-1-oxoisoindolin-5-yloxy)methyl)biphenyl-3-carboxylic acid
- Routes of administration: Oral
- Drug class: Positive allosteric modulator of mGluR2

Legal status
- Legal status: Investigational

Identifiers
- IUPAC name: 4-chloro-3′-((2-cyclopentyl-1-oxoisoindolin-5-yloxy)methyl)biphenyl-3-carboxylic acid
- CAS Number: 1260224-86-9
- PubChem CID: 46182745
- ChemSpider: 26389922
- UNII: EH47U5Q8JM
- ChEMBL: ChEMBL1651208

Chemical and physical data
- Formula: C_{27}H_{24}ClNO_{4}
- Molar mass: 461.94 g·mol^{−1}
- 3D model (JSmol): Interactive image
- SMILES: OC(=O)c1cc(ccc1Cl)-c1cccc(COc2ccc3C(=O)N(Cc3c2)C2CCCC2)c1
- InChI: InChI=1S/C27H24ClNO4/c28-24-9-7-22(19-4-2-3-5-20(19)24)18-31-21-6-8-25-23(16-31)27(32)29(26(25)17-21)14-11-12-15-27/h2-9,16,18,21H,11-15,17H2,1H3,(H,32,27); Key:DWTYHCYVKJONSP-UHFFFAOYSA-N

SBP 9330 is an investigational small-molecule drug and a positive allosteric modulator (PAM) of the metabotropic glutamate receptor 2 (mGluR2), being developed as a potential treatment for nicotine dependence and other substance-use disorders.

== Chemistry ==
SBP 9330 is chemically named 4-chloro-3′-((2-cyclopentyl-1-oxoisoindolin-5-yloxy)methyl)biphenyl-3-carboxylic acid. It consists of a biphenyl-3-carboxylic acid core bearing a chloro substituent and an isoindolinone-derived ether moiety.

== Pharmacology ==
=== Pharmacokinetics ===
Pharmacokinetic analyses showed oral bioavailability, dose-dependent increases in plasma exposure, and parameters compatible with once-daily dosing.

=== Pharmacodynamics ===
SBP 9330 acts as a positive allosteric modulator of mGluR2, a presynaptic G-protein-coupled receptor involved in regulating glutamatergic neurotransmission. Rather than activating the receptor directly, PAMs enhance the receptor's response to endogenous glutamate. Activation of mGluR2 reduces glutamate release in brain regions implicated in reward processing and addiction, including the prefrontal cortex and nucleus accumbens.

== History ==
SBP 9330 was discovered in medicinal chemistry programs aimed at identifying orally bioavailable mGluR2 PAMs. Early structure–activity relationship studies optimized potency, brain penetration, and pharmacokinetic properties.

It was disclosed in the following patents:

- US13051798 – Positive allosteric modulators of group II mGluRs
- WO2025019598A1 – Positive allosteric modulator of the metabotropic glutamate receptor subtype 2 receptor, synthesis and solid forms thereof

== Research ==
=== Addiction models ===
Preclinical studies demonstrated that SBP 9330 decreased cocaine self-administration in rats, suggesting attenuation of drug-reinforcing effects. Additional experiments within the same paper showed reductions in drug-seeking behavior, attenuation of cue-induced reinstatement, and decreased reward-associated responding.

=== Nicotine dependence ===
SBP 9330 has been evaluated as a potential aid to smoking cessation. In animal models of nicotine reinforcement, mGluR2 positive allosteric modulation was associated with reduced nicotine self-administration and decreased nicotine-seeking behavior.

== Clinical development ==
=== Phase I ===
A randomized, double-blind, placebo-controlled Phase I study evaluated the safety, tolerability, and pharmacokinetics of SBP 9330 following single and multiple ascending oral doses in healthy volunteers.
