= Radiprodil =

Clinical data
- Other names: RGH-896; RGH896
- Routes of administration: Oral
- Drug class: NR2B subunit-containing NMDA receptor negative allosteric modulator

Identifiers
- IUPAC name: 2-[4-[(4-fluorophenyl)methyl]piperidin-1-yl]-2-oxo-N-(2-oxo-3H-1,3-benzoxazol-6-yl)acetamide
- CAS Number: 496054-87-6
- PubChem CID: 10200813
- DrugBank: DB12260
- ChemSpider: 8376312
- UNII: 5XGC17ZKUF
- KEGG: D13319
- ChEMBL: ChEMBL182066
- CompTox Dashboard (EPA): DTXSID80964297

Chemical and physical data
- Formula: C_{21}H_{20}FN_{3}O_{4}
- Molar mass: 397.406 g·mol^{−1}
- 3D model (JSmol): Interactive image
- SMILES: C1CN(CCC1CC2=CC=C(C=C2)F)C(=O)C(=O)NC3=CC4=C(C=C3)NC(=O)O4
- InChI: InChI=1S/C21H20FN3O4/c22-15-3-1-13(2-4-15)11-14-7-9-25(10-8-14)20(27)19(26)23-16-5-6-17-18(12-16)29-21(28)24-17/h1-6,12,14H,7-11H2,(H,23,26)(H,24,28); Key:GKGRZLGAQZPEHO-UHFFFAOYSA-N

Radiprodil (INN; developmental code name RGH-896) is an NR2B (GluN2B; GRIN2B) subunit-selective NMDA receptor negative allosteric modulator which is under development for the treatment of neurodevelopmental disorders, focal cortical dysplasia, tuberous sclerosis, behavioral disorders, and seizures. It is taken orally. The drug is being developed by GRIN Therapeutics. As of December 2025, it is in phase 3 clinical trials for neurodevelopmental disorders, phase 1/2 trials for focal cortical dysplasia and tuberous sclerosis, and phase 1 trials for behavioral disorders and seizures. The drug was first described in the scientific literature by 2003.

== See also ==
- NMDA receptor antagonist
