= Substance-related disorder =

Class of mental disorders related to substance use

- Specialty: Psychiatry, clinical psychology

Substance-related disorders are a class of disorders listed in the DSM-5 that are "related to the taking of a drug of abuse (including alcohol)".

Substance-related disorders are most prevalent in individuals ages 18–25, with a higher likelihood occurring in men compared to women, and urban residents compared to rural residents. On average, general medical facilities hold 22% of patients with substance-related disorders, possibly leading to psychiatric disorders later on. Over 50% of individuals with substance-related disorders will often have a "dual diagnosis", where they are diagnosed with the substance use, as well as a psychiatric diagnosis, the most common being major depressive disorder, personality disorders, anxiety disorders, and dysthymia.

Substance use, also known as drug use, is a patterned use of a substance in which the user consumes the substance in amounts or with methods which are harmful to themselves or others. The drugs used are often associated with levels of substance intoxication that alter judgment, perception, attention, and physical control, not related with medical effects. It is often thought that the main used substances are illegal drugs and alcohol; however, it is becoming more common that prescription drugs and tobacco are a prevalent problem.

== Signs and symptoms ==
Common symptoms include:

- Sudden changes in behaviour – may engage in secretive or suspicious behaviour
- Mood changes – anger towards others, paranoia and little care shown about themselves or their future
- Problems with work or school – lack of attendance
- Changes in eating and sleeping habits
- Changes in friendship groups and poor family relationships
- A sudden unexplained change in financial needs – leading to borrowing/stealing money

There are many more symptoms such as physical and psychological changes, though this is often dependent on which substance is being used. It is, however, common that people who use substances will experience unpleasant withdrawal symptoms if the drug is taken away from them.

It is also reported that others have strong cravings even after they have not used the drug for a long period of time. This is called being "clean". To determine how the brain triggers these cravings, multiple tests have been done on mice. It is also now thought that these cravings can be explained by substance-related disorders as a subcategory of personality disorders as classified by the DSM-5.

== Classification and terminology ==
Substance-related disorders were originally subcategorized into "substance use disorders" (SUD) and "substance-induced disorders" (SID). Though DSM-IV makes a firm distinction between the two, SIDs often occur in the context of SUDs.

=== Substance-induced disorder ===
Substance-induced disorders include medical conditions that can be directly attributed to the use of a substance. These conditions include substance intoxication, substance withdrawal, and substance/medication-induced mental disorders (e.g., substance-induced delirium, substance-induced psychosis, and substance-induced mood disorders).

=== Substance use disorder ===
In the DSM-IV, it was formally divided in substance use and in substance dependence, but in the DSM-5-TR both were combined into a single condition called "Substance-use disorder". In this new revision more presenting symptoms are required before a diagnosis is made. It also considers each different substance as its own separate disorder, based upon the same basic criteria. The DSM-5-TR also defines the term "drug addiction" as because of its uncertain definition and its potentially negative connotation.

=== Complications ===
There are many potential complications that can arise due to substance use such as severe physiological damage, psychological changes and social changes that are often not desirable.

Physiological damage is often the most obvious, observed as an abnormal condition affecting the body of an organism: For instance, there are several known alcohol-induced diseases (e.g., alcoholic hepatitis, alcoholic liver disease, alcoholic cardiomyopathy). Substance use is also often associated with premature aging, fertility complications, brain damage and a higher risk of infectious diseases due to a weakened immune system.

Long-term use has been linked to personality changes such as depression, paranoia, and anxiety, which can be related to psychiatric disorders. It is often reported that substance use coincides with personality disorders, such as borderline personality disorder. It has also now been linked to alterations in brain function leading to an inability to control behaviours, which could explain why many people who use substances go on to develop addictions.

Substance use is often regarded as negative in society and therefore those who engage in such behaviours can often be subject to social discrimination. The use of many drugs can lead to criminal convictions, whether the drug itself is illegal or people who use them use unlawful methods to fund their substances. It is also more likely that someone will partake in criminal or anti-social behaviour when they are under the influence of a drug.

== See also ==
- Anxiety
- Behavioural sciences
- Chemical dependency
- List of investigational substance-related disorder drugs
- Major depressive disorder
- Psychological trauma
- Self-medication
- Shared care
- Substance use disorder
- Drug rehabilitation
- Dual diagnosis
