= Melevodopa/carbidopa =

Combination dopaminergic medication

- Melevodopa

- Carbidopa

Combination of
- Melevodopa: Dopamine receptor agonist
- Carbidopa: Aromatic L-amino acid decarboxylase inhibitor

Clinical data
- Trade names: Sirio
- Other names: Carbidopa/melevodopa; Levodopa methyl ester/carbidopa; CHF-1512; CHF1512; CNP-1512; CNP1512; GT-1512; GT1512; V-1512; V1512
- Routes of administration: Oral

Melevodopa/carbidopa, sold under the brand name Sirio, is a combination of melevodopa, a prodrug of the dopamine precursor and hence non-selective dopamine receptor agonist levodopa (L-DOPA), and carbidopa, a peripherally selective aromatic L-amino acid decarboxylase (AAAD) inhibitor, which is used in the treatment of Parkinson's disease in Italy. It is taken orally in the form of tablets.

== See also ==
- Levodopa/carbidopa
- Foscarbidopa/foslevodopa
- Levodopa/carbidopa/entacapone
- Levodopa/benserazide
