= Dopaminergic =

Substance related to dopamine functions

The chemical structure of the neurotransmitter dopamine

Dopaminergic means "related to dopamine" (literally, "working on dopamine"), a common neurotransmitter. Dopaminergic substances or actions increase dopamine-related activity in the brain.

Dopaminergic brain pathways facilitate dopamine-related activity. For example, certain proteins such as the dopamine transporter (DAT), vesicular monoamine transporter 2 (VMAT_{2}), and dopamine receptors can be classified as dopaminergic, and neurons that synthesize or contain dopamine and synapses with dopamine receptors in them may also be labeled as dopaminergic. Enzymes that regulate the biosynthesis or metabolism of dopamine such as aromatic L-amino acid decarboxylase or DOPA decarboxylase, monoamine oxidase (MAO), and catechol O-methyl transferase (COMT) may be referred to as dopaminergic as well.

Also, any endogenous or exogenous chemical substance that acts to affect dopamine receptors or dopamine release through indirect actions (for example, on neurons that synapse onto neurons that release dopamine or express dopamine receptors) can also be said to have dopaminergic effects, two prominent examples being opioids, which enhance dopamine release indirectly in the reward pathways, and some substituted amphetamines, which enhance dopamine release directly by binding to and inhibiting VMAT_{2}.

== Dopaminergic agents ==
=== Dopamine precursors ===
Dopamine precursors including L-phenylalanine and L-tyrosine are used as dietary supplements. L-DOPA (Levodopa), another precursor, is used in the treatment of Parkinson's disease. Prodrugs of levodopa, including melevodopa, etilevodopa, foslevodopa, and XP-21279 also exist. They are inactive themselves but are converted into dopamine and hence act as non-selective dopamine receptor agonists.

=== Dopamine receptor ligands ===
==== Dopamine receptor agonists ====
Dopamine receptor agonists can be divided into non-selective dopamine receptor agonists, D_{1}-like receptor agonists, and D_{2}-like receptor agonists.

Non-selective dopamine receptor agonists include dopamine, deoxyepinephrine (epinine), dinoxyline, and dopexamine. They are mostly peripherally selective drugs, are often also adrenergic receptor agonists, and are used to treat certain cardiovascular conditions.

D_{2}-like receptor agonists include the ergolines bromocriptine, cabergoline, dihydroergocryptine, ergoloid, lisuride, metergoline, pergolide, quinagolide, and terguride; the morphine analogue apomorphine; and the structurally distinct agents piribedil, pramipexole, ropinirole, rotigotine, and talipexole. Some of these agents also have weak affinity for the D_{1}-like receptors. They are used to treat Parkinson's disease, restless legs syndrome, hyperprolactinemia, prolactinomas, acromegaly, erectile dysfunction, and for lactation suppression. They are also being studied in the treatment of depression and are sometimes used in the treatment of disorders of diminished motivation like apathy, abulia, and akinetic mutism.

D_{1}-like receptor agonists include 6-Br-APB, A-68930, A-77636, A-86929, adrogolide, dihydrexidine, dinapsoline, doxanthrine, fenoldopam, razpipadon, SKF-81,297, SKF-82,958, SKF-89,145, tavapadon, and trepipam. They have been researched for and are under development for the treatment of Parkinson's disease and dementia-related apathy. Peripherally selective D_{1}-like receptor agonists like fenoldopam are used to treat hypertensive crisis.

==== Dopamine receptor positive allosteric modulators ====
Positive allosteric modulators of the dopamine D_{1} receptor like mevidalen and glovadalen are under development for the treatment of Lewy body disease and Parkinson's disease.

==== Dopamine receptor antagonists ====
Dopamine receptor antagonists including typical antipsychotics such as chlorpromazine (Thorazine), fluphenazine, haloperidol (Haldol), loxapine, molindone, perphenazine, pimozide, thioridazine, thiothixene, and trifluoperazine, the atypical antipsychotics such as amisulpride, clozapine, olanzapine, quetiapine (Seroquel), risperidone (Risperdal), sulpiride, and ziprasidone, and antiemetics like domperidone, metoclopramide, and prochlorperazine, among others, which are used in the treatment of schizophrenia and bipolar disorder as antipsychotics, and nausea and vomiting.

Dopamine receptor antagonists can be divided into D_{1}-like receptor antagonists and D_{2}-like receptor antagonists. Ecopipam is an example of a D_{1}-like receptor antagonist.

At low doses, dopamine D_{2} and D_{3} receptor antagonists can preferentially block presynaptic dopamine D_{2} and D_{3} autoreceptors and thereby increase dopamine levels and enhance dopaminergic neurotransmission. Examples of dopamine D_{2} and D_{3} receptor antagonists which have been used in this way include amisulpride, sulpiride, and ENX-104.

==== Dopamine receptor negative allosteric modulators ====
Negative allosteric modulators of the dopamine receptors, such as SB269652, have been identified and are being researched.

=== Dopamine transporter modulators and related ===
==== Dopamine reuptake inhibitors ====
Dopamine reuptake inhibitors (DRIs) or dopamine transporter (DAT) inhibitors such as methylphenidate (Ritalin), amineptine, nomifensine, cocaine, bupropion, modafinil, armodafinil, phenylpiracetam, mesocarb, and vanoxerine, among others. They are used in the treatment of attention-deficit hyperactivity disorder (ADHD) as psychostimulants, narcolepsy as wakefulness-promoting agents, obesity and binge eating disorder as appetite suppressants, depression as antidepressants, and fatigue as pro-motivational agents. They are also used as illicit street and recreational drugs due to their potentially euphoriant and psychostimulant effects.

==== Dopamine releasing agents ====
Dopamine releasing agents (DRAs) such as phenethylamine, amphetamine, lisdexamfetamine (Vyvanse), methamphetamine, methylenedioxymethamphetamine (MDMA), phenmetrazine, pemoline, 4-methylaminorex (4-MAR), phentermine, and benzylpiperazine, among many others, which, like DRIs, are used in the treatment of attention-deficit hyperactivity disorder (ADHD) and narcolepsy as psychostimulants, obesity as anorectics, depression and anxiety as antidepressants and anxiolytics respectively, drug addiction as anticraving agents, and sexual dysfunction as aphrodisiacs. Many of these compounds are also illicit street or recreational drugs.

==== Dopaminergic activity enhancers ====
Dopaminergic activity enhancers such as the prescription drug selegiline (deprenyl) and the research chemicals BPAP and PPAP enhance the action potential-mediated release of dopamine. This is in contrast to dopamine releasing agents like amphetamine, which induce the uncontrolled release of dopamine regardless of electrical stimulation. The effects of the activity enhancers may be mediated by intracellular TAAR1 agonism coupled with uptake into monoaminergic neurons by monoamine transporters. Dopaminergic activity enhancers are of interest in the potential treatment of a number of medical disorders, such as depression and Parkinson's disease. To date, only phenylethylamine, tryptamine, and tyramine have been identified as endogenous activity enhancers.

==== Dopamine depleting agents ====
Vesicular monoamine transporter 2 (VMAT_{2}) inhibitors such as reserpine, tetrabenazine, valbenazine, and deutetrabenazine act as dopamine depleting agents and are used as sympatholytics or antihypertensives, to treat tardive dyskinesia, and in the past as antipsychotics. They have been associated with side effects including depression, apathy, fatigue, amotivation, and suicidality.

=== Dopamine metabolism modulators ===
==== Monoamine oxidase inhibitors ====
Monoamine oxidase (MAO) inhibitors (MAOIs) including non-selective agents such as phenelzine, tranylcypromine, isocarboxazid, and pargyline, MAO_{A} selective agents like moclobemide and clorgyline, and MAO_{B} selective agents such as selegiline and rasagiline, as well as the harmala alkaloids like harmine, harmaline, tetrahydroharmine, harmalol, harman, and norharman, which are found to varying degrees in Nicotiana tabacum (tobacco), Banisteriopsis caapi (ayahuasca, yage), Peganum harmala (Harmal, Syrian Rue), Passiflora incarnata (Passion Flower), and Tribulus terrestris, among others, which are used in the treatment of depression and anxiety as antidepressants and anxiolytics, respectively, in the treatment of Parkinson's disease and dementia, and for the recreational purpose of boosting the effects of certain drugs like phenethylamine (PEA) and psychedelics like dimethyltryptamine (DMT) via inhibiting their metabolism.

==== Catechol O-methyltransferase inhibitors ====
Catechol O-methyl transferase (COMT) inhibitors such as entacapone, opicapone, and tolcapone, which are used in the treatment of Parkinson's disease. Entacapone and opicapone are peripherally selective, but tolcapone significantly crosses the blood–brain barrier. Tolcapone is under study for potential treatment of certain psychiatric disorders such as obsessive–compulsive disorder and schizophrenia.

==== Aromatic L-amino acid decarboxylase inhibitors ====
Aromatic L-amino acid decarboxylase (AAAD) or DOPA decarboxylase inhibitors including benserazide, carbidopa, and methyldopa, which are used in the treatment of Parkinson's disease in augmentation of L-DOPA to block the peripheral conversion of dopamine, thereby inhibiting undesirable side-effects, and as sympatholytic or antihypertensive agents.

==== Dopamine β-hydroxylase inhibitors ====
Dopamine β-hydroxylase inhibitors like disulfiram (Antabuse), which can be used in the treatment of addiction to cocaine and similar dopaminergic drugs as a deterrent drug. The excess dopamine resulting from inhibition of the dopamine β-hydroxylase enzyme increases unpleasant symptoms such as anxiety, higher blood pressure, and restlessness. Disulfiram is not an anticraving agent, because it does not decrease craving for drugs. Instead, positive punishment from its unpleasant effects deters drug consumption. Other dopamine β-hydroxylase inhibitors include the centrally active nepicastat and the peripherally selective etamicastat and zamicastat.

==== Other enzyme inhibitors ====
Phenylalanine hydroxylase inhibitors like 3,4-dihydroxystyrene), which is currently only a research chemical with no suitable therapeutic indications, likely because such drugs would induce the potentially highly dangerous hyperphenylalaninemia or phenylketonuria.

Tyrosine hydroxylase inhibitors like metirosine, which is used in the treatment of pheochromocytoma as a sympatholytic or antihypertensive agent.

=== Dopaminergic neurotoxins ===
Dopaminergic neurotoxins like 6-hydroxydopamine (6-OHDA) and MPTP are used in scientific research to lesion the dopamine system and study the biological role of dopamine.

=== Miscellaneous agents ===
==== Adamantane derivatives ====
Amantadine has dopaminergic effects through uncertain mechanisms of action. It is structurally related to other adamantanes like bromantane and rimantadine, which also have dopaminergic actions. Bromantane can upregulate tyrosine hydroxylase (TH) and thereby increase dopamine production and this might be involved in its dopaminergic effects. Amantadine can upregulate TH similarly, but as with bromantane, it is unclear whether this is involved in or responsible for its dopaminergic actions. Amantadine is used in the treatment of Parkinson's disease, levodopa-induced dyskinesia, and fatigue in multiple sclerosis. It has also been used in the treatment of disorders of consciousness, disorders of diminished motivation, and brain injuries. The drug is being studied in the treatment of depression and attention deficit hyperactivity disorder (ADHD) as well.

==== Diphenylpiperidines ====
4,4-Diphenylpiperidines including budipine and prodipine are effective in the treatment of Parkinson's disease. Their mechanism of action is unknown but they act as indirect dopaminergic agents. They have distinct effects from other antiparkinsonian agents and dopaminergic drugs.

==== Other miscellaneous agents ====
Aspirin upregulates tyrosine hydroxylase and increases dopamine production.

Others such as hyperforin and adhyperforin (both found in Hypericum perforatum St. John's Wort), L-theanine (found in Camellia sinensis, the tea plant), and S-adenosyl-L-methionine (SAMe).

== See also ==
- Adrenergic
- Cholinergic
- GABAergic
- Histaminergic
- Serotonergic
