= Carbidopa/oxitriptan =

Medication

Carbidopa / oxitriptan

- Carbidopa (top) and oxitriptan (bottom)

Combination of
- Carbidopa: Aromatic L-amino acid decarboxylase inhibitor
- Oxitriptan: Serotonin precursor

Clinical data
- Other names: Carbidopa/5-hydroxytryptophan; Carbidopa/L-5-hydroxytryptophan; Carbidopa/5-HTP; Carbidopa/L-5-HTP; EVX-101; EVX101
- Routes of administration: Oral

Carbidopa/oxitriptan (developmental code name EVX-101), or carbidopa/5-hydroxytryptophan (carbidopa/5-HTP), is a combination of 5-hydroxytryptophan (5-HTP; oxitriptan), a serotonin precursor, and carbidopa, a peripherally selective aromatic L-amino acid decarboxylase (AAAD) inhibitor, which is under development as an add-on therapy for the treatment of obsessive–compulsive disorder (OCD) in people taking a selective serotonin reuptake inhibitor (SSRI). It is or was also under development as an antidepressant for the treatment of depressive disorders in people taking an SSRI or serotonin–norepinephrine reuptake inhibitor (SNRI) with an inadequate treatment response, but no recent development has been reported for this indication.

The drug is taken orally. It is a gastro-retentive sustained-release formulation of 5-HTP (250 mg per tablet) and low-dose carbidopa (0.3125–2.5 mg per tablet). Use of 5-HTP alone is impractical due to poor pharmacokinetics and rapid metabolism. Carbidopa enhances the pharmacokinetics of 5-HTP, for instance greatly increasing its oral bioavailability (with levels increased by ~14-fold). The elimination half-life of 5-HTP in combination with carbidopa was found to be 4.1 to 6.5 hours and was doubled compared to 5-HTP alone. The purpose of carbidopa/oxitriptan add-on therapy is to further increase serotonin levels beyond that provided by an SSRI alone. Circulating cortisol levels increased with the drug, which is a known biomarker for brain serotonin elevation. Carbidopa/oxitriptan is analogous to carbidopa/levodopa, which contains carbidopa and the dopamine precursor levodopa (L-DOPA) and is approved and used to elevate brain dopamine levels to treat Parkinson's disease.

Carbidopa/oxitriptan is under development by Evecxia. As of October 2025, it is in phase 1 clinical trials for OCD, with a phase 2 trial being planned.

Besides for depression and OCD, the combination of 5-HTP with a peripherally selective AAAD inhibitor such as carbidopa or benserazide is being studied for the treatment levodopa-induced dyskinesia in people with Parkinson's disease.

== See also ==
- List of investigational antidepressants
- List of investigational obsessive–compulsive disorder drugs
- Carbidopa/levodopa
