= Monoamine precursor =

Compounds metabolized into monoamines

L-Tryptophan, a precursor of serotonin and melatonin and an example of a monoamine precursor.

Monoamine precursors are precursors of monoamines and monoamine neurotransmitters in the body. The amino acids L-tryptophan and L-5-hydroxytryptophan (5-HTP; oxitriptan) are precursors of serotonin and melatonin, while the amino acids L-phenylalanine, L-tyrosine, and L-DOPA (levodopa) are precursors of dopamine, epinephrine (adrenaline), and norepinephrine (noradrenaline).

Administration of monoamine precursors can increase the levels of monoamine neurotransmitters in the body and brain. Monoamine precursors may be used in combination with peripherally selective aromatic L-amino acid decarboxylase inhibitors (AAAD inhibitors; also known as DOPA decarboxylase (DDC) inhibitors) such as carbidopa and benserazide to restrict metabolism and activation in the periphery. Carbidopa/levodopa and levodopa/benserazide are used to increase brain dopamine levels in the treatment of Parkinson's disease. Carbidopa/oxitriptan (EVX-101), which increases brain serotonin levels, is under development as an antidepressant for possible use in the treatment of depression.

Droxidopa (L-DOPS) is a synthetic precursor or prodrug of norepinephrine used orally in the treatment of certain types of hypotension and other conditions. Dipivefrine is a synthetic precursor or prodrug of epinephrine used as an ophthalmic medication.

== See also ==
- Neurotransmitter prodrug
