= Levodopa =

Dopaminergic medication

- Skeletal formula of levodopa

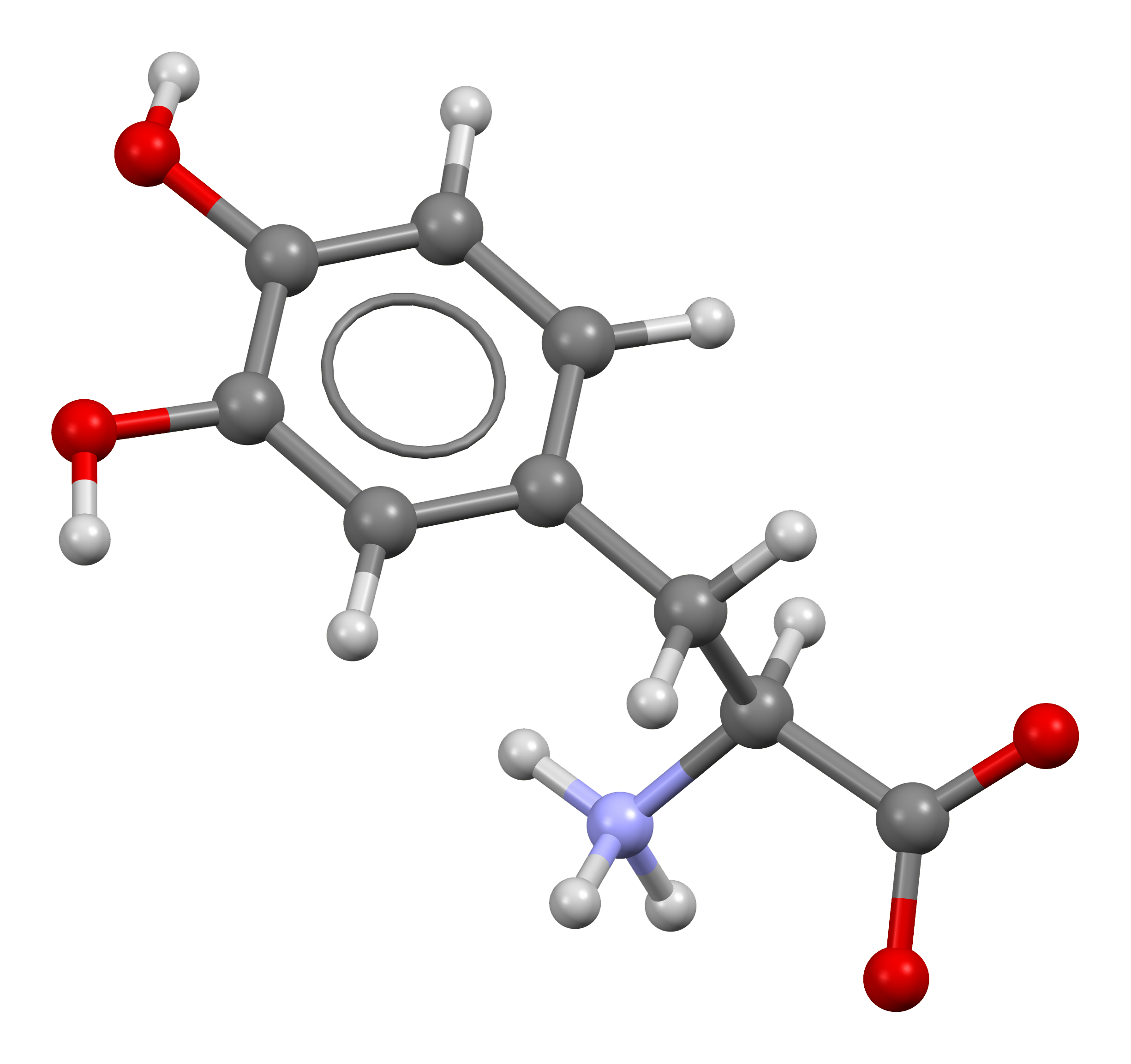
- Ball-and-stick model of the zwitterionic form of levodopa found in the crystal structure

Clinical data
- Pronunciation: /ˌɛlˈdoʊpə/, /ˌlɛvoʊˈdoʊpə/
- Trade names: Larodopa, Dopar, Inbrija, others
- Other names: L-DOPA
- AHFS/Drugs.com: Professional Drug Facts
- MedlinePlus: a619018
- License data: EU EMA: by INN; US DailyMed: Levodopa
- Pregnancy category: AU: B3
- Routes of administration: By mouth, inhalation, enteral (tube), subcutaneous (as foslevodopa)
- Drug class: Dopamine precursor; Dopamine receptor agonist
- ATC code: N04BA01 (WHO)

Legal status
- Legal status: AU: S4 (Prescription only); UK: POM (Prescription only); US: ℞-only (some forms are OTC); EU: Rx-only

Pharmacokinetic data
- Bioavailability: 30%
- Metabolism: Aromatic-l-amino-acid decarboxylase
- Metabolites: • Dopamine
- Elimination half-life: 0.75–1.5 hours
- Excretion: Renal 70–80%

Identifiers
- IUPAC name: (S)-2-Amino-3-(3,4-dihydroxyphenyl)propanoic acid
- CAS Number: 59-92-7
- PubChem CID: 6047
- IUPHAR/BPS: 3639
- DrugBank: DB01235
- ChemSpider: 5824
- UNII: 46627O600J
- KEGG: D00059
- ChEBI: CHEBI:15765
- ChEMBL: ChEMBL1009
- CompTox Dashboard (EPA): DTXSID9023209
- ECHA InfoCard: 100.000.405

Chemical and physical data
- Formula: C_{9}H_{11}NO_{4}
- Molar mass: 197.190 g·mol^{−1}
- 3D model (JSmol): Interactive image
- SMILES: O=C(O)[C@@H](N)Cc1cc(O)c(O)cc1
- InChI: InChI=1S/C9H11NO4/c10-6(9(13)14)3-5-1-2-7(11)8(12)4-5/h1-2,4,6,11-12H,3,10H2,(H,13,14)/t6-/m0/s1; Key:WTDRDQBEARUVNC-LURJTMIESA-N

Levodopa, also known as L-DOPA, is a dopaminergic medication which is used in the treatment of Parkinson's disease (PD) and certain other conditions like dopamine-responsive dystonia and restless legs syndrome. The drug is usually used and formulated in combination with a peripherally selective aromatic L-amino acid decarboxylase (AAAD) inhibitor like carbidopa or benserazide. Levodopa is taken by mouth, by inhalation, through an intestinal tube, or by administration into fat (as foslevodopa).

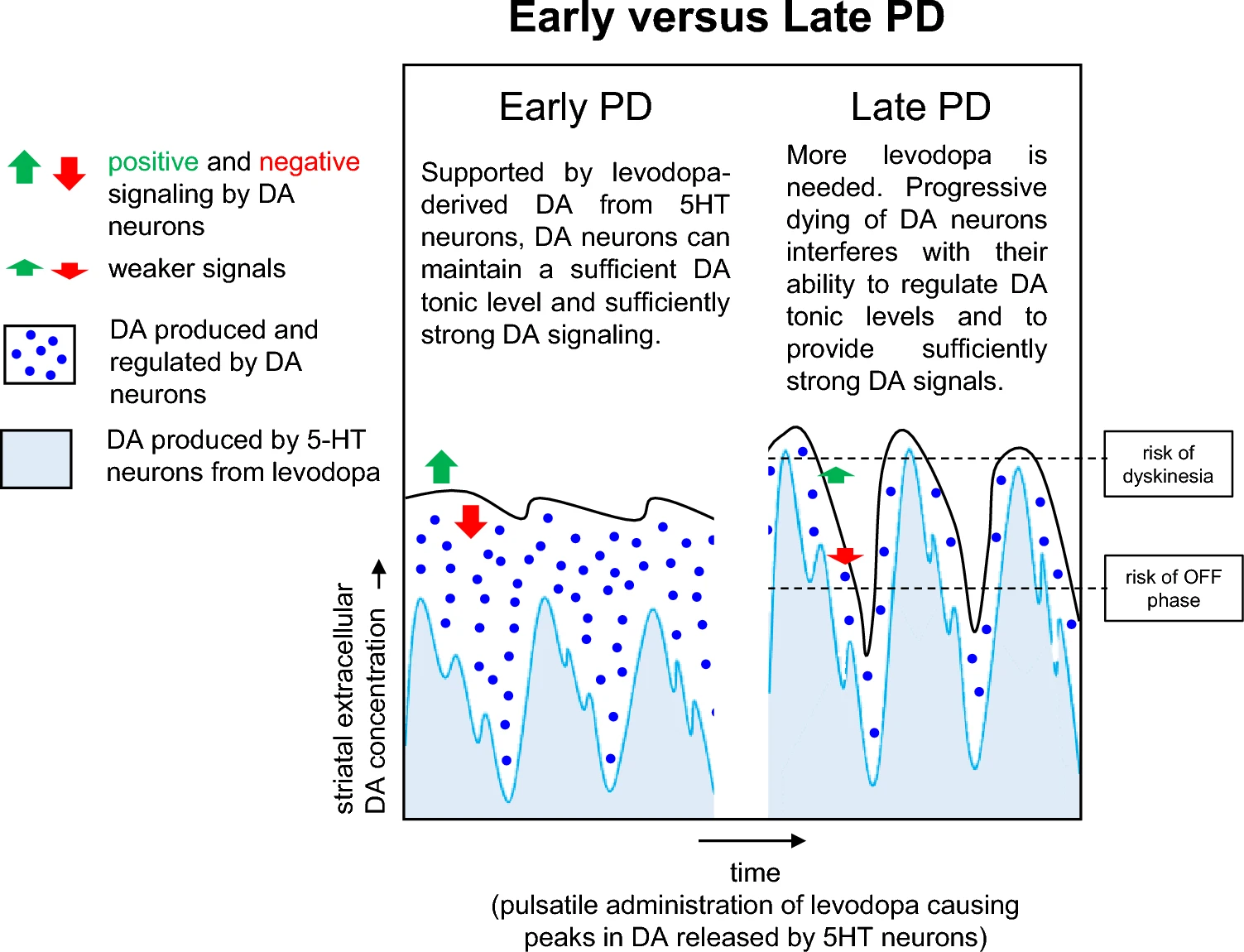

Side effects of levodopa include nausea, the wearing-off phenomenon, dopamine dysregulation syndrome, and levodopa-induced dyskinesia, among others. The drug is a centrally permeable monoamine precursor and prodrug of dopamine and hence acts as a dopamine receptor agonist. Chemically, levodopa is an amino acid, a phenethylamine, and a catecholamine. The major reason for enhanced risks for levodopa-induced dyskinesia (LID) and "off" phases during late PD is the progressive dying of nigrostriatal dopaminergic neurons. This results in the conversion of levodopa into dopamine in serotonergic neurons (which cannot re-uptake dopamine and have no proper regulatory capacity for dopamine synthesis) becoming the major dopamine source in the dorsal striatum, leading to the striatal dopamine concentration following the pulsatile oral administration of levodopa with large fluctuations (see the schematic graph figure). On the other hand, in a disease like Segawa syndrome, in which dopamine synthesis is low but without progressive degeneration of dopaminergic neurons, lifelong administration of low doses of levodopa is believed to be without serious side effects.

Levodopa was first synthesized and isolated in the early 1910s. The antiparkinsonian effects of levodopa were discovered in the 1950s and 1960s. Following this, it was introduced for the treatment of Parkinson's disease in 1970.

== Medical uses ==
Levodopa crosses the protective blood–brain barrier, whereas dopamine itself cannot. Thus, levodopa is used to increase dopamine concentrations in the treatment of Parkinson's disease, parkinsonism, dopamine-responsive dystonia, and Parkinson-plus syndrome. The therapeutic efficacy is different for different kinds of symptoms. Bradykinesia and rigidity are the most responsive symptoms while tremors are less responsive to levodopa therapy. Speech, swallowing disorders, postural instability, and freezing gait are the least responsive symptoms.

Once levodopa has entered the central nervous system, it is converted into dopamine by the enzyme aromatic l-amino acid decarboxylase (AAAD), also known as DOPA decarboxylase (DDC). Pyridoxal phosphate (vitamin B_{6}) is a required cofactor in this reaction, and may occasionally be administered along with levodopa, usually in the form of pyridoxine. Because levodopa bypasses the enzyme tyrosine hydroxylase, the rate-limiting step in dopamine synthesis, it is much more readily converted to dopamine than tyrosine, which is normally the natural precursor for dopamine production.

In humans, conversion of levodopa to dopamine does not only occur within the central nervous system. Cells in the peripheral nervous system perform the same task. Thus administering levodopa alone will lead to increased dopamine signaling in the periphery as well. Excessive peripheral dopamine signaling is undesirable as it causes many of the adverse side effects seen with sole levodopa administration. To bypass these effects, it is standard clinical practice to co-administer levodopa with a peripheral DOPA decarboxylase inhibitor (DDCI) such as carbidopa to prevent the peripheral synthesis of dopamine from levodopa. However, when consumed as a botanical extract, for example from Mucuna pruriens supplements, a peripheral DOPA decarboxylase inhibitor is not present.

Inbrija (previously known as CVT-301) is an inhaled powder formulation of levodopa indicated for the intermittent treatment of "off episodes" in patients with Parkinson's disease currently taking carbidopa/levodopa. It was approved by the US Food and Drug Administration (FDA) on 21 December 2018, and is marketed by Acorda Therapeutics.

Coadministration of pyridoxine without a DDCI accelerates the peripheral decarboxylation of levodopa to such an extent that it negates the effects of levodopa administration, a phenomenon that historically caused great confusion.

In addition, levodopa, co-administered with a peripheral DDCI, is efficacious for the short-term treatment of restless legs syndrome.

The two types of response seen with administration of levodopa are:

- The short-duration response is related to the half-life of the drug.
- The longer-duration response depends on the accumulation of effects over at least two weeks, during which ΔFosB accumulates in nigrostriatal neurons. In the treatment of Parkinson's disease, this response stays stable up to 10 years.

=== Available forms ===
Levodopa is available, alone or in combination with carbidopa, in the form of immediate-release oral tablets and capsules, extended-release oral tablets and capsules, orally disintegrating tablets, as a powder for inhalation, and as an enteral suspension or gel (via intestinal tube). In terms of combination formulations, it is available with carbidopa (as carbidopa/levodopa), with benserazide (as levodopa/benserazide), and with both carbidopa and entacapone (as carbidopa/levodopa/entacapone). In addition to levodopa itself, certain prodrugs of levodopa are available, including melevodopa (melevodopa/carbidopa) (used orally) and foslevodopa (foscarbidopa/foslevodopa) (used subcutaneously).

== Side effects ==
The side effects of levodopa may include:

- Hypertension, especially if the dosage is too high
- Arrhythmias, although these are uncommon
- Nausea, which is often reduced by taking the drug with food, although protein reduces drug absorption. Levodopa is an amino acid, so protein competitively inhibits levodopa absorption.
- Gastrointestinal bleeding
- Disturbed respiration, which is not always harmful, and can actually benefit patients with upper airway obstruction
- Hair loss
- Disorientation and confusion
- Extreme emotional states, particularly anxiety, but also excessive libido
- Vivid dreams or insomnia
- Auditory or visual hallucinations
- Effects on learning; some evidence indicates it improves working memory, while impairing other complex functions
- Somnolence and narcolepsy
- A condition similar to stimulant psychosis

Although many adverse effects are associated with levodopa, in particular psychiatric ones, it has fewer than other antiparkinsonian agents, such as anticholinergics and dopamine receptor agonists.

More serious are the effects of chronic levodopa administration in the treatment of Parkinson's disease, which include:

- End-of-dose deterioration of function
- "On/off" oscillations
- Freezing during movement
- Dose failure (drug resistance)
- Dyskinesia at peak dose (levodopa-induced dyskinesia)
- Possible dopamine dysregulation: The long-term use of levodopa in Parkinson's disease has been linked to the so-called dopamine dysregulation syndrome.

Rapidly decreasing the dose of levodopa can result in neuroleptic malignant syndrome.

Clinicians try to avoid these side effects and adverse reactions by limiting levodopa doses as much as possible until absolutely necessary.

Metabolites of dopamine, such as DOPAL, are known to be dopaminergic neurotoxins. The long term use of levodopa increases oxidative stress through monoamine oxidase led enzymatic degradation of synthesized dopamine causing neuronal damage and cytotoxicity. The oxidative stress is caused by the formation of reactive oxygen species (H_{2}O_{2}) during the monoamine oxidase led metabolism of dopamine. It is further perpetuated by the richness of Fe^{2+} ions in striatum via the Fenton reaction and intracellular autooxidation. The increased oxidation can potentially cause mutations in DNA due to the formation of 8-oxoguanine, which is capable of pairing with adenosine during mitosis. See also the catecholaldehyde hypothesis.

== Pharmacology ==
=== Pharmacodynamics ===
Levodopa is a dopamine precursor and prodrug of dopamine and hence acts as a non-selective dopamine receptor agonist, including of the D_{1}-like receptors (D_{1}, D_{5}) and the D_{2}-like receptors (D_{2}, D_{3}, D_{4}).

=== Pharmacokinetics ===
The bioavailability of levodopa is 30%. It is metabolized into dopamine by aromatic-l-amino-acid decarboxylase (AAAD) in the central nervous system and periphery. The elimination half-life of levodopa is 0.75 to 1.5 hours. It is excreted 70–80% in urine.

== Chemistry ==
Levodopa is an amino acid and a substituted phenethylamine and catecholamine.

Analogues and prodrugs of levodopa include melevodopa, etilevodopa, foslevodopa, and XP-21279. Some of these, like melevodopa and foslevodopa, are approved for the treatment of Parkinson's disease similarly to levodopa.

Other analogues include methyldopa, an antihypertensive agent, and droxidopa (L-DOPS), a norepinephrine precursor and prodrug.

6-Hydroxydopa, a prodrug of 6-hydroxydopamine (6-OHDA), is a potent dopaminergic neurotoxin used in scientific research.

== History ==
Levodopa was first synthesized in 1911 by Torquato Torquati from the Vicia faba bean. It was first isolated in 1913 by Marcus Guggenheim from the V. faba bean. Guggenheim tried levodopa at a dose of 2.5 g and thought that it was inactive aside from nausea and vomiting.

In work that earned him a Nobel Prize in 2000, Swedish scientist Arvid Carlsson first showed in the 1950s that administering levodopa to animals with drug-induced (reserpine) Parkinsonian symptoms caused a reduction in the intensity of the animals' symptoms. In 1960 or 1961 Oleh Hornykiewicz, after discovering greatly reduced levels of dopamine in autopsied brains of patients with Parkinson's disease, published together with the neurologist Walther Birkmayer dramatic therapeutic antiparkinson effects of intravenously administered levodopa in patients. This treatment was later extended to manganese poisoning and later parkinsonism by George Cotzias and his coworkers, who used greatly increased oral doses, for which they won the 1969 Lasker Prize. The first study reporting improvements in patients with Parkinson's disease resulting from treatment with levodopa was published in 1968.

Levodopa was first marketed in 1970 by Roche under the brand name Larodopa.

The neurologist Oliver Sacks describes this treatment in human patients with encephalitis lethargica in his 1973 book Awakenings, upon which the 1990 movie of the same name is based.

Carbidopa was added to levodopa in 1974 and this improved its tolerability.

== Society and culture ==
=== Names ===
Levodopa is the generic name of the drug and its INN, USAN, USP, BAN, DCF, DCIT, and JAN.

== Research ==
=== Continuous and individualized delivery systems ===
As Parkinson's disease advances, the duration, efficacy and reliability of levodopa progressively decline producing unstable plasma concentration and motor fluctuations. The fluctuations contribute to a series of motor and non-motor complications including wearing off and levodopa induced dyskinesia that need a better tailored pharmaceutical approach to the disease. A steady activation of the dopaminergic receptors was initially pursued through intravenous infusion which shortly was replaced by a series of new levodopa device-aided formulations.

Duodopa or Levodopa-carbidopa intestinal gel (LCIG) is a methylcellulose-based suspension of levodopa and carbidopa delivered in a continuous way into the duodenum or jejunum through a portable pump and a PEG-J tube system. In randomized studies, LCIG proved to reduce daily "off" time and increase "on" time without troublesome dyskinesia but, at the same time, carries with it problems related to the infusion system, such as PEG-J and stoma complications.

Produodopa is a soluble prodrug formulation of fosfolevodopa/foscarbidopa developed for a 24 hour subcutaneous infusion. After the infusion, the prodrug is converted by phosphatases into active levodopa and carbidopa that manage to stabilize their concentration in the blood. Compared with levodopa/carbidopa, the prodrug approach increases "on" time without troublesome dyskinesia by 1.75 hours and reduced "off" time by 1.79 hours other than improvements also in quality of life, motor fluctuations and sleep. Its main adverse effects are linked to infusion-site reactions which, even though mild to moderate, are responsible for early discontinuation.

Levodopa-carbidopa microtablets (LC-5), marketed as Flexilev, are small dispersible low-dose tablets consisting of 5 mg levodopa and 1.25 mg carbidopa per tablet. The tablets are designed for frequent oral dosing throughout the day in order to maintain stable levodopa concentrations in the blood via fine granularity. Pharmacokinetic studies demonstrated the bioequivalence of LC-5 to standard levodopa/carbidopa tablets and showed that fractionated administration reduce the fluctuations of plasmatic levodopa while keeping high adherence, symptoms improvement and lower cost estimates. Because the main challenge for the patients using LC-5 is linked to the intake of frequent small doses which can be impractical, the microtablets are paired with a device for their administration. The first device was an electronic dispenser with touch-screen called MyFID, loaded with 750 microtablets in a cassette and capable of notifying the patients with alerts. The new completely mechanic device, OraFID, is pre-filled with 2250 microtablets and enables accurate dosing.

=== Depression ===
Levodopa has been reported to be inconsistently effective as an antidepressant in the treatment of depressive disorders. However, it was found to enhance psychomotor activation in people with depression.

=== Motivational disorders ===
Levodopa has been found to increase the willingness to exert effort for rewards in humans and hence appears to show pro-motivational effects. Other dopaminergic agents have also shown pro-motivational effects and may be useful in the treatment of motivational disorders.

=== Age-related macular degeneration ===
In 2015, a retrospective analysis comparing the incidence of age-related macular degeneration (AMD) between patients taking versus not taking levodopa found that the drug delayed onset of AMD by around 8 years. The authors state that significant effects were obtained for both dry and wet AMD.
