= Carbidopa/levodopa/entacapone =

Parkinson's disease medication

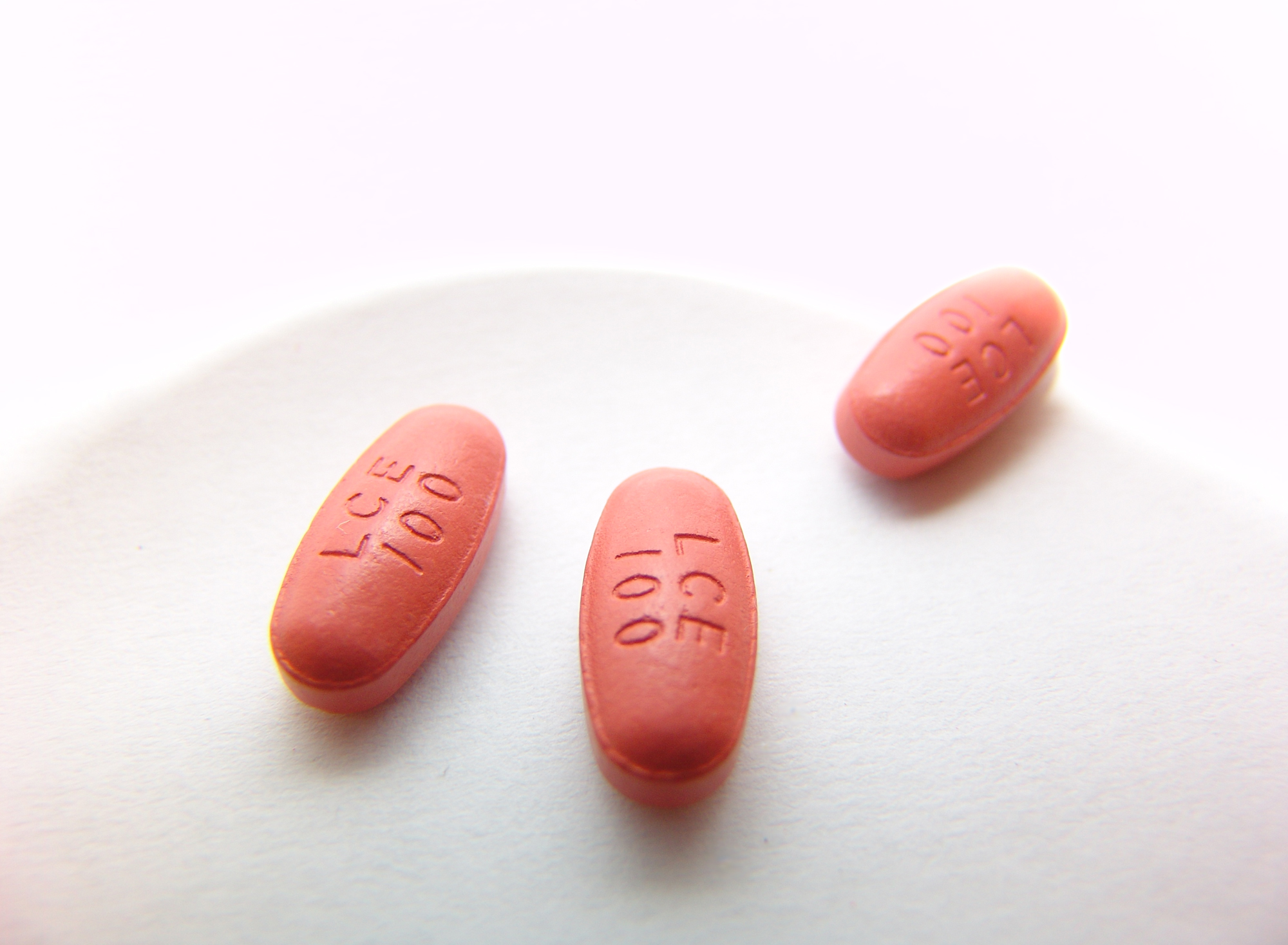

Combination of
- Carbidopa: DOPA decarboxylase inhibitor
- Levodopa: dopamine precursor
- Entacapone: catechol-O-methyltransferase inhibitor

Clinical data
- Trade names: Stalevo, others
- AHFS/Drugs.com: Professional Drug Facts
- MedlinePlus: a601068
- License data: US DailyMed: Stalevo
- Pregnancy category: AU: B3
- Routes of administration: oral, subcutaneous, intravenous, intrajejunal infusion
- ATC code: N04BA03 (WHO)

Legal status
- Legal status: AU: S4 (Prescription only); UK: POM (Prescription only); US: ℞-only; EU: Rx-only; In general: ℞ (Prescription only)

Identifiers
- CAS Number: 745835-09-0
- PubChem CID: 10550026
- ChemSpider: none
- KEGG: D10293

Carbidopa/levodopa/entacapone, sold under the brand name Stalevo among others, is a dopaminergic fixed-dose combination medication that contains carbidopa, an inhibitor of aromatic amino acid decarboxylation; levodopa, an aromatic amino acid; and entacapone, an inhibitor of catechol-O-methyltransferase for the treatment of Parkinson's disease.

== Medical uses ==
In the United States, carbidopa/levodopa/entacapone is indicated for the treatment of Parkinson's disease.

In the European Union it is indicated for the treatment of adults with Parkinson's disease and end-of-dose motor fluctuations not stabilized on levodopa/dopa decarboxylase inhibitor treatment.

== Side effects ==
The most common adverse reactions include dyskinesias, hyperkinesia, diarrhea, nausea, abdominal pain, vomiting, dry mouth, and urine discoloration.

In 2015, the US Food and Drug Administration found no evidence of increased risk of heart attacks, stroke, or other cardiovascular events from using entacapone with carbidopa and levodopa for Parkinson's disease. A 2019 FDA review also reported no increased risk of prostate cancer with this treatment.

== Drug interactions ==
It is contraindicated in people taking a class of antidepressant drugs known as non-selective monoamine oxidase (MAO) inhibitors such as phenelzine and tranylcypromine.

It may be combined with the drugs rasagiline or selegiline. These drugs are a different type of MAO inhibitor known as selective MAO inhibitors that are often prescribed for Parkinson's disease. Many drug interactions involving selegiline are theoretical, primarily based on interactions with non-selective MAO inhibitors; at oral doses the risk of these interactions may be very low. However, transdermal selegiline, known by its trade name Emsam, is still contraindicated. Transdermal selegiline results in higher plasma levels at which it behaves like a non-selective MAO inhibitor.

Concominant use of entacapone, a component of carbidopa/levodopa/entacapone, with MAO inhibitors may increase toxicity of MAO inhibitors. Levodopa, also a component of carbidopa/levodopa/entacapone, in combination with MAO inhibitors may result in hypertensive reactions.

Iron salts or multivitamins containing iron should be administered with caution. They can form chelates with levodopa, carbidopa, and entacapone, which may reduce the bioavailability of these medications.

== Mechanism of action ==
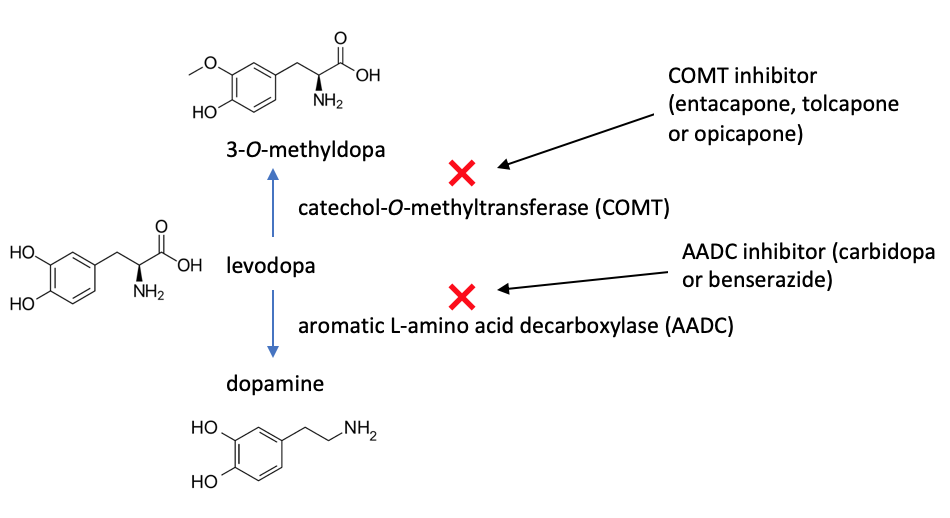
Carbidopa/levodopa/entercapone's pathway

Levodopa can cross the blood-brain barrier and it serves as the immediate precursor to dopamine, which cannot cross the barrier. Once levodopa enters the brain, it is converted to dopamine by the enzyme called aromatic L-amino acid decarboxylase (AADC), or to 3-O-methyldopa by catechol-O-methyltransferase.

Carbidopa is an inhibitor of AADC and does not cross the blood-brain barrier. As a result, it does not influence levodopa metabolism in the central nervous system. By inhibiting AADC, carbidopa prevents the conversion of levodopa to dopamine in the peripheral nervous system, allowing a larger amount of levodopa to reach the central nervous system.

== History ==
=== Legal status ===
Carbidopa/levodopa/entacapone was approved for medical use in the United States in June 2003. Levodopa-entacapone-carbidopa intestinal gel (LECIG) was first approved in Sweden in 2018, followed by Denmark, Finland, and Norway in 2019, Austria, Belgium, Germany, the Netherlands, Romania, and Slovenia in 2020.
