= Etilevodopa =

Chemical compound

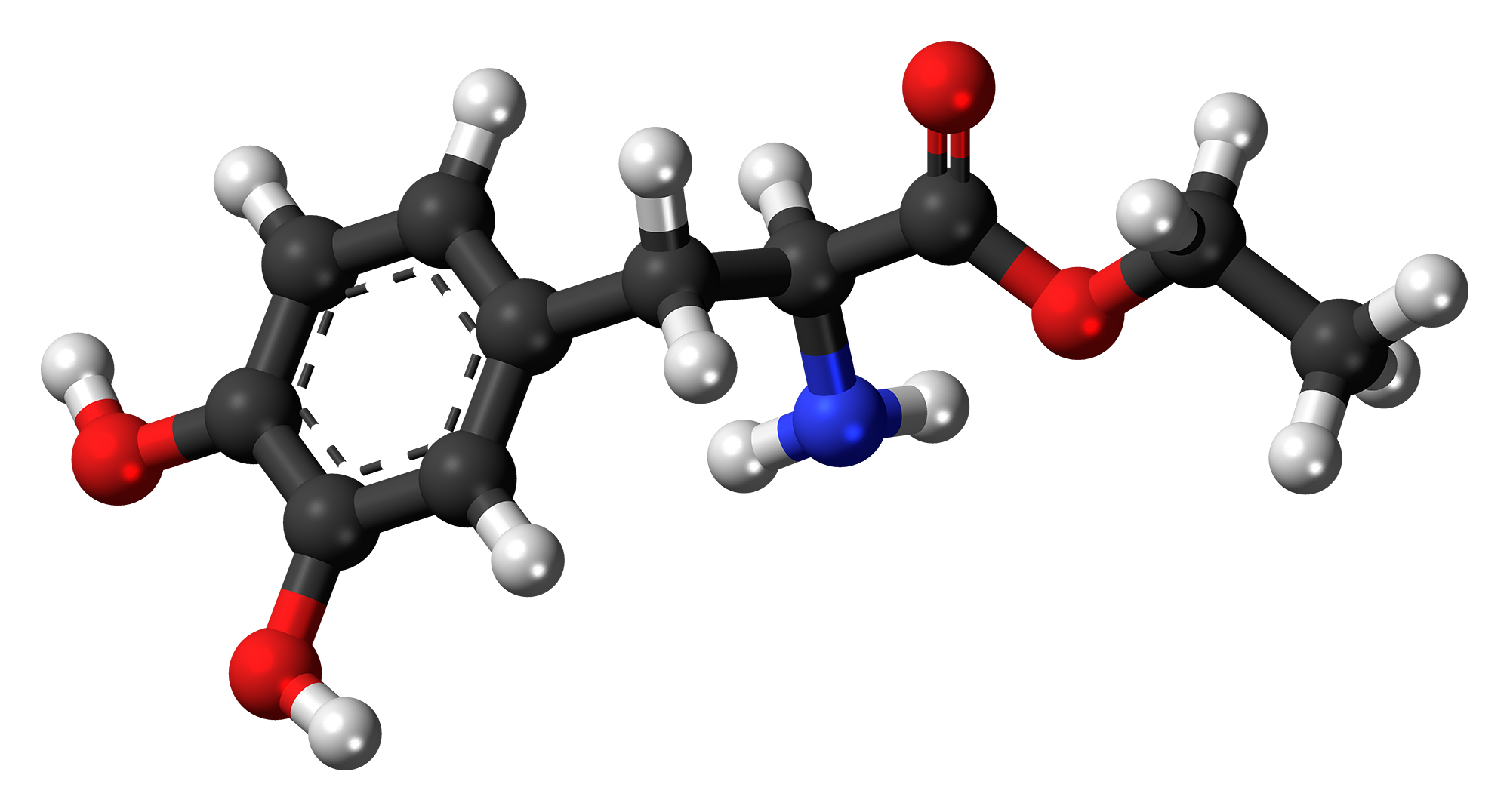

Clinical data
- Other names: TV-1203; Levodopa ethyl ester; L-DOPA ethyl ester
- ATC code: N04BA06 (WHO) (combination with decarboxylase inhibitor)

Identifiers
- IUPAC name: ethyl (2S)-2-amino-3-(3,4-dihydroxyphenyl)propanoate
- CAS Number: 37178-37-3
- PubChem CID: 170345
- ChemSpider: 148944
- UNII: 895X917GYE
- KEGG: D04097
- CompTox Dashboard (EPA): DTXSID10905092
- ECHA InfoCard: 100.223.003

Chemical and physical data
- Formula: C_{11}H_{15}NO_{4}
- Molar mass: 225.244 g·mol^{−1}
- 3D model (JSmol): Interactive image
- SMILES: O=C(OCC)[C@@H](N)Cc1cc(O)c(O)cc1
- InChI: InChI=1S/C11H15NO4/c1-2-16-11(15)8(12)5-7-3-4-9(13)10(14)6-7/h3-4,6,8,13-14H,2,5,12H2,1H3/t8-/m0/s1; Key:NULMGOSOSZBEQL-QMMMGPOBSA-N

Etilevodopa (developmental code name TV-1203) is a dopaminergic agent which was developed as a treatment for Parkinson's disease. It is the ethyl ester of levodopa. It was never marketed.

== See also ==
- Melevodopa
- Foslevodopa
- XP-21279
