= Melevodopa =

Chemical compound

Clinical data
- Trade names: Levomet
- Other names: Levodopa methyl ester; L-DOPA methyl ester; LDME; CHF-1301
- ATC code: N04BA04 (WHO)

Identifiers
- IUPAC name: methyl (2S)-2-amino-3-(3,4-dihydroxyphenyl)propanoate
- CAS Number: 7101-51-1
- PubChem CID: 23497
- ChemSpider: 21968
- UNII: M30686U4X4
- KEGG: D07304
- CompTox Dashboard (EPA): DTXSID9048433

Chemical and physical data
- Formula: C_{10}H_{13}NO_{4}
- Molar mass: 211.217 g·mol^{−1}
- 3D model (JSmol): Interactive image
- SMILES: O=C(OC)[C@@H](N)Cc1cc(O)c(O)cc1
- InChI: InChI=1S/C10H13NO4/c1-15-10(14)7(11)4-6-2-3-8(12)9(13)5-6/h2-3,5,7,12-13H,4,11H2,1H3/t7-/m0/s1; Key:XBBDACCLCFWBSI-ZETCQYMHSA-N

Melevodopa, also known as levodopa methyl ester (LDME) and sold under the brand name Levomet, is a dopaminergic agent. It is the methyl ester of levodopa. It is used in oral tablet form as an effervescent prodrug with 250 times the water solubility of tablet levodopa. In combination with carbidopa, as melevodopa/carbidopa (brand name Sirio), it is approved for use in the treatment of Parkinson's disease.

== See also ==
- Etilevodopa
- Foslevodopa
- XP-21279
