= Foscarbidopa/foslevodopa =

Combination medication

- Chemical structure of foscarbidopa

- Chemical structure of foslevodopa

Combination of
- Foscarbidopa: Aromatic amino acid decarboxylation inhibitor
- Foslevodopa: Aromatic amino acid

Clinical data
- Trade names: Vyalev, others
- Other names: ABBV-951
- License data: US DailyMed: Foscarbidopa/foslevodopa
- Pregnancy category: AU: B3
- Routes of administration: Subcutaneous
- ATC code: N04BA07 (WHO)

Legal status
- Legal status: AU: S4 (Prescription only); CA: ℞-only; US: ℞-only

Identifiers
- KEGG: D12494

Foscarbidopa/foslevodopa, sold under the brand name Vyalev among others, is a fixed-dose combination medication used for the treatment of Parkinson's disease. It is a fixed-dose combination of foscarbidopa, an aromatic amino acid decarboxylation inhibitor and prodrug for carbidopa; and foslevodopa, an aromatic amino acid and prodrug for levodopa that was developed by AbbVie. Its structure is identical to carbidopa/levodopa except for the replacement of a hydroxyl on each molecule with a phosphate group, similar to the antiepileptic prodrug fosphenytoin as it relates to phenytoin.

The combination was refused approval by the US Food and Drug Administration (FDA) in 2023. It was approved for medical use in Canada in May 2023, in Australia in March 2024, and in the United States in October 2024.

Produodopa uses a pump to steadily release foscarbidopa/foslevodopa into the bloodstream round-the-clock. It is available via the UK National Health Service since February 2024.

== Medical uses ==
The combination of foscarbidopa and foslevodopa is indicated for the treatment of motor fluctuations in adults with advanced Parkinson's disease.

== Side effects ==
The most common adverse reactions include infusion/catheter site reactions, infusion/catheter site infections, hallucinations, and dyskinesia.
