= XP-21279 =

Sustained-release levodopa prodrug

Clinical data
- Other names: XP21279
- Routes of administration: Oral
- Drug class: Dopamine precursor; Dopamine receptor agonist

Identifiers
- IUPAC name: [(2R)-1-[(2S)-2-Amino-3-(3,4-dihydroxyphenyl)propanoyl]oxypropan-2-yl] benzoate
- CAS Number: 1426325-45-2
- PubChem CID: 11559525
- DrugBank: DB06319
- ChemSpider: 9734299
- ChEMBL: ChEMBL4763200

Chemical and physical data
- Formula: C_{19}H_{21}NO_{6}
- Molar mass: 359.378 g·mol^{−1}
- 3D model (JSmol): Interactive image
- SMILES: C[C@H](COC(=O)[C@H](CC1=CC(=C(C=C1)O)O)N)OC(=O)C2=CC=CC=C2
- InChI: InChI=1S/C19H21NO6/c1-12(26-18(23)14-5-3-2-4-6-14)11-25-19(24)15(20)9-13-7-8-16(21)17(22)10-13/h2-8,10,12,15,21-22H,9,11,20H2,1H3/t12-,15+/m1/s1; Key:AKUWZLYXAADOTQ-DOMZBBRYSA-N

XP-21279 is a sustained-release levodopa (L-DOPA) prodrug and hence a dopamine precursor and non-selective dopamine receptor agonist which was under development for the treatment of Parkinson's disease. It is taken by mouth.

== Pharmacology ==
The drug is said to add a five-carbon ester conjugate to levodopa that allows it to be actively transported by high-capacity nutrient transporters throughout the entire gastrointestinal tract. Subsequently, it is rapidly converted into levodopa by carboxylesterases. Levodopa itself can only be transported by a short section of the small intestine and hence XP-21279 allows more time for levodopa to be absorbed, in turn resulting in an increased duration and possibly reduced fluctuations in dopamine levels between levodopa doses.

== Clinical studies ==
As of June 2015, XP-21279 was in phase 2 clinical trials. As of May 2022, there have been no further developmental updates. It was reported in 2018 that development of the drug had been discontinued several years prior. A 2019 review reported that results were conflicting in phase 2 trials and that this likely resulted in the discontinuation of the drug's development.

== Chemistry ==
Many sources do not report the chemical structure of XP-21279, suggesting that its exact structure has not been disclosed. However, one source appears to report its chemical structure.

== See also ==
- Etilevodopa
- Foslevodopa
- Melevodopa
