= Jerome B. Posner =

American neurologist

Jerome B. Posner (born 1932) is an American neurologist, known as co-author of Plum and Posner's Diagnosis of Stupor and Coma.

Posner graduated from the University of Washington with a Bachelor of Science in 1951 and continued there to pursue a degree in medicine which was awarded in 1955. He has served as chief of the Neuro-Psychiatry Service of the Department of Medicine, chair of the Department of Neurology and currently occupies the George Cotzias Chair of Neuro-Oncology and is professor of neurology and neuroscience at Cornell University Medical College. He is a member of the Institute of Medicine and served on the advisory council of the National Institute of Neurological Diseases and Stroke (NINDS). Dr. Posner is also well known for his current research on paraneoplastic disease at Memorial Sloan-Kettering Cancer Center where he has been a faculty member since 1967.

Along with his contemporary, Fred Plum, he helped to developed guidelines to help determine how to best treat comatose patients, writing The Diagnosis of Stupor and Coma in 1966, a work described by neurologist Marcus Raichle as having "put stupor and coma on the map as an important consideration in neurology".
