= AAADC =

AAADC may refer to:

- Aromatic L-amino acid decarboxylase
- American-Arab Anti-Discrimination Committee
