= Fred Plum =

American neurologist (1924–2010)

Fred Plum (January 10, 1924 – June 11, 2010) was an American neurologist who developed the terms "persistent vegetative state" and "locked-in syndrome" as part of his continuing research on consciousness and comas and care of the comatose.

== Biography ==
Plum was born in Atlantic City, New Jersey on January 10, 1924. His father, Frederick Plum, a champion trapshooter and owner of a chain of drug stores, died when Plum was eight years old. Plum chose to pursue a career in neurology after his sister died of poliomyelitis while he was a teenager. He earned his undergraduate degree from Dartmouth College in 1944 and was awarded his medical degree from the Cornell University School of Medicine in 1947. His first published paper was co-written with future Nobel Prize winner Dr. Vincent du Vigneaud.

Plum worked in the US Naval Hospital in St. Albans, Queens, NY during the Korean War. He was named head of the department of neurology at the University of Washington in 1953, making him the youngest chief in the institution's history. There he created a respiratory center to help treat patients who were unconscious or comatose, including those who had suffered drug overdoses. Using the limited clinical tools available at the time, Plum developed guidelines to help determine how to best treat comatose patients, writing The Diagnosis of Stupor and Coma in 1966, together with his longtime research partner Dr. Jerome B. Posner, a work described by neurologist Marcus E. Raichle as having "put stupor and coma on the map as an important consideration in neurology".

Working together with Glasgow neurosurgeon Dr. Bryan Jennett, Plum developed the Glasgow Coma Scale, as an objective way of documenting and monitoring the conscious state of a patient based on eye motion, and motor and verbal responses. Together with Jennett, he coined the term "persistent vegetative state" to describe patients with severe brain damage who were in a coma, and had the appearance of being conscious without any detectable awareness. Plum testified as an expert witness in the 1975 Karen Ann Quinlan case.

Plum later coined the term "locked-in syndrome" to describe a condition in which a patient is aware and awake but cannot move or communicate due to complete paralysis of most voluntary muscles in the body except for the eyes.

Plum advocated that people should prepare an advance health care directive, or "living will", to help guide their treatment in the event that they are not able to make medical care decisions due to illness or incapacity. Plum treated Richard Nixon before his death in 1994, and credited Nixon's living will with allowing the former President to control his course of treatment with authority over how decisions were made at the end of his life.

== Death ==
A resident of Manhattan, Plum died at age 86 in a hospice there on June 11, 2010, due to primary progressive aphasia, a form of dementia similar to Alzheimer's disease. He was survived by his second wife, Susan, as well as by a daughter, Carol, and two sons, Michael and Christopher (married to Maureen B. Cavanaugh), from his first marriage to Jean Houston (died in 1999).
