= Α-Difluoromethyl-DOPA =

α-Difluoromethyl-DOPA
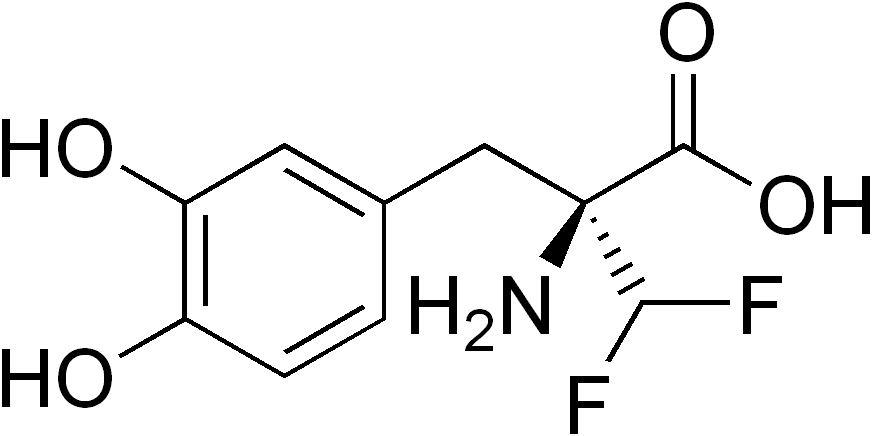

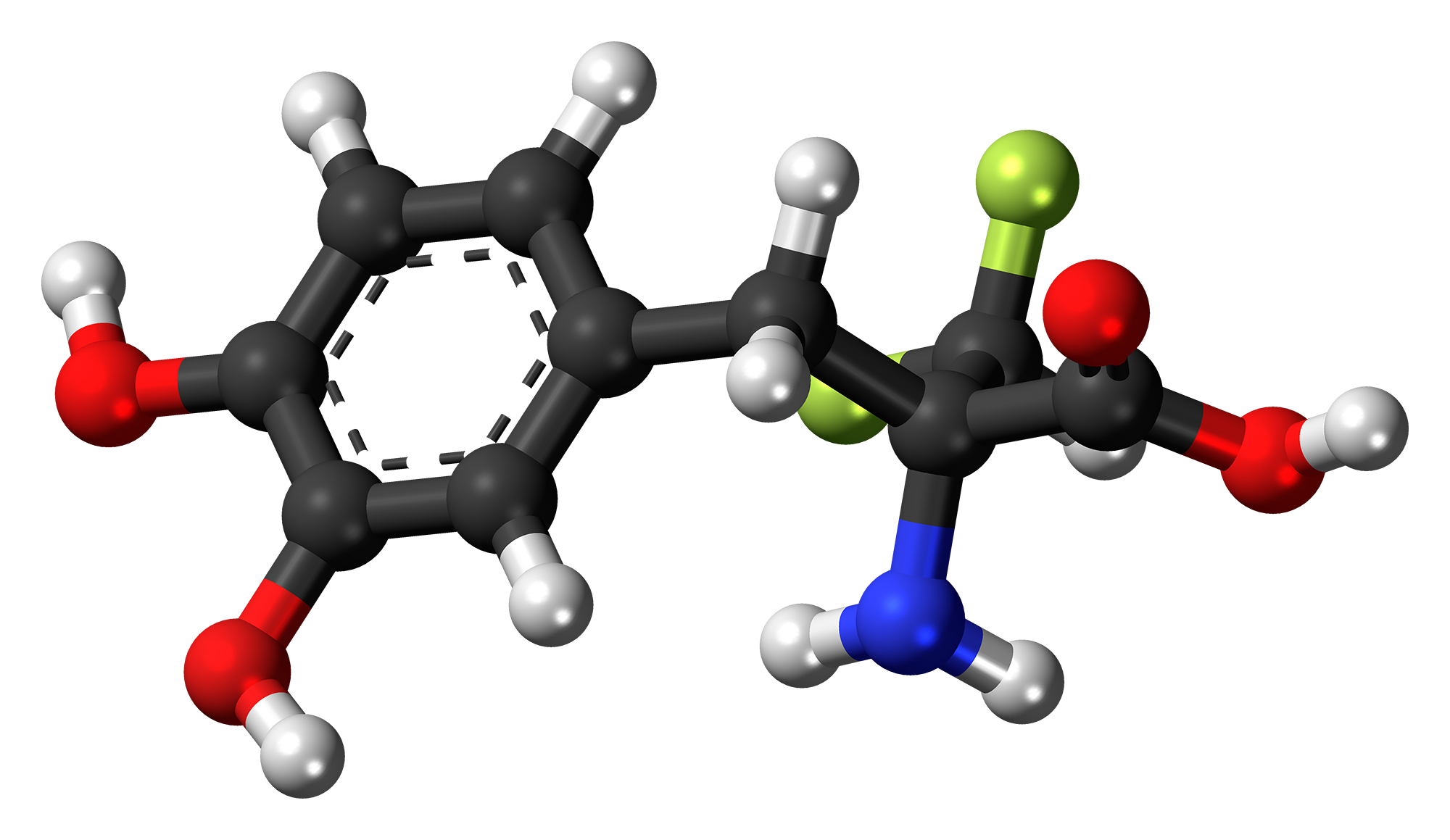

Names
- Systematic IUPAC name (2S)-2-Amino-2-[(3,4-dihydroxyphenyl)methyl]-3,3-difluoropropanoic acid
- Other names α-(Difluoromethyl)-3-hydroxy-L-tyrosine

Identifiers
CAS Number	160401-53-6
3D model (JSmol)	Interactive image; Interactive image
ChemSpider	114812
MeSH	alpha-difluoromethyl-DOPA
PubChem CID	129677
UNII	4FX102BRL6
CompTox Dashboard (EPA)	DTXSID70220233
- InChI: InChI=1S/C10H11F2NO4/c11-8(12)10(13,9(16)17)4-5-1-2-6(14)7(15)3-5/h1-3,8,14-15H,4,13H2,(H,16,17)/t10-/m1/s1 Key: XZVHHLNLLVICFA-SNVBAGLBSA-N; InChI=1/C10H11F2NO4/c11-8(12)10(13,9(16)17)4-5-1-2-6(14)7(15)3-5/h1-3,8,14-15H,4,13H2,(H,16,17)/t10-/m1/s1 Key: XZVHHLNLLVICFA-SNVBAGLBBM
- SMILES: C1=CC(=C(C=C1C[C@@](C(F)F)(C(=O)O)N)O)O; FC(F)[C@](C(=O)O)(N)Cc1cc(O)c(O)cc1

Properties
Chemical formula	C_{10}H_{11}F_{2}NO_{4}
Molar mass	247.20 g/mol
Density	1.528 g/mL
Boiling point	479 °C (894 °F; 752 K)
- Except where otherwise noted, data are given for materials in their standard state (at 25 °C [77 °F], 100 kPa). verify (what is ?) Infobox references

α-Difluoromethyl-3,4-dihydroxyphenylalanine (DFMD, DFM-DOPA) is a DOPA decarboxylase inhibitor.

== See also ==
- Carbidopa
- Methyldopa
