= Augmentation (pharmacology) =

Combination of multiple drugs to improve treatment

Augmentation, in the context of the pharmacological management of psychiatry, refers to the combination of two or more drugs to achieve better treatment results. Examples include:

- Prescribing an atypical antipsychotic when someone is already taking a selective serotonin reuptake inhibitor for the treatment of depression.
- Prescribing estrogen for someone already being treated with antipsychotics for the management of schizophrenia.
- Giving an adenosine A2A receptor antagonist on top of existing treatment for Parkinson's disease.

In pharmacology, the term is occasionally used to describe treatments that increase (augment) the concentration of some substance in the body. This might be done when someone is deficient in a hormone, enzyme, or other endogenous substance. For example:

- Use of DDCIs in addition to L-DOPA, to reduce conversion of L-DOPA outside the brain.
- To give α1 antitrypsin to someone with alpha 1-antitrypsin deficiency.
