= 5-Hydroxytryptophan =

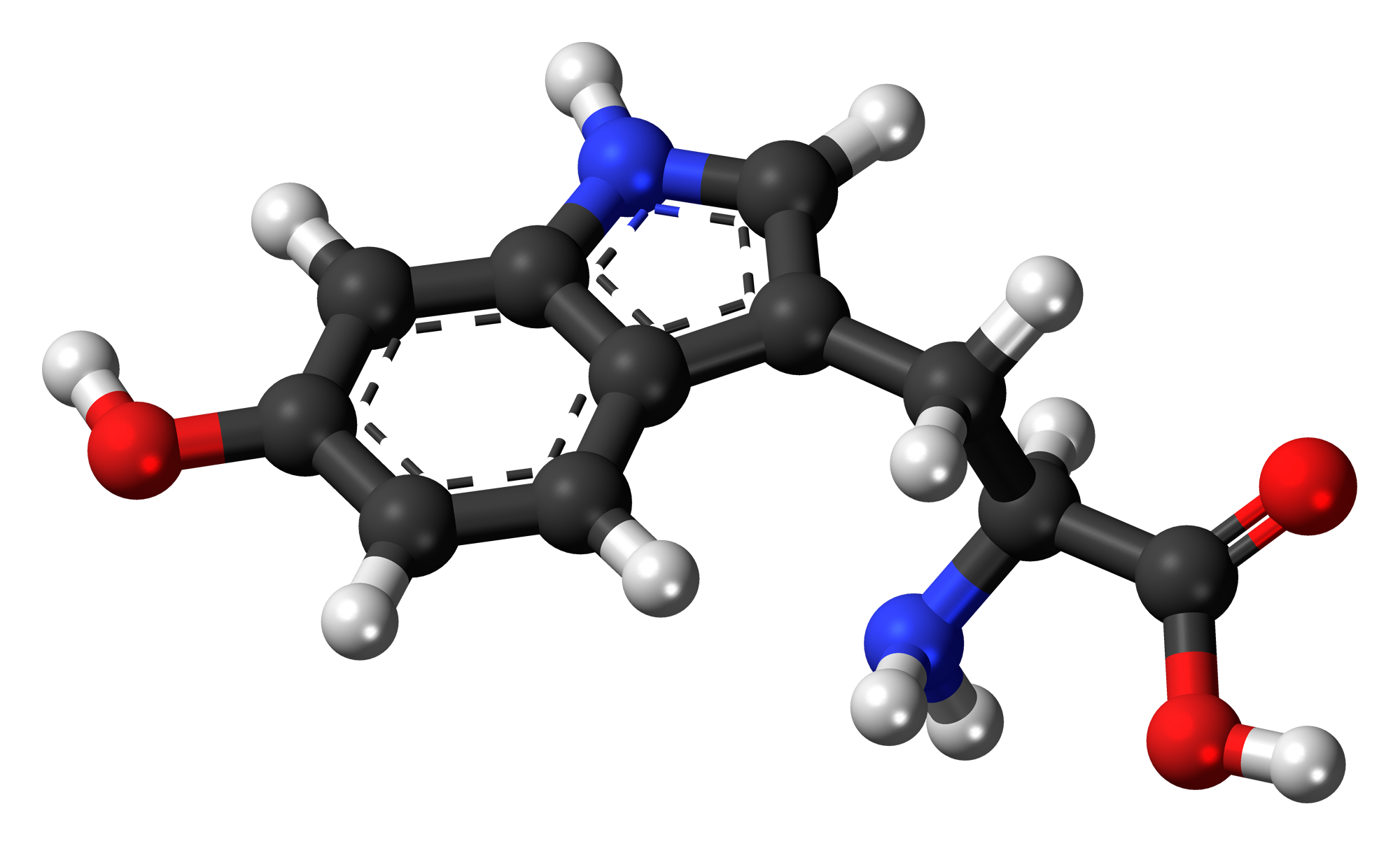

Names
- IUPAC name 2-amino-3-(5-hydroxy-1H-indol-3-yl)propanoic acid
- Other names 5-HTP; Oxitriptan; α-Carboxy-5-hydroxytryptamine; α-Carboxy-5-HT

Identifiers
CAS Number	56-69-9
3D model (JSmol)	Interactive image
ChEBI	CHEBI:17780
ChEMBL	ChEMBL350221
ChemSpider	388413
ECHA InfoCard	100.022.193
IUPHAR/BPS	4671
KEGG	D07339
MeSH	5-Hydroxytryptophan
PubChem CID	144
UNII	C1LJO185Q9
CompTox Dashboard (EPA)	DTXSID1025437
- InChI: InChI=1S/C11H12N2O3/c12-9(11(15)16)3-6-5-13-10-2-1-7(14)4-8(6)10/h1-2,4-5,9,13-14H,3,12H2,(H,15,16)/t9-/m0/s1 Key: LDCYZAJDBXYCGN-VIFPVBQESA-N; InChI=1/C11H12N2O3/c12-9(11(15)16)3-6-5-13-10-2-1-7(14)4-8(6)10/h1-2,4-5,9,13-14H,3,12H2,(H,15,16)/t9-/m0/s1 Key: LDCYZAJDBXYCGN-VIFPVBQEBZ
- SMILES: O=C(O)[C@@H](N)Cc2c1cc(O)ccc1[nH]c2

Properties
Chemical formula	C_{11}H_{12}N_{2}O_{3}
Molar mass	220.228 g·mol^{−1}
Density	1.484 g/mL
Melting point	298 to 300 °C (568 to 572 °F; 571 to 573 K)
Boiling point	520.6 °C (969.1 °F; 793.8 K)
- Except where otherwise noted, data are given for materials in their standard state (at 25 °C [77 °F], 100 kPa). verify (what is ?) Infobox references

5-Hydroxytryptophan (5-HTP), used medically as oxitriptan, is a naturally occurring amino acid and chemical precursor as well as a metabolic intermediate in the biosynthesis of the neurotransmitter serotonin.

5-HTP can be manufactured and used as a drug and supplement with the INN oxitriptan. Brand names include Cincofarm, Levothym, Levotonine, Oxyfan, Telesol, Tript-OH, and Triptum. As a drug, it is used in the treatment of depression and for certain other indications.

== Production ==
5-HTP is produced from the amino acid tryptophan through the action of the enzyme tryptophan hydroxylase. Tryptophan hydroxylase is one of the biopterin-dependent aromatic amino acid hydroxylases. Production of 5-HTP is the rate-limiting step in 5-HT (serotonin) synthesis. 5-HTP is normally rapidly converted to 5-HT by amino acid decarboxylase.

== Metabolism ==
5-HTP is decarboxylated to serotonin (5-hydroxytryptamine or 5-HT) by the enzyme aromatic-L-amino-acid decarboxylase with the help of vitamin B_{6}. This reaction occurs both in nervous tissue and in the liver. 5-HTP crosses the blood–brain barrier, while 5-HT does not. Excess 5-HTP, especially when administered with vitamin B_{6}, is thought to be metabolized and excreted.

Metabolic pathway from tryptophan to serotonin.

5-HTP	AAAD	Serotonin
	PLP

== Dietary sources ==
Though 5-HTP is found in food only in insignificant quantities, it is a chemical involved intermediately in the metabolism of tryptophan, an amino acid found in all unfractionated foods, with lower total amino acid content correlating with increased tryptophan absorption.

== Use as a medication and supplement ==
5-HTP has been used medically and as a supplement under the name oxitriptan in the treatment of depression and for certain other indications. As of 2025, there are no current FDA approved medications containing 5-HTP.

It can be potentiated in combination with a peripherally selective aromatic L-amino acid decarboxylase (AAAD) inhibitor such as carbidopa or benserazide. These agents increase the strength and duration of oxitriptan. An investigational combination formulation is oxitriptan/carbidopa.

== Research ==
=== Psychedelic effects ===
5-HTP robustly produces the head-twitch response (HTR) in rodents when administered at relatively high doses. It dose-dependently induces the HTR in mice across a dose range of 50 to 250 mg/kg via intraperitoneal administration, with an inverted U-shaped dose–response curve and maximal induction of the HTR at a dose of 200 mg/kg. Similarly to the case of 5-HTP, intracerebroventricular injection of serotonin, but not peripheral administration of serotonin, produces the HTR. The HTR is induced by serotonergic psychedelics like lysergic acid diethylamide (LSD) and psilocybin and is a behavioral proxy of psychedelic effects.

The HTR of 5-HTP is blocked by serotonin 5-HT_{2A} receptor antagonists, which block the hallucinogenic effects of serotonergic psychedelics in humans, is prevented by aromatic L-amino acid decarboxylase (AAAD) inhibitors, which block conversion of 5-HTP into serotonin, and is potentiated by monoamine oxidase A (MAO-A) inhibitors, which prevent the degradation of serotonin and other endogenous tryptamines. It is also suppressed by the serotonin 5-HT_{1A} receptor full agonist 8-OH-DPAT, is greatly augmented by the serotonin 5-HT_{2C} receptor antagonist RS-102221, and is reduced by the trace amine-associated receptor 1 (TAAR1) antagonist EPPTB. In addition, the HTR of 5-HTP is abolished by indolethylamine N-methyltransferase (INMT) inhibitors, which block conversion of serotonin and other endogenous tryptamines into N-methylated tryptamines, such as N-methylserotonin (NMS; norbufotenin), bufotenin (5-hydroxy-N,N-dimethyltryptamine; 5-HO-DMT), and N,N-dimethyltryptamine (DMT). These N-methylated tryptamines are well-known for their psychedelic effects, whereas serotonin itself, without biotransformation, does not seem to produce psychedelic effects. 5-HTP has not been found to produce psychedelic effects in humans, which has been attributed to the high doses required to produce such effects. The 5-HTP doses that produce the HTR in rodents are orders of magnitude higher than the doses of 5-HTP that have been used safely and therapeutically in humans. It remains unknown whether 5-HTP can produce psychedelic effects in humans. The highest dosage of 5-HTP that is known to have been evaluated in humans is about 3,000 mg per day. Serotonin syndrome and associated hallucinations have been reported with overdose of serotonin-elevating drugs, but psychedelic-like effects have not been reported.

The lack of the HTR and psychedelic effects with serotonin itself has been attributed to the fact that these effects appear to be dependent on activation of a population of intracellular 5-HT_{2A} receptors expressed in cortical neurons in the medial prefrontal cortex (mPFC) that lack the serotonin transporter (SERT) and are inaccessible to serotonin. Serotonin itself is too hydrophilic to enter serotonergic neurons without the SERT, whereas serotonergic psychedelics and serotonin's N-methylated metabolites and analogues are lipophilic and readily enter these neurons. These findings may also explain why selective serotonin reuptake inhibitors (SSRIs) and related serotonergic agents do not produce psychedelic effects.

The properties of 5-HTP in animal drug discrimination tests have been studied. 5-HTP generalizes with the serotonin releasing agent fenfluramine and its cue is markedly potentiated by the selective serotonin reuptake inhibitor (SSRI) fluoxetine. However, numerous serotonin receptor antagonists, including methysergide, cyproheptadine, metergoline, methiothepin (metitepine), ketanserin, pirenperone, pizotifen, and mianserin, all failed to block the discriminative stimulus properties of 5-HTP. Conflictingly however, in a subsequent study, pizotifen was able to fully block the discriminative stimulus properties of 5-HTP. The inability of serotonin 5-HT_{2A} receptor antagonists to block the discriminative stimulus properties of 5-HTP is in notable contrast to their ability to block the 5-HTP-induced HTR. 5-HTP only partially substitutes for LSD in drug discrimination tests, whereas LSD and quipazine fully substitute for 5-HTP. The full substitution of LSD and quipazine for 5-HTP can be blocked by the serotonin 5-HT_{2A} receptor antagonist ketanserin. The findings of drug discrimination tests suggest that 5-HTP has a more complex or compound discriminative stimulus compared to other agents like LSD and that its stimulus properties may not be readily explained by either the serotonin 5-HT_{1} or 5-HT_{2} receptors alone. Instead, a combination of actions at these and/or other receptors may be involved in its stimulus effects.

== See also ==
- α-Methyl-5-hydroxytryptophan
