= L-DOPA =

Chemical compound

- Skeletal formula of L-DOPA

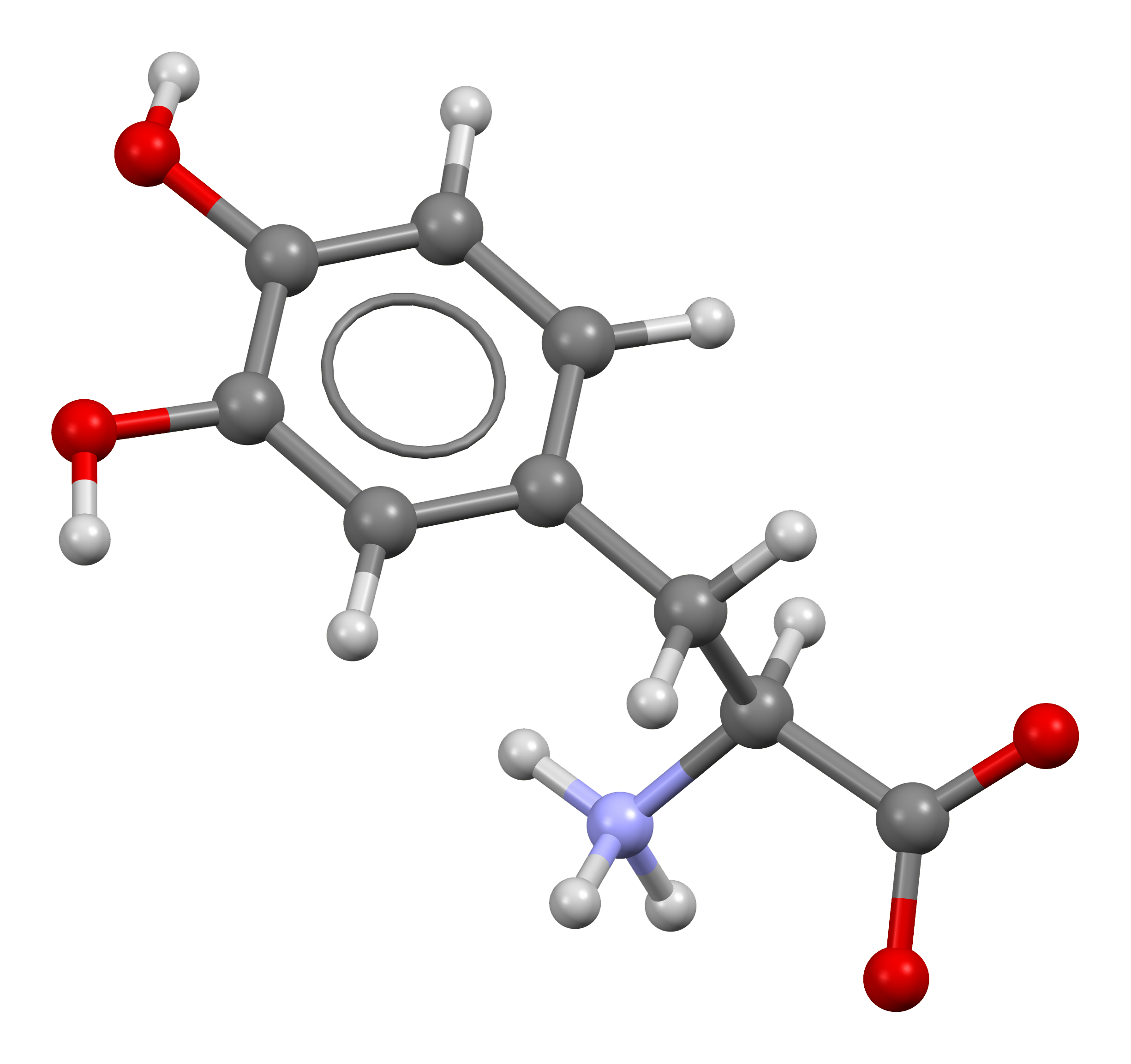
- Ball-and-stick model of the zwitterionic form of L-DOPA found in the crystal structure

Names
- IUPAC name (S)-2-Amino-3-(3,4-dihydroxyphenyl)propanoic acid
- Other names l-3,4-Dihydroxyphenylalanine; Levodopa

Identifiers
CAS Number	59-92-7
3D model (JSmol)	Interactive image
ChEBI	CHEBI:15765
ChEMBL	ChEMBL1009
ChemSpider	5824
DrugBank	DB01235
ECHA InfoCard	100.000.405
EC Number	200-445-2
KEGG	C00355
PubChem CID	6047
UNII	46627O600J
CompTox Dashboard (EPA)	DTXSID9023209
- InChI: InChI=1S/C9H11NO4/c10-6(9(13)14)3-5-1-2-7(11)8(12)4-5/h1-2,4,6,11-12H,3,10H2,(H,13,14)/t6-/m0/s1 Key: WTDRDQBEARUVNC-LURJTMIESA-N
- SMILES: C1=CC(=C(C=C1C[C@@H](C(=O)O)N)O)O

Properties
Chemical formula	C_{9}H_{11}NO_{4}
Molar mass	197.19 g/mol
- Except where otherwise noted, data are given for materials in their standard state (at 25 °C [77 °F], 100 kPa). Infobox references

l-DOPA, also known as l-3,4-dihydroxyphenylalanine and used medically as levodopa, is made and used as part of the normal biology of some plants and animals, including humans. Humans, as well as a portion of the other animals that utilize l-DOPA, make it via biosynthesis from the amino acid l-tyrosine.

l-DOPA is the precursor to the neurotransmitters dopamine, norepinephrine (noradrenaline), and epinephrine (adrenaline), which are collectively known as catecholamines. Furthermore, l-DOPA itself mediates neurotrophic factor release by the brain and central nervous system. In some plant families (of the order Caryophyllales), l-DOPA is the central precursor of a biosynthetic pathway that produces a class of pigments called betalains.

l-DOPA can be manufactured and in its pure form is sold as a drug with the INN levodopa. As a drug, it is used in the treatment of Parkinson's disease and dopamine-responsive dystonia, as well as restless leg syndrome.

l-DOPA has a counterpart with opposite chirality, d-DOPA. As is true for many molecules, the human body produces only one of these isomers (the l-DOPA form). The enantiomeric purity of l-DOPA may be analyzed by determination of the optical rotation or by chiral thin-layer chromatography.

== Biological role ==
Biosynthetic pathways for catecholamines and trace amines in the human brain
In humans, catecholamines and phenethylaminergic trace amines are derived from the amino acid L-phenylalanine.

l-DOPA is produced from the amino acid l-tyrosine by the enzyme tyrosine hydroxylase. l-DOPA can act as an l-tyrosine mimetic and be incorporated into proteins by mammalian cells in place of l-tyrosine, generating protease-resistant and aggregate-prone proteins in vitro and may contribute to neurotoxicity with chronic l-DOPA administration. It is also the precursor for the monoamine or catecholamine neurotransmitters dopamine, norepinephrine (noradrenaline), and epinephrine (adrenaline). Dopamine is formed by the decarboxylation of l-DOPA by aromatic l-amino acid decarboxylase (AADC).

l-DOPA can be directly metabolized by catechol-O-methyl transferase to 3-O-methyldopa, and then further to vanillactic acid. This metabolic pathway is nonexistent in the healthy body, but becomes important after peripheral l-DOPA administration in patients with Parkinson's disease or in the rare cases of patients with AADC enzyme deficiency.

l-Phenylalanine, l-tyrosine, and l-DOPA are all precursors to the biological pigment melanin. The enzyme tyrosinase catalyzes the oxidation of l-DOPA to the reactive intermediate dopaquinone, which reacts further, eventually leading to melanin oligomers. In addition, tyrosinase can convert tyrosine directly to l-DOPA in the presence of a reducing agent such as ascorbic acid.

== Chemistry ==
L-DOPA, also known as L-3,4-dihydroxyphenylalanine or L-3-hydroxytyrosine, is an aromatic amino acid derived from L-phenylalanine and L-tyrosine. It is a phenethylamine, monoamine, and catecholamine, and is a biological precursor of the neurotransmitters dopamine (3,4-dihydroxyphenethylamine), norepinephrine (3,4,β-trihydroxyphenethylamine), and epinephrine (3,4,β-trihydroxy-N-methylphenethylamine).

=== Synthesis ===
Synthesis of l-DOPA via hydrogenation with C_{2}-symmetric diphosphine.

== History ==
l-DOPA was first isolated from the seeds of the Vicia faba (broad bean) plant in 1913 by Swiss biochemist Markus Guggenheim.

The 2001 Nobel Prize in Chemistry was also related to l-DOPA: the Nobel Committee awarded one-quarter of the prize to William S. Knowles for his work on chirally catalysed hydrogenation reactions, the most noted example of which was used for the synthesis of l-DOPA.

== Other organisms ==
=== Marine adhesion ===
l-DOPA is a key compound in the formation of marine adhesive proteins, such as those found in mussels. It is believed to be responsible for the water-resistance and rapid curing abilities of these proteins. l-DOPA may also be used to prevent surfaces from fouling by bonding antifouling polymers to a susceptible substrate. The versatile chemistry of l-DOPA can be exploited in nanotechnology. For example, DOPA-containing self-assembling peptides were found to form functional nanostructures, adhesives and gels.

=== In plants and in the environment ===
In plants, L-DOPA functions as an allelochemical which inhibits the growth of certain species, and is produced and secreted by a few legume species such as the broad bean Vicia faba and the velvet bean Mucuna pruriens. Its effect is strongly dependent on the pH and the reactivity of iron in the soil. A 2025 study reported that exogenous L-DOPA triggers a rapid iron-deficiency response in plants, independent of their iron nutritional status. L-DOPA was also suggested to protect Arabidopsis plants against cadmium toxicity.

L-DOPA can also be found in cephalopod ink.

== Use as a medication and supplement ==
L-DOPA is used medically under the name levodopa in the treatment of Parkinson's disease and certain other medical conditions. It is usually used in combination with a peripherally selective aromatic L-amino acid decarboxylase (AAAD) inhibitor such as carbidopa or benserazide. These agents increase the strength and duration of levodopa. Combination formulations include levodopa/carbidopa and levodopa/benserazide, as well as levodopa/carbidopa/entacapone.

L-DOPA is found in high amounts in Mucuna pruriens (velvet bean) and is available and used over-the-counter as a supplement.
