= Levodopa/benserazide =

Medication

Combination of
- Levodopa: Dopamine agonist
- Benserazide: Decarboxylase inhibitors

Clinical data
- Trade names: Prolopa, Madopar, others
- Pregnancy category: AU: B3
- Routes of administration: By mouth
- ATC code: N04BA02 (WHO)

Legal status
- Legal status: AU: S4 (Prescription only); CA: ℞-only; UK: POM (Prescription only); In general: ℞ (Prescription only)

Identifiers
- KEGG: D02135

Levodopa/benserazide, sold under the brand name Prolopa among others, is a fixed-dose combination medication used for the treatment of Parkinson's disease.

== Medical uses ==
Levodopa/benserazide is indicated for the treatment of Parkinson's disease with the exception of drug-induced parkinsonism.
