= Deficiency (medicine) =

Lack or shortage causing dysfunction

In medicine, a deficiency is a lack or shortage of a functional entity, by less than normal or necessary supply or function. A person can have chromosomal deficiencies, mental deficiencies, nutritional deficiencies, complement deficiencies, or enzyme deficiencies.

== Nutritional deficiency ==
Protein-energy malnutrition (PEM) is a condition where people consume very little in the way of energy, proteins, or both in their diets; as a result, it is common in developing nations. The two main illnesses associated with this condition are kwashiorkor, which is characterized by severe protein deficiency, and marasmus, which is total food deprivation with abnormally low amounts of protein and energy.

=== Carbohydrates deficiency ===
Certain human body cells, such as neurons, require high glucose concentrations. When there are insufficient carbohydrates in the diet, the breakdown of body proteins, dietary proteins, and glycerol from fats is what drives gluconeogenesis. Most gluconeogenesis occurs in the liver. A condition known as ketosis (increased ketones production), which is characterized by a strangely sweet-smelling patient, may result from a prolonged shortage of carbohydrates.

=== Essential fatty acids deficiency ===
The essential fatty acids (EFA) omega-3 and omega-6 are polyunsaturated. Clinical signs of an EFA deficiency include stunted growth in kids and babies, a scaly, dry rash, slowed wound healing and heightened susceptibility to infections.

== Enzyme deficiency ==
Enzymes are unique protein subtypes that are needed during metabolism, the process by which the body obtains energy for regular growth and development, to break down food molecules into fuel. A variety of conditions that can change or even endanger life are caused by inherited defects known as enzyme deficiencies, or the lack of these enzymes. Enzyme deficiencies include Niemann-Pick disease, Lysosomal storage diseases, and Mucopolysaccharidoses.

== See also ==
- Complement deficiency
- Micronutrient deficiency
- Mineral deficiency
- Vitamin deficiency
