= George Cotzias =

American scientist

George Constantin Cotzias (June 16, 1918 – June 13, 1977) was a Greek scientist who together with his coworkers developed L-Dopa treatment, currently the most commonly used treatment for Parkinson's disease.

== Early life ==
Cotzias was born in Chania on the island of Crete, Greece, on 16 June 1918. He was son of the two-times (1934 and 1951) mayor of Athens, Costas Cotzias. He started his medical studies at the National and Kapodistrian University of Athens, but fled to USA with his father when German troops invaded Athens (1941). He was accepted at Harvard Medical School and two years later he graduated cum laude. He then trained as an intern in pathology at Brigham Hospital, as an intern in medicine at Massachusetts General Hospital, and was a resident in neurology at Massachusetts General Hospital.

== Career ==
Cotzias then worked in the Rockefeller Institute for Medical Research and in the Brookhaven National Laboratory. In 1957, Swedish scientist Arvid Carlsson demonstrated that dopamine was a neurotransmitter in the brain and not just a precursor for norepinephrine, as had been previously believed. He developed a method for measuring the amount of dopamine in brain tissues and found that dopamine levels in the basal ganglia, a brain area important for movement, were particularly high. He then showed that giving animals the drug reserpine caused a decrease in dopamine levels and a loss of movement control. These effects were similar to the symptoms of Parkinson's disease. Arvid Carlsson subsequently won the Nobel Prize in Physiology or Medicine in 2000 along with co-recipients Eric Kandel and Paul Greengard.

Subsequently, other physicians treated human Parkinson's patients with L-Dopa (the metabolic precursor for dopamine) and found it to alleviate some of the symptoms in the early stages of Parkinson's. Unlike dopamine, L-Dopa passes the blood brain barrier. This produced transient benefit after injection of L-dopa. However, because of the severe toxicity associated with the injection, L-Dopa was not of practical value as a treatment.

At this point, Cotzias made the critical observation that converted the transient response into a successful, large scale treatment. By starting with very small doses of DOPA, given orally every two hours under continued observation, and gradually increasing the dose he was able to stabilize patients on large enough doses to cause a dramatic remission of their symptoms. The first study reporting improvements in patients with Parkinson's disease resulting from treatment with L-dopa was published in 1968. The result was soon confirmed by other investigators and has now become the standard treatment for Parkinsonian symptoms.

== Awards and honors ==
Cotzias is the winner of the 1969 Albert Lasker Award for Clinical Medical Research. He received honorary degrees from Catholic University, Santiago (1969); Women's Medical College of Pennsylvania (1970); St. John's University, New York (1971); and the National and Kapodistrian University, Athens (1974). Lewis Thomas called him "one of the great figures in American medical science."

Cotzias appears as a minor character in the American poet James Merrill's The Changing Light at Sandover.
