= Foslevodopa =

Chemical compound

Identifiers
- IUPAC name: (2S)-2-Amino-3-(3-hydroxy-4-phosphonooxyphenyl)propanoic acid
- CAS Number: 97321-87-4
- PubChem CID: 127766
- DrugBank: DB16683
- ChemSpider: 113330
- UNII: 37NQZ0J76I
- KEGG: D11839
- ChEBI: CHEBI:192509
- ChEMBL: ChEMBL4594379
- CompTox Dashboard (EPA): DTXSID70905957

Chemical and physical data
- Formula: C_{9}H_{12}NO_{7}P
- Molar mass: 277.169 g·mol^{−1}
- 3D model (JSmol): Interactive image
- SMILES: C1=CC(=C(C=C1C[C@@H](C(=O)O)N)O)OP(=O)(O)O
- InChI: InChI=1S/C9H12NO7P/c10-6(9(12)13)3-5-1-2-8(7(11)4-5)17-18(14,15)16/h1-2,4,6,11H,3,10H2,(H,12,13)(H2,14,15,16)/t6-/m0/s1; Key:YNDMEEULGSTYJT-LURJTMIESA-N

Foslevodopa is a medication which acts as a prodrug for levodopa, originally invented in the 1980s but not developed for medical use at that time. It is approved for use in a subcutaneous infusion as a fixed-dose combination with foscarbidopa for the treatment of Parkinson's disease, under the brand name Vyalev.
