= Benserazide =

Chemical compound often used as medication

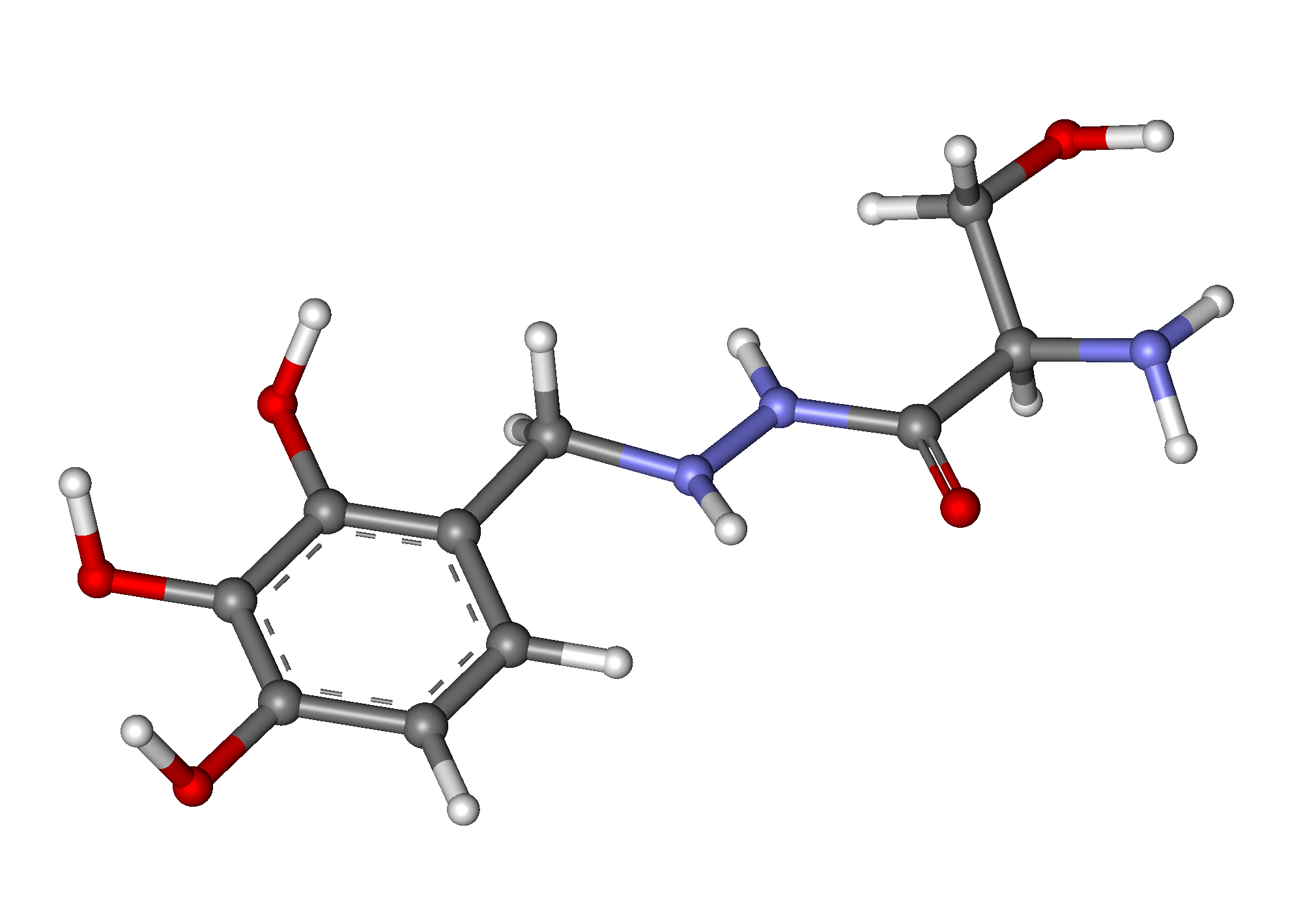

Clinical data
- Other names: Serazide, RO 4-4602
- AHFS/Drugs.com: International Drug Names
- Pregnancy category: AU: B3
- ATC code: None

Identifiers
- IUPAC name: (RS)-2-Amino-3-hydroxy-N′-(2,3,4-trihydroxybenzyl)propanehydrazide
- CAS Number: 322-35-0; as HCl: 14919-77-8
- PubChem CID: 2327
- IUPHAR/BPS: 5150
- DrugBank: DB12783; as HCl: DBSALT002687
- ChemSpider: 2237; as HCl: 25109
- UNII: 762OS3ZEJU; as HCl: B66E5RK36Q
- KEGG: D03082
- ChEBI: CHEBI:64187; as HCl: CHEBI:31262
- ChEMBL: ChEMBL1096979; as HCl: ChEMBL1255778
- CompTox Dashboard (EPA): DTXSID9022651

Chemical and physical data
- Formula: C_{10}H_{15}N_{3}O_{5}
- Molar mass: 257.246 g·mol^{−1}
- 3D model (JSmol): Interactive image
- SMILES: NC(CO)C(=O)NNCC1=C(O)C(O)=C(O)C=C1
- InChI: InChI=1S/C10H15N3O5/c11-6(4-14)10(18)13-12-3-5-1-2-7(15)9(17)8(5)16/h1-2,6,12,14-17H,3-4,11H2,(H,13,18); Key:BNQDCRGUHNALGH-UHFFFAOYSA-N; as HCl: InChI=1S/C10H15N3O5.ClH/c11-6(4-14)10(18)13-12-3-5-1-2-7(15)9(17)8(5)16;/h1-2,6,12,14-17H,3-4,11H2,(H,13,18);1H; Key:ULFCBIUXQQYDEI-UHFFFAOYSA-N

Benserazide is a peripherally acting aromatic L-amino acid decarboxylase or DOPA decarboxylase inhibitor, which is unable to cross the blood–brain barrier.

Benserazide is a therapeutic alternative on the World Health Organization's List of Essential Medicines.

== Medical uses ==
Benserazide is used in the management of Parkinson's disease in combination with levodopa as co-beneldopa (BAN), under the brand names Madopar in the UK and Prolopa in Canada, both made by Roche. Benserazide is not approved for use in the US; carbidopa is used, instead, for the same purpose. These combinations are also used for the treatment of restless legs syndrome.

== Pharmacology ==
Levodopa is a precursor to the neurotransmitter dopamine, which is administered to increase its levels in the central nervous system. However, most levodopa is decarboxylated to dopamine before it reaches the brain, and since dopamine is unable to cross the blood–brain barrier, this translates to little therapeutic gain with strong peripheral side effects.

Benserazide inhibits the aforementioned decarboxylation, and since it cannot cross the blood–brain barrier itself, this allows dopamine to build up solely in the brain, instead. Adverse effects caused by peripheral dopamine, such as vasoconstriction, nausea, and arrhythmia, are minimized. However, benserazide cannot reduce the centrally mediated side effects of levodopa, particularly dyskinesia.

Benserazide has little therapeutic effect on its own, and its effect occurs synergically in combination with levodopa.

The enzyme inhibited by benzerazide catalyzes many different decarboxylations. The same effect of concentrating the conversion of levodopa into dopamine to the central nervous system can be achieved with the following decarboxylations being confined to the central nervous system:

- 5-HTP to serotonin
- Tryptophan to tryptamine
- Phenylalanine to phenethylamine
- L-Tyrosine to tyramine

Centrally mediated side effects of higher levels of neuro- and trace amine-transmitters may worsen in combination with monoamine oxidase inhibitors. Other side effects in combination with L-DOPA include nausea, vomiting etc.
