= Aromatic L-amino acid decarboxylase =

Class of enzymes

Aromatic L-amino acid decarboxylase (DOPA decarboxylase)
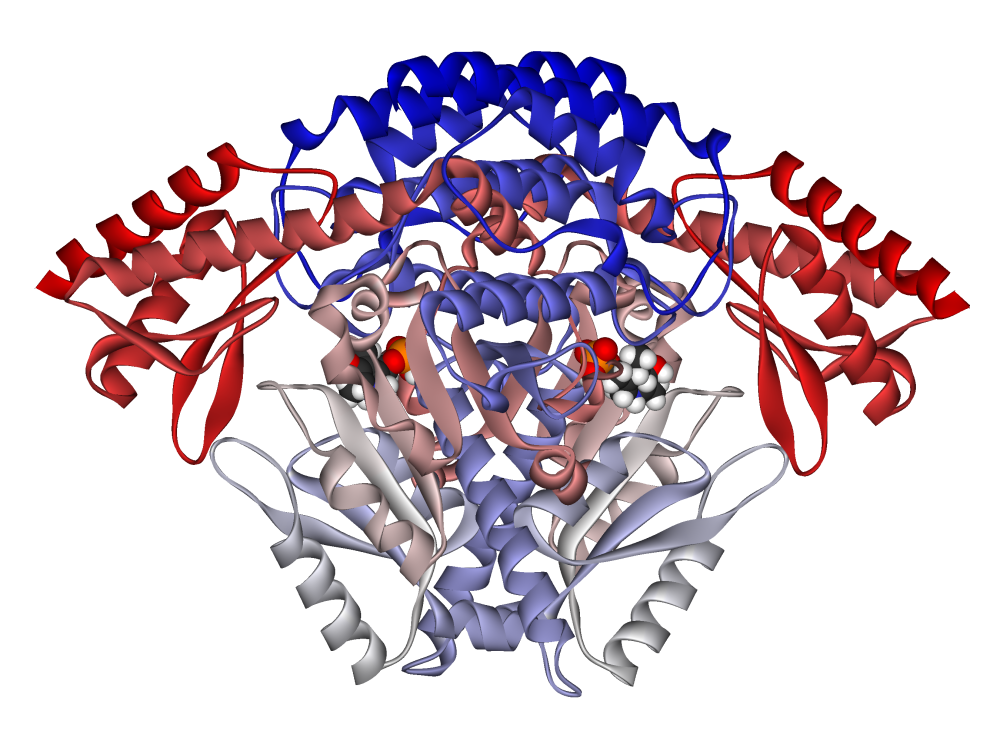
- Ribbon diagram of a DOPA decarboxylase dimer.

Identifiers
- EC no.: 4.1.1.28
- CAS no.: 9042-64-2

Databases
- BRENDA: enzyme data
- ExPASy: NiceZyme view
- KEGG: enzyme entry
- MetaCyc: metabolic pathway
- Rhea: reactions
- PDB structures: RCSB PDB PDBe PDBsum
- Gene Ontology: AmiGO / QuickGO
Search
- PMC: articles
- PubMed: articles
- NCBI: proteins

DOPA decarboxylase (aromatic L-amino acid decarboxylase)
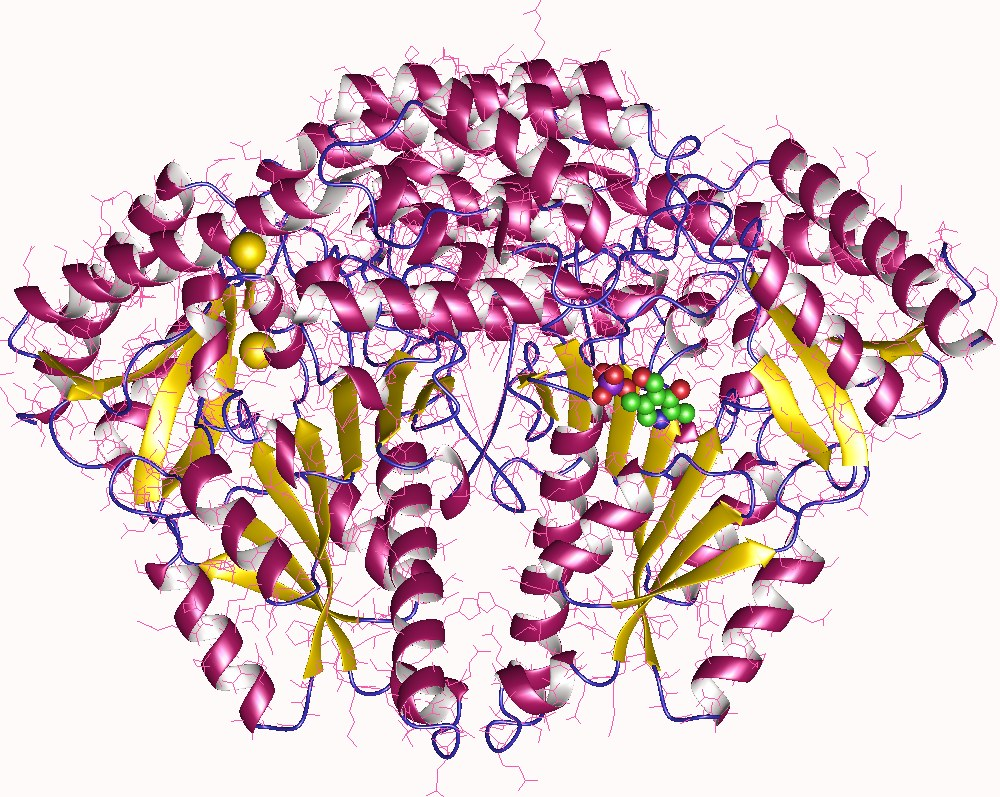
- Aromatic L-amino acid decarboxylase homodimer, Human

Identifiers
- Symbol: DDC
- NCBI gene: 1644
- HGNC: 2719
- OMIM: 107930
- RefSeq: NM_000790
- UniProt: P20711

Other data
- EC number: 4.1.1.28
- Locus: Chr. 7 p11
Search for
- Structures: Swiss-model
- Domains: InterPro

Aromatic L-amino acid decarboxylase (AADC or AAAD), also known as DOPA decarboxylase (DDC), tryptophan decarboxylase, and 5-hydroxytryptophan decarboxylase, is a lyase enzyme (EC 4.1.1.28) that produces dopamine and certain related neurotransmitters. In humans, it is encoded by the gene DDC.

== Mechanism ==
The enzyme uses pyridoxal phosphate (PLP), the active form of vitamin B_{6}, as a cofactor. PLP is essential to the mechanism of decarboxylation in AADC. In the active enzyme, PLP is bound to lysine-303 of AADC as a Schiff base. Upon substrate binding, Lys-303 is displaced by the substrate's amine. This positions the carboxylate of the substrate within the active site such that decarboxylation is favored. Decarboxylation of the substrate produces a quinonoid intermediate, which is subsequently protonated to produce a Schiff base adduct of PLP and the decarboxylated product. Lys-303 can then regenerate the original Schiff base, releasing the product while retaining PLP.

Probing this PLP-catalyzed decarboxylation, it has been discovered that there is a difference in concentration and pH dependence between substrates. DOPA is optimally decarboxylated at pH 6.7 and a PLP concentration of 0.125 mM, while the conditions for optimal 5-HTP decarboxylation were found to be pH 8.3 and 0.3 mM PLP.

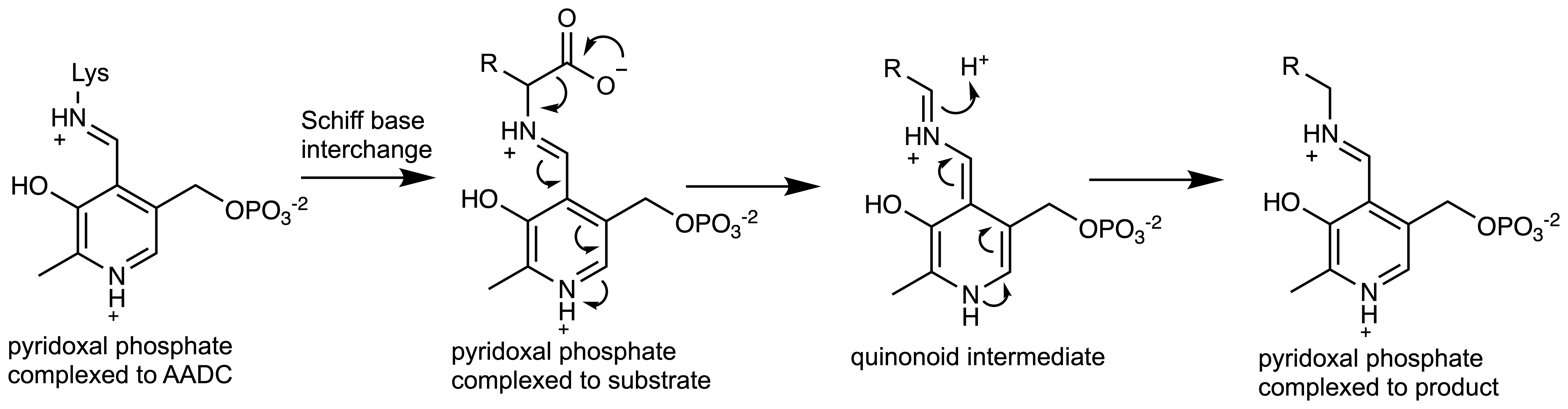
Mechanism of aromatic L-amino acid decarboxylase

== Structure ==
Aromatic L-amino acid decarboxylase is active as a homodimer. Before addition of the pyridoxal phosphate cofactor, the apoenzyme exists in an open conformation. Upon cofactor binding, a large structural transformation occurs as the subunits pull closer and close the active site. This conformational change results in the active, closed holoenzyeme.

In PLP-deficient murine models, it has been observed that dopamine levels do not significantly deviate from PLP-supplemented specimens; however, the concentration of serotonin in the deficient brain model was significant. This variable effect of PLP-deficiency indicates possible isoforms of AADC with differential substrate specificity for DOPA and 5-HTP. Dialysis studies also suggest that the potential isoform responsible for DOPA decarboxylation has a greater binding affinity for PLP than that of 5-HTP decarboxylase.

== Regulation ==
AADC regulation, especially as it relates to L-DOPA decarboxylation, has been studied extensively. AADC has several conserved protein kinase A (PKA) and protein kinase G recognition sites, with residues S220, S336, S359, T320, and S429 all as potential phosphate acceptors. In vitro studies have confirmed PKA and PKG can both phosphorylate AADC, causing a significant increase in activity. In addition, dopamine receptor antagonists have been shown to increase AADC activity in rodent models, while activation of some dopamine receptors suppresses AADC activity. Such receptor-mediated regulation is biphasic, with an initial short term activation followed by long term activation. The short term activation is thought to proceed through kinase activation and subsequent phosphorylation of AADC, while the sensitivity of long term activation to protein translation inhibitors suggests regulation of mRNA transcription.

== Reactions ==
AADC catalyzes several different decarboxylation reactions:

- L-DOPA to dopamine – a neurotransmitter
- L-Phenylalanine to phenethylamine – a trace amine which functions as a neuromodulator
- L-Tyrosine to tyramine – a trace amine neuromodulator
- L-Histidine to histamine – a neurotransmitter
- L-Tryptophan to tryptamine – a trace amine neuromodulator
- 5-HTP to serotonin (5-hydroxytryptamine) – a neurotransmitter

However, some of these reactions do not seem to bear much or any biological significance. For example, histamine is biosynthesised strictly via the enzyme histidine decarboxylase in humans and other organisms.

Biosynthetic pathways for catecholamines and trace amines in the human brain
In humans, catecholamines and phenethylaminergic trace amines are derived from the amino acid L-phenylalanine.

Human serotonin biosynthesis pathway

== Clinical relevance ==
In normal dopamine and serotonin (5-HT) neurotransmitter synthesis, AADC is not the rate-limiting step in either reaction. However, AADC becomes the rate-limiting step of dopamine synthesis in patients treated with L-DOPA (such as in Parkinson's disease), and the rate-limiting step of serotonin synthesis in people treated with 5-HTP (such as in mild depression or dysthymia). AADC is inhibited by carbidopa outside of the blood brain barrier to inhibit the premature conversion of L-DOPA to dopamine in the treatment of Parkinson's.

In humans, AADC is also the rate-limiting enzyme in the formation of trace amines. Aromatic L-amino acid decarboxylase deficiency is associated with various symptoms as severe developmental delay, oculogyric crises and autonomic dysfunction. The molecular and clinical spectrum of AAAC deficiency is heterogeneous. The first case of AADC deficiency was described in twin brothers 1990. Patients can be treated with dopamine agonists, MAO inhibitors, and pyridoxine (vitamin B_{6}). Clinical phenotype and response to treatment is variable and the long-term and functional outcome is unknown. To provide a basis for improving the understanding of the epidemiology, genotype–phenotype correlation and outcome of these diseases their impact on the quality of life of patients, and for evaluating diagnostic and therapeutic strategies a patient registry was established by the noncommercial International Working Group on Neurotransmitter Related Disorders (iNTD).

Immunohistochemical studies have revealed that AADC is expressed in various neuronal cell types such as serotonergic and catecholaminergic neurons. Neurons that express AADC but are not considered classical monoaminergic cell neurons are termed D cells. Cells that are immunoreactive for AADC have also been found in the human brainstem. These cells include melanin-pigmented cells that are typically designated as catecholaminergic and may also be serotonergic. Significant localization of dopaminergic cells that are also immunoreactive for AADC is reported in the substantia nigra, ventral tegmental area, and the mesencephalic reticular formation. Unlike previous reports on animal models, nonaminergic (D cells) are unlikely to be observed in the human brain.

== Genetics ==
The gene encoding the enzyme is referred to as DDC is located on chromosome 7 in humans. It consists of 15 exons encoding a protein of 480 amino acids. Single nucleotide polymorphisms and other gene variations have been investigated in relation to neuropsychiatric disorders, for example, a one-base pair deletion at 601 and a four-base pair deletion at 722–725 in exon 1 in relation to bipolar disorder and autism. No direct correlation between gene variation and autism was found.

More than 50 mutations of DDC have been correlated with AADC deficiency. This condition is most prevalent in Asia, presumably due to the founder effect.

Alternative splicing events and promoters have been observed that lead to various forms of the AADC enzyme. Unique usage of certain promoters leads to transcription of only the first exon to produce an extra-neuronal isoform, and splicing of exon 3 leads to a product devoid of enzymatic activity. Analyses via porcine specimens have elucidated two AADC isoforms – resulting from exclusion of exon 5 and exons 5 and 6 – that lack a portion of the decarboxylating domain.

== See also ==
- Aromatic L-amino acid decarboxylase inhibitor, a class of anti-Parkinson drugs
- Aromatic amino acids
- Histidine decarboxylase
