= Carbidopa =

Chemical compound

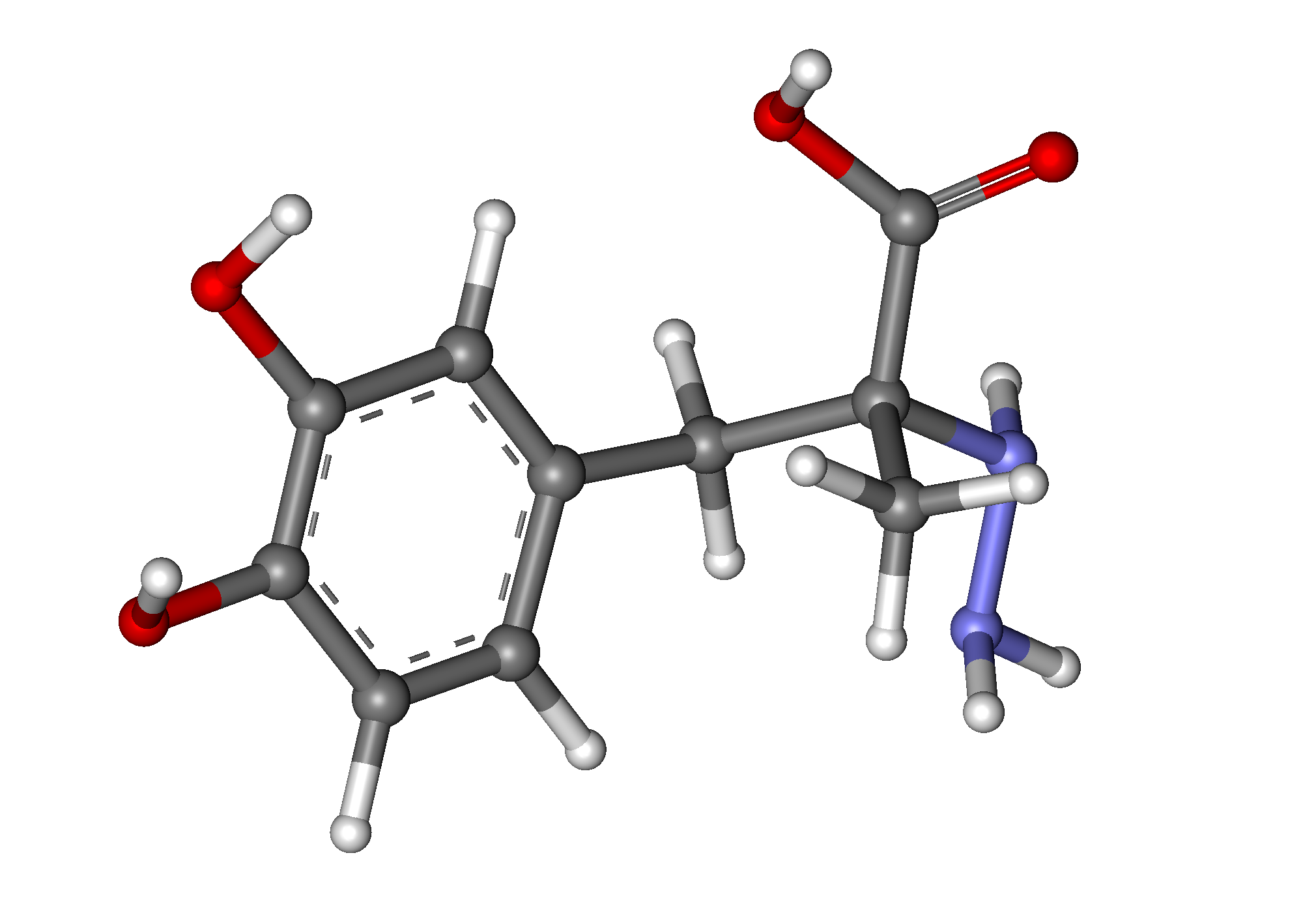

Clinical data
- Trade names: Lodosyn
- AHFS/Drugs.com: Monograph
- License data: EU EMA: by INN; US FDA: Carbidopa

Legal status
- Legal status: UK: POM (Prescription only); US: ℞-only

Pharmacokinetic data
- Protein binding: 76%
- Metabolism: 7 metabolites known, not metabolized extensively
- Elimination half-life: 2 hours

Identifiers
- IUPAC name: (2S)-3-(3,4-dihydroxyphenyl)-2-hydrazino-2-methylpropanoic acid
- CAS Number: 28860-95-9
- PubChem CID: 34359
- IUPHAR/BPS: 5159
- DrugBank: DB00190
- ChemSpider: 31640
- UNII: KR87B45RGH
- KEGG: D00558
- ChEBI: CHEBI:39585
- ChEMBL: ChEMBL1201236
- CompTox Dashboard (EPA): DTXSID4022735
- ECHA InfoCard: 100.044.778

Chemical and physical data
- Formula: C_{10}H_{14}N_{2}O_{4}
- Molar mass: 226.232 g·mol^{−1}
- 3D model (JSmol): Interactive image
- Melting point: 203 to 205 °C (397 to 401 °F)
- SMILES: O=C(O)[C@@](NN)(Cc1cc(O)c(O)cc1)C
- InChI: InChI=1S/C10H14N2O4/c1-10(12-11,9(15)16)5-6-2-3-7(13)8(14)4-6/h2-4,12-14H,5,11H2,1H3,(H,15,16)/t10-/m0/s1; Key:TZFNLOMSOLWIDK-JTQLQIEISA-N

Carbidopa, sold under the brand name Lodosyn, is a medication used primarily in the treatment of Parkinson's disease. A DOPA decarboxylase inhibitor, Carbidopa blocks the enzyme aromatic L-amino acid decarboxylase (AADC) in the peripheral nervous system, preventing the premature conversion of levodopa to dopamine outside the brain. Because carbidopa cannot cross the blood–brain barrier, it has no effect on DDC activity within the central nervous system, allowing a greater proportion of co-administered levodopa to reach the brain intact.

== Medical uses ==
=== Parkinson's disease ===
Parkinson's disease is characterized by the progressive loss of dopaminergic neurons in the substantia nigra. The primary pharmacologic strategy is to supplement declining dopamine levels by administering its precursor, levodopa, which (unlike dopamine itself) can cross the blood–brain barrier. However, without a peripheral DDC inhibitor, much of an oral levodopa dose is converted to dopamine in the body before it ever reaches the brain, both reducing therapeutic efficacy and causing peripheral side effects such as nausea and cardiovascular disturbances.

Co-administration of carbidopa addresses this problem. By inhibiting peripheral DDC, carbidopa reduces the required levodopa dose by approximately 75% and extends levodopa's plasma half-life from roughly 50 minutes to about 1.5 hours. The combination is commercially available under several brand names, including Sinemet, Kinson, Pharmacopa, and Atamet. A triple combination with entacapone (a COMT inhibitor that further enhances levodopa bioavailability) is marketed as Stalevo.

=== Serotonergic enhancement ===
Carbidopa is also used in combination with 5-hydroxytryptophan (5-HTP), a naturally occurring amino acid and precursor to serotonin. Because DDC also catalyzes the conversion of 5-HTP to serotonin, carbidopa can prevent this conversion peripherally and increase the amount of 5-HTP available to reach the central nervous system. In some European clinical settings, 5-HTP is prescribed with carbidopa for this purpose. However, several cases of scleroderma-like illness have been reported in patients using the combination.

== Pharmacology ==
Carbidopa is a peripheral inhibitor of aromatic L-amino acid decarboxylase (also called DOPA decarboxylase or DDC), the enzyme responsible for converting levodopa to dopamine and 5-hydroxytryptophan to serotonin. DDC is present both in peripheral tissues and in the central nervous system. However, carbidopa itself does not significantly cross the blood-brain barrier and therefore acts mainly outside the brain.

This property is important in the treatment of Parkinson's disease. Levodopa can cross the blood-brain barrier, whereas dopamine cannot. When levodopa is given alone, a substantial portion is converted to dopamine in peripheral tissues before it reaches the brain. By inhibiting peripheral DDC, carbidopa decreases this premature conversion and increases the amount of levodopa available for transport into the central nervous system.

When administered with levodopa, carbidopa increases levodopa plasma levels and prolongs its half-life. It also reduces the amount of levodopa required to achieve a therapeutic response and decreases peripheral dopaminergic adverse effects. Fixed-dose combinations of carbidopa/levodopa are widely used, and combinations including entacapone are also marketed. Other DDC inhibitors include benserazide, difluoromethyldopa, and α-methyldopa.

== Chemistry ==
Carbidopa is chemically designated as N-amino-α-methyl-3-hydroxy-L-tyrosine monohydrate, with the empirical formula C_{10}H_{14}N_{2}O_{4}·H_{2}O and a molecular weight of 244.3 (anhydrous). It is a white, crystalline compound that is slightly soluble in water.

== Synthesis ==
Carbidopa synthesis: ; Chemerda et al., U.S. patent 3,462,536 (to Merck & Co.). L-form.

The synthesis begins with a modified Strecker reaction using hydrazine and potassium cyanide on arylacetone (1) to give 2. This is then hydrolyzed with cold hydrochloric acid (HCl) to give carboxamide 3. More vigorous hydrolysis with 48% hydrobromic acid (HBr) cleaves both the amide bond and the aryl ether groups to produce carbidopa (4).
