= Aromatic L-amino acid decarboxylase inhibitor =

Type of medication

Peripheral inhibitors of DOPA decarboxylase (AADC) block one of two ways levodopa can be inactivated before it reaches the central nervous system and is activated to dopamine. (Dopamine in the periphery only causes side effects, no antiparkinson effect.) COMT inhibitors block the second way.

An aromatic L-amino acid decarboxylase inhibitor (synonyms: DOPA decarboxylase inhibitor, extracerebral decarboxylase inhibitor, DDCI and AAADI) is a medication of type enzyme inhibitor which inhibits the synthesis of dopamine by the enzyme aromatic L-amino acid decarboxylase (AADC, AAAD, or DOPA decarboxylase). It is used to inhibit the decarboxylation of L-DOPA to dopamine outside the brain, i.e. in the blood. This is primarily co-administered with L-DOPA to combat Parkinson's disease. Administration can prevent common side-effects, such as nausea and vomiting, as a result of interaction with D_{2} receptors in the vomiting center (or cheomoreceptor trigger zone) located outside the blood–brain barrier.

Examples of extracerebral decarboxylase inhibitors include carbidopa and benserazide.

== Indications ==
Peripherally selective DDCIs incapable of crossing the protective blood–brain barrier (BBB) are used in augmentation of L-DOPA (levodopa) in the treatment of Parkinson's disease (PD) to block the conversion of L-DOPA into dopamine outside the brain, for the purpose of reducing adverse side effects. Combined L-DOPA and DDCI therapy does not inherently decrease peripheral cardiovascular side effects of L-DOPA administration; however, combined therapy potentiates the central effects of L-DOPA by decreasing the dose-dependency 4-5 fold, therein allowing for effective Parkinson's disease treatment without cardiovascular risk associated with high peripheral dopamine.

== List of DDCIs ==
- Benserazide (Madopar, Prolopa, Modopar, Madopark, Neodopasol, EC-Doparyl, etc.)
- Carbidopa (Lodosyn, Sinemet, Pharmacopa, Atamet, Stalevo, etc.)
- Methyldopa (Aldomet, Aldoril, Dopamet, Dopegyt, etc.)
- alpha-Difluoromethyl-DOPA (DFMD)
- 3',4',5,7-Tetrahydroxy-8-methoxyisoflavone [58262-89-8]
- Epigallocatechin gallate (EGCG)
- Epigallocatechin (EGC)
