= Neluxicapone =

COMT inhibitor

Clinical data
- Drug class: Catechol O-methyltransferase inhibitor

Identifiers
- IUPAC name: 4,5-dihydroxy-2-[(4-methylphenyl)methyl]benzene-1,3-dicarbonitrile
- CAS Number: 1498323-18-4
- PubChem CID: 90015465
- ChemSpider: 68007328
- UNII: ZO0K3RUH9L

Chemical and physical data
- Formula: C_{16}H_{12}N_{2}O_{2}
- Molar mass: 264.284 g·mol^{−1}
- 3D model (JSmol): Interactive image
- SMILES: CC1=CC=C(C=C1)CC2=C(C(=C(C=C2C#N)O)O)C#N
- InChI: InChI=1S/C16H12N2O2/c1-10-2-4-11(5-3-10)6-13-12(8-17)7-15(19)16(20)14(13)9-18/h2-5,7,19-20H,6H2,1H3; Key:GILLLKMLIBNDKV-UHFFFAOYSA-N

Neluxicapone (INN) is a catechol O-methyltransferase (COMT) inhibitor which has not been marketed as of 2024. The drug is a nitrocatechol and is structurally related to other catechol COMT inhibitors like entacapone, tolcapone, and nebicapone. COMT inhibitors are used in conjunction with levodopa in the treatment of Parkinson's disease. Neluxicapone was first described in the literature by 2018. Its INN was designated by the World Health Organization (WHO) in 2019.
