= 5-Nitrovanillin =

Names
- IUPAC name 4-hydroxy-3-methoxy-5-nitrobenzaldehyde

Identifiers
CAS Number	6635-20-7
3D model (JSmol)	Interactive image
Beilstein Reference	1973746
ChEBI	CHEBI:48385
ChemSpider	73200
ECHA InfoCard	100.026.940
EC Number	229-633-2
PubChem CID	81134
UNII	G6SQ47R9WB
CompTox Dashboard (EPA)	DTXSID2075344
- InChI: InChI=1S/C8H7NO5/c1-14-7-3-5(4-10)2-6(8(7)11)9(12)13/h2-4,11H,1H3 Key: ZEHYRTJBFMZHCY-UHFFFAOYSA-N
- SMILES: COC1=CC(=CC(=C1O)[N+](=O)[O-])C=O

Properties
Chemical formula	C_{8}H_{7}NO_{5}
Molar mass	197.14 g·mol^{−1}
Appearance	yellow powder
Melting point	172–175 °C (342–347 °F; 445–448 K)
Boiling point	212.3 °C (414.1 °F; 485.4 K)
log P	0.301

Hazards
- GHS labelling
Pictograms	(GHS07: Exclamation mark)
Signal word	Warning
Hazard statements	H315, H319
Precautionary statements	P264, P280, P302+P352, P305+P351+P338, P332+P313, P337+P313
Flash point	97 °C (207 °F; 370 K)
- Except where otherwise noted, data are given for materials in their standard state (at 25 °C [77 °F], 100 kPa). Infobox references

5-Nitrovanillin (4-hydroxy-3-methoxy-5-nitrobenzaldehyde) is a derivative of vanillin in which the hydrogen ortho- to the hydroxy group is substituted by a nitro group. Because it contains many reactive functional groups – in addition to the nitro group, a hydroxyl group, a methoxy group and an aldehyde group are present – 5-nitrovanillin is suitable as a starting material for the synthesis of phenethylamines, for coenzyme Q and for the inhibitors of catechol-O-methyltransferase (COMT inhibitors) that are effective against Parkinson's disease.

== Properties ==
5-Nitrovanillin is a yellow crystalline solid with a characteristic odor. It is sparingly soluble in water, readily soluble in alkali solutions on heating and in methanol. When recrystallized from acetic acid, the substance precipitates as pale yellow plate-like crystals, and from ethanol as needle-like crystals.

== Preparation ==
5-Nitrovanillin is obtained upon nitration of vanillin with concentrated nitric acid in glacial acetic acid with a 75% yield.

Synthesis of 5-nitrovanillin

With acetyl nitrate as the nitrating agent, yields of up to 88% are obtained in the presence of silica gel.

== Uses ==
5-Nitrovanillin was patented as a yellow hair dye in combination with other nitrobenzene dyes for consistent blonde to brown shades.

Because of the low solubility of 5-nitrovanillin in water, the potassium salt, which is readily soluble in water, is used for methylation. It is reacted with dimethyl sulfate to form 3,4-dimethoxy-5-nitrobenzaldehyde (5-nitroveratraldehyde) in 91% yield.

Methylation of 5-nitrovanillin

In early work on psychoactive phenethylamines, 3,4-dimethoxy-5-nitrobenzaldehyde was condensed with nitromethane in a Knoevenagel reaction to give the corresponding nitrostyrene, which is reduced electrochemically to yield the corresponding β-phenylethylamine.

Knoevenagel condensation with 5-nitrovanillin

An important intermediate for the chemical synthesis of coenzyme Q is 2,3-dimethoxy-5-methyl-1,4-benzoquinone, which is accessible in a four-step synthesis from 5-nitrovanillin via 3,4-dimethoxy-5-nitrobenzaldehyde. Demethylation of 5-nitrovanillin by ether cleavage using hydrobromic acid or using lithium hydroxide and thiophenol in NMP leads to 3,4-dihydroxy-5-nitrobenzaldehyde (DHNB), which is being discussed as an active ingredient for the treatment of hyperuricemia and gout.

Demethylation of 5-nitrovanillin

3,4-Dihydroxy-5-nitrobenzaldehyde (DHNB) has gained greater importance as a precursor for the synthesis of the COMT inhibitor entacapone for the treatment of Parkinson's disease. A more recent patent application describes a synthetic route for the active ingredient opicapone, which has been approved in the EU since 2016, in which 5-nitrovanilline is initially reacted directly with hydroxylamine hydrochloride in DMSO to form the corresponding nitrile.

First step of the opicapon synthesis

The nitrile obtained reacts with a hydroxamic acid chloride to give a 3,5-disubstituted 1,2,4-oxadiazole as a further intermediate.

Intermediate in the opicapon synthesis

With hydrazides, the aldehyde 5-nitrovanillin forms hydrazones that can be cyclized with Chloramine-T to give substituted 1,3,4-oxadiazoles.
