= Nebicapone =

Abandoned COMT inhibitor

Clinical data
- Other names: BIA 3-202; 3-Nitro-5-phenylacetyl catechol
- Drug class: Catechol O-methyltransferase inhibitor

Identifiers
- IUPAC name: 1-(3,4-dihydroxy-5-nitrophenyl)-2-phenylethanone
- CAS Number: 274925-86-9
- PubChem CID: 9838389
- DrugBank: DB14849
- ChemSpider: 8014109
- UNII: NM2KXJ990T
- ChEMBL: ChEMBL160038
- CompTox Dashboard (EPA): DTXSID30181912

Chemical and physical data
- Formula: C_{14}H_{11}NO_{5}
- Molar mass: 273.244 g·mol^{−1}
- 3D model (JSmol): Interactive image
- SMILES: C1=CC=C(C=C1)CC(=O)C2=CC(=C(C(=C2)O)O)[N+](=O)[O-]
- InChI: InChI=1S/C14H11NO5/c16-12(6-9-4-2-1-3-5-9)10-7-11(15(19)20)14(18)13(17)8-10/h1-5,7-8,17-18H,6H2; Key:MRFOLGFFTUGAEB-UHFFFAOYSA-N

Nebicapone (developmental code name BIA 3-202) is a catechol O-methyltransferase (COMT) inhibitor which was under development for the treatment of Parkinson's disease but was never marketed. It is a nitrocatechol and is structurally related to entacapone, nitecapone, and tolcapone. The drug shows peripheral selectivity and does not significantly act in the brain. In contrast to the centrally penetrant tolcapone, nebicapone does not potentiate the psychostimulant-like effects of amphetamine in animals. Nebicapone was found to be effective for Parkinson's disease in clinical trials. However, it also showed hepatotoxicity, including elevated liver enzymes. As a result, its development was discontinued by 2014. Nebicapone was first described in the scientific literature by 2000.

== See also ==
- List of investigational Parkinson's disease drugs
