= 3-O-Methyldopa =

Names
- IUPAC name 2-Amino-3-(4-hydroxy-3-methoxyphenyl)propanoic acid.
- Other names 3-Methoxytyrosine; 3-Methoxydopa; L-3-O-Methyl-DOPA; 3-Methoxy-L-tyrosine; L-4-Hydroxy-3-methoxyphenylalanine; L-3-Methoxytyrosine; L-3-Methoxy-4-hydroxyphenylalanine

Identifiers
CAS Number	7636-26-2
3D model (JSmol)	Interactive image
ChEBI	CHEBI:82913
ChemSpider	8948
PubChem CID	9307
UNII	SO86T1OB2P
CompTox Dashboard (EPA)	DTXSID401315157
- InChI: InChI=1S/C10H13NO4/c1-15-9-5-6(2-3-8(9)12)4-7(11)10(13)14/h2-3,5,7,12H,4,11H2,1H3,(H,13,14)/t7-/m0/s1 Key: PFDUUKDQEHURQC-ZETCQYMHSA-N; InChI=1/C10H13NO4/c1-15-9-5-6(2-3-8(9)12)4-7(11)10(13)14/h2-3,5,7,12H,4,11H2,1H3,(H,13,14)/t7-/m0/s1 Key: PFDUUKDQEHURQC-ZETCQYMHBZ
- SMILES: COC1=C(C=CC(=C1)C[C@@H](C(=O)O)N)O

Properties
Chemical formula	C_{10}H_{13}NO_{4}
Molar mass	211.217 g·mol^{−1}
- Except where otherwise noted, data are given for materials in their standard state (at 25 °C [77 °F], 100 kPa). Infobox references

3-O-Methyldopa (3-OMD) is one of the most important metabolites of L-DOPA, a drug used in the treatment of the Parkinson's disease.

3-O-methyldopa is produced by the methylation of L-DOPA by the enzyme catechol-O-methyltransferase. The necessary cofactor for this enzymatic reaction is s-adenosyl methionine (SAM). Its half-life (approximately 15 hours) is longer than L-DOPA's half-life, which is about one hour. This means that it is accumulated in the plasma and the brain of chronic L-DOPA therapy patients such as people suffering from Parkinson's disease.

3-OMD is often elevated in the plasma and cerebrospinal fluid of Parkinson's disease patients taking L-DOPA. It's serum levels are also elevated in patients with AADC deficit, making it a useful marker for screening of this disease.

== Effects ==
Recent studies suggest that 3-OMD has some effects on the chronic treatment of L-DOPA. There are some evidences about it:

- Higher levels of dyskinesia.
- L-DOPA related motor dysfunction.
- Inhibition of striatal uptake of tyrosine.
- Competition with L-DOPA for the blood–brain barrier transporter system.
- Inhibition of dopamine release.

== In relation to levodopa ==
The most common and important treatment for Parkinson's disease is L-DOPA, used in all patients at any time of the disease evolution. It produces a decrease in symptoms of the disease. In fact, almost all patients that are treated with this drug show a considerable improvement. However, there is a controversy of whether L-DOPA and 3-OMD may be toxic.

Some studies have proposed that 3-OMD increases homocysteine levels, and this amino acid induces cardiovascular disease and neuronal damage. Some other toxic effects could be oxidative DNA damage which can cause cell death, a decrease in locomotor activities and diminishment in mitochondrial membrane potential.

== Modulation of 3-OMD levels in blood ==
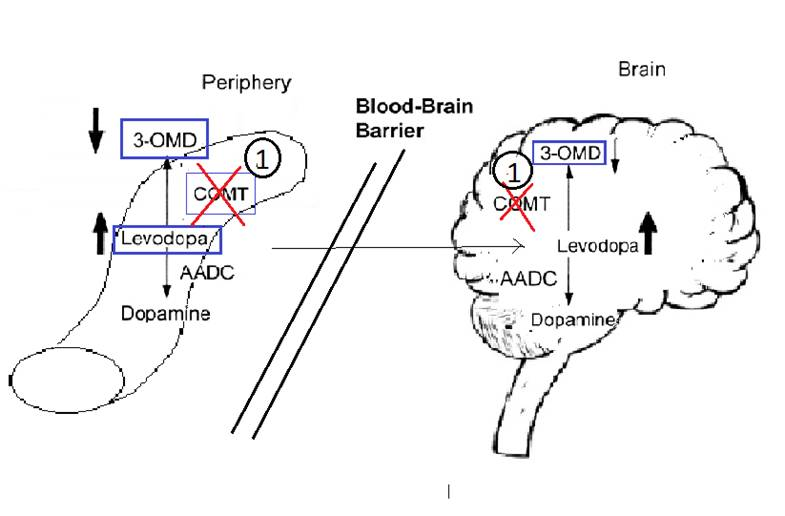
Action of tolcapone (1) inhibiting the activity of COMT modifying the levels of L-DOPA and 3-OMD.

As we know, it is necessary to produce the passage of L-DOPA administered to the blood brain barrier (BBB) to supplement the lack of dopamine suffered by patients with Parkinson's. Due to the high peripheral degradation rate of L-DOPA, high doses are required to improve the levels of this enzyme in blood brain barrier. Those increments are often associated with dopaminergic side effects. For this reason, several studies reported some mechanisms that can prolong the concentration of L-DOPA. Compounds capable of decreasing 3-O-methyldopa, like entacapone, tolcapone and opicapone (COMT inhibitors), when administered in combination with L-DOPA, lead to prolonged availability of this drug, thereby prolonging its effects.

On the other hand, the possibility of blocking peripheral decarboxylation by adding an aromatic amino acid decarboxylase (AADC) inhibitor has been studied. These effects increase the methylation of L-DOPA and increase concentrations of 3-O-methyldopa. Clivel Charlton et al., demonstrate that 3-OMD accumulation from long-term L-DOPA treatment may be involved in the adverse effects of L-DOPA therapy, although more studies are needed to corroborate it.

== Metabolic pathway ==
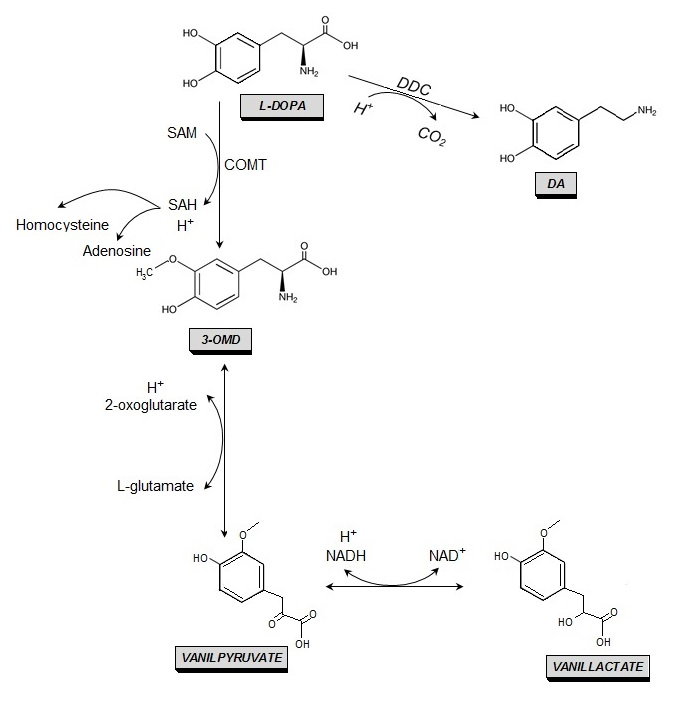
Dopamine and 3-OMD synthesis until final conversion to vanillactate from L-dopamine degradation. Abbreviations: DDC, dopa decarboxylase; DA, dopamine; COMT: catechol-O-methyl transferase; 3-OMD, 3-O-methyldopa; SAM, S-adenosylmethionine; SAH, S-adenosylhomocysteine.

3-O-methyldopa is a major metabolite of L-3,4-dihydroxyphenylalanine (L-DOPA) and is formed by catechol-O-methyltransferase (COMT).

One of the L-DOPA's metabolic pathways is the decarboxylation and the other is the O-methylation.

L-DOPA has the main role in the metabolic pathway as a metabolite in the biosynthesis of dopamine. This reaction happen in the process of decarboxylation by aromatic amino acid decarboxylase (AADC) also called dopa-descarboxilasa.

Furthermore, L-DOPA also can be methylated in the methylation process to 3-O-methyldopa. DDC acting as decarboxylase inhibitor makes COMT main metabolic pathway catalyzing this conversion of Levodopa.

The catabolism of L-DOPA to synthesize 3-OMD

This process is catalyzed by catechol O-methyltransferase methylates (COMT). The action of the enzyme makes it possible the reaction happens. This metabolite of L-DOPA formed, 3-OMD, is transaminated to vanilpyruvate by tyrosine aminotransferase. Vanilpyruvate is reduced to the final conversion: venillactate which are the same, predominantly by aromatic α-keto acid reductase and also by lactate dehydrogenase.

== See also ==
- L-DOPA
- Entacapone
- Tolcapone
- Opicapone
- Catechol-O-methyl transferase
- Parkinson's disease
