= Management of Parkinson's disease =

Treatment of Parkinson's disease

- Specialty: Neurology

In the management of Parkinson's disease, due to the chronic nature of Parkinson's disease (PD), a broad-based program is needed that includes patient and family education, support-group services, general wellness maintenance, exercise, and nutrition. At present, no cure for the disease is known, but medications or surgery can provide relief from the symptoms.

While many medications treat Parkinson's, none actually reverses the effects of the disease. Furthermore, the gold-standard treatment varies with the disease state. People with Parkinson's, therefore, often must take a variety of medications to manage the disease's symptoms. Several medications currently in development seek to better address motor fluctuations and nonmotor symptoms of PD. However, none is yet on the market with specific approval to treat Parkinson's.

== Medication ==
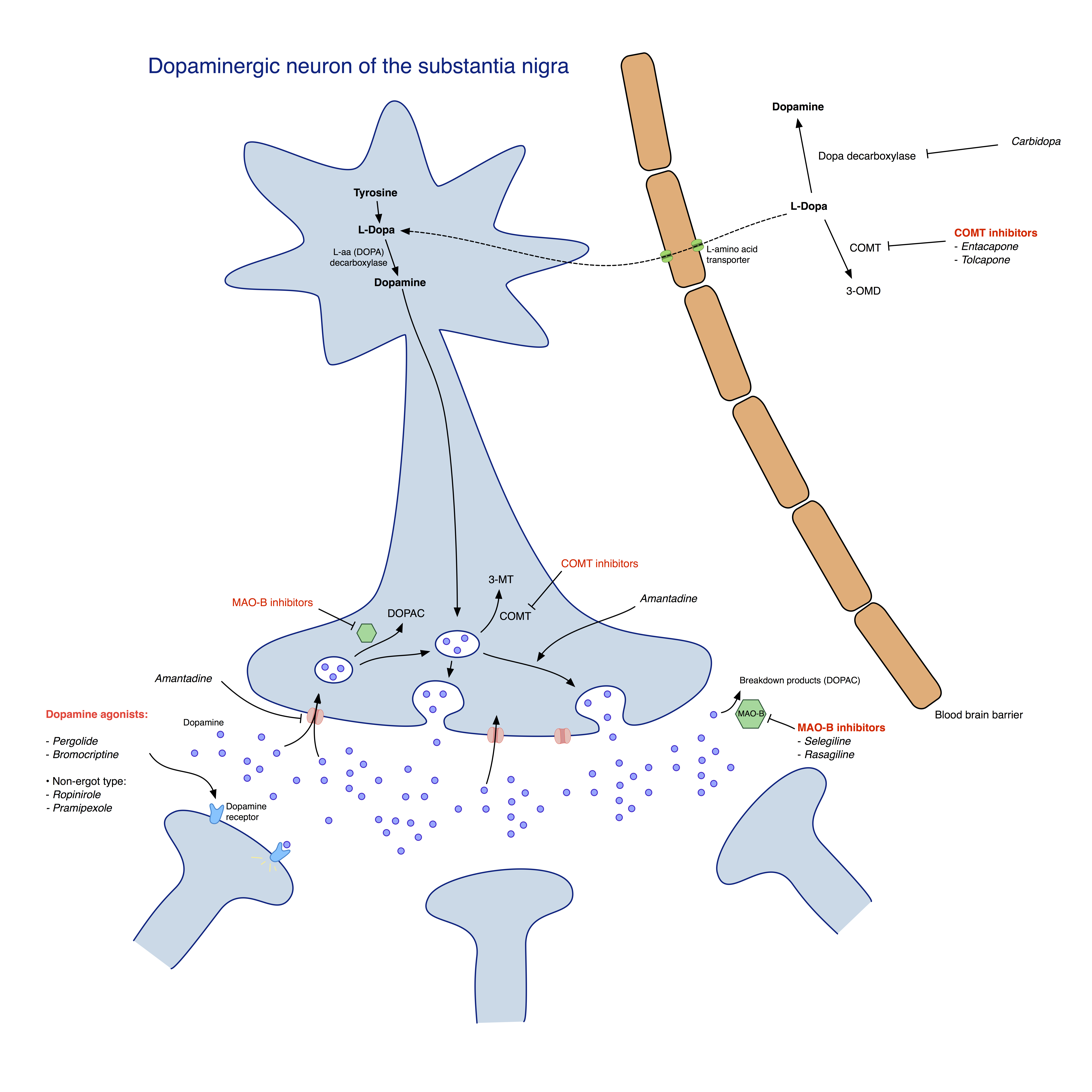
Pharmacological treatment of Parkinson's disease

The main families of drugs useful for treating motor symptoms are levodopa, dopamine agonists, and MAO-B inhibitors. The most commonly used treatment approach varies depending on the disease stage. Two phases are usually distinguished: an initial phase in which the individual with PD has already developed some disability which requires pharmacological treatment, and a second stage in which the patient develops motor complications related to levodopa usage. Treatment in the initial state aims to attain an optimal tradeoff between good management of symptoms and side effects resulting from enhancement of dopaminergic function. The start of L-DOPA treatment can be delayed by using other medications such as MAO-B inhibitors and dopamine agonists, in the hope of delaying the onset of dyskinesias. In the second stage, the aim is to reduce symptoms while controlling fluctuations of the response to medication. Sudden withdrawals from medication, and overuse by some patients, also must be controlled. When medications are not enough to control symptoms, surgical techniques such as deep brain stimulation can relieve the associated movement disorders.

=== Levodopa ===
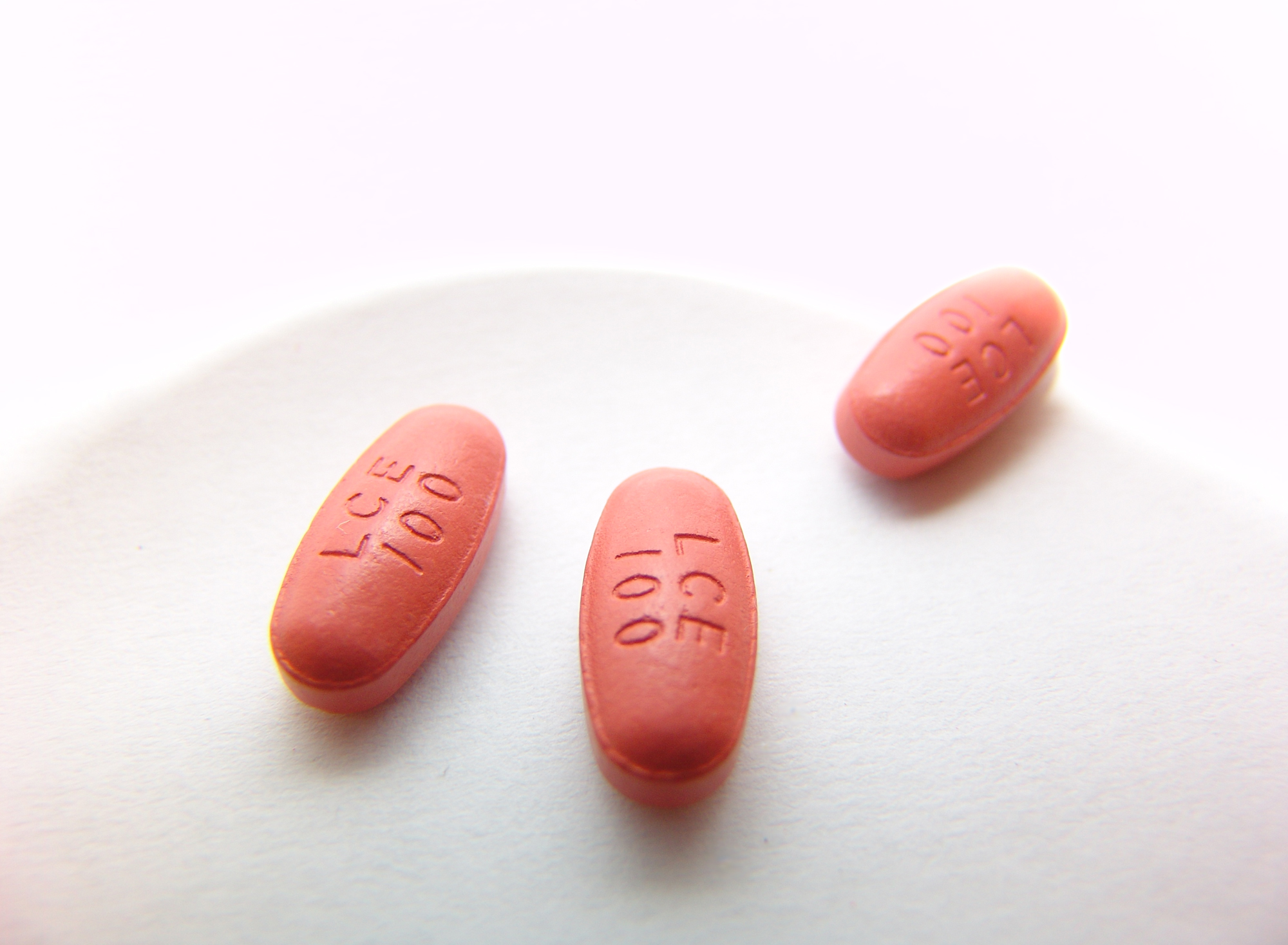
Stalevo, a commercial preparation combining entacapone, levodopa, and carbidopa for treatment of Parkinson's disease

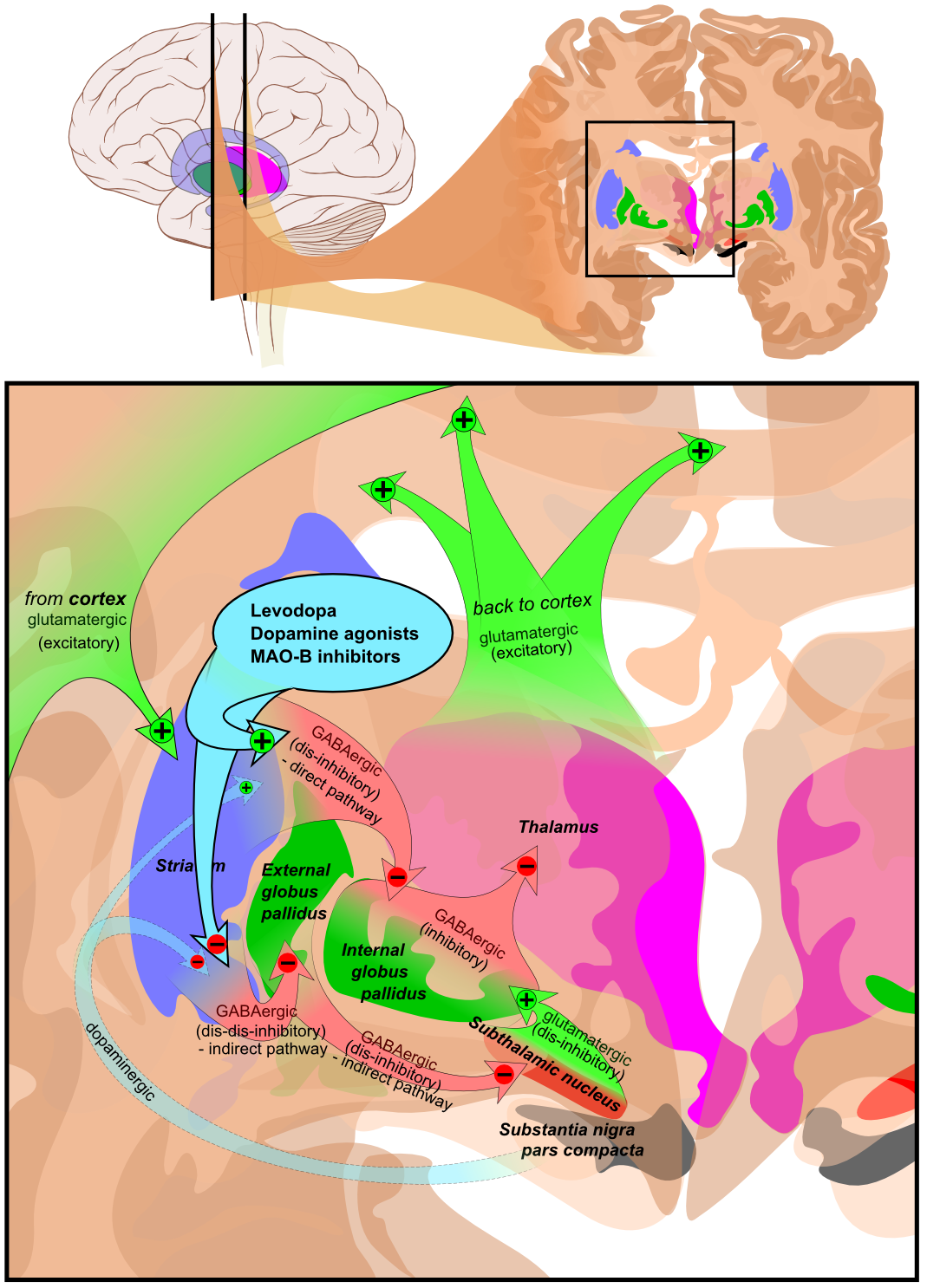
Circuits of the basal ganglia in treatment of Parkinson's disease – model of the effect of medication on motor symptoms: levodopa, dopamine agonists and MAO-B inhibitors stimulate excitatory signals from the thalamus to the cerebral cortex by effects on the striatum, compensating for decreased dopaminergic signals from substantia nigra (seen at bottom right).

Levodopa (or L-DOPA) has been the most widely used treatment for over 30 years. L-DOPA is transformed into dopamine in the dopaminergic neurons by dopa-decarboxylase. Since motor symptoms are produced by a lack of dopamine in the substantia nigra, the administration of L-DOPA temporarily diminishes the motor symptoms.

Only 5–10% of L-DOPA crosses the blood–brain barrier. The remainder is often metabolised to dopamine elsewhere, causing a wide variety of side effects including nausea, dyskinesias, and stiffness. Carbidopa and benserazide are peripheral dopa decarboxylase inhibitors. They inhibit the metabolism of L-DOPA in the periphery, thereby increasing levodopa delivery to the central nervous system. They are generally given as combination preparations with levodopa. Existing preparations are carbidopa/levodopa (co-careldopa, trade names Sinemet, Pharmacopa, Atamet) and benserazide/levodopa (co-beneldopa, trade name Madopar). Levodopa has also been related to a dopamine dysregulation syndrome, which is a compulsive overuse of the medication, and punding.

Controlled, slow-release versions of Sinemet and Madopar spread out the effect of the levodopa. Duodopa is a combination of levodopa and carbidopa. Slow-release levodopa preparations have not shown an increased control of motor symptoms or motor complications when compared to immediate-release preparations.

Tolcapone inhibits the catechol-O-methyltransferase (COMT) enzyme, which degrades dopamine and levadopa, thereby prolonging the therapeutic effects of levodopa. It, alongside inhibitors of peripheral dopa decarboxylase, have been used to complement levodopa. However, due to its possible side effects such as liver failure, it is limited in its availability. A similar drug, entacapone, has not been shown to cause significant alterations of liver function and maintains adequate inhibition of COMT over time. Entacapone is available for treatment alone (COMTan) or combined with carbidopa and levodopa (Stalevo).

Long term usage of levodopa treatment is associated with the development of motor complications. The complications usually appear first as wearing-off, in which the dose effect fades before the next dose assumption is scheduled, and later by less predictable on-off phenomenon in which patients develop an ON-state with dyskinesia and an OFF state with akinesia. Roughly half of the patients with Parkinson's disease treated with levodopa develop motor fluctuations within the first 5 years of the treatment. Both pharmacokinetic and pharmacodynamic mechanism are the reason why the complications arise: decreasing dopamine storage capacity due to progressive loss of nigrostriatal terminals causes a pulsatile rather than steady stimulation. Risk can also be increased by a younger age disease onset, longer disease duration and higher levodopa dose.

For this reason, levodopa doses are kept as low as possible while maintaining functionality. Delaying the initiation of dopatherapy, using instead alternatives for some time, is also common practice. A former strategy to reduce motor complications was to withdraw patients from L-DOPA for some time. It is discouraged now since it can bring dangerous side effects such as neuroleptic malignant syndrome. Most people eventually need levodopa and later develop motor complications.

Redistribution of levodopa dosage which may mean smaller, more frequent doses, or larger less frequent increments, may be helpful in controlling oscillations in some patients. Dietary protein restriction and the use of selegiline and bromocriptine may also temporarily improve motor fluctuations. New approaches to management include:

- Continuous subcutaneous apomorphine infusion delivered via a portable pump
- Duodopa or Levodopa-carbidopa intestinal gel (LCIG), a methylcellulose-based suspension of levodopa and carbidopa delivered in a continuous way into the duodenum or jejunum through a portable pump and PEG-J tube system.
- Produodopa, a soluble prodrug formulation of fosfolevodopa/foscarbidopa developed for a 24 hour subcutaneous infusion. After the infusion, the prodrug is converted by phosphatases into active levodopa and carbidopa that manage to stabilize their concentration in the blood.
- Levodopa-carbidopa microtablets (LC-5), marketed as Flexilev, are small dispersible low-dose tablets consisting of 5 mg levodopa and 1.25 carbidopa per tablet. The tablets are designed for frequent oral dosing throughout the day in order to maintain stable levodopa concentrations in the blood via fine granularity.
- Deep brain stimulation, often of the subthalamic nucleus, for eligible patients with fluctuations not responsive to the medications. It can substantially reduce off-time and dyskinesia, though it carries surgical risks.

In animal models it was shown that the intake of adenosine receptor antagonists together with levodopa can amplify its therapeutic effects.

=== Dopamine agonists ===
Dopamine agonists in the brain have a similar effect to levodopa since they bind to dopaminergic postsynaptic receptors. Dopamine agonists were initially used for patients experiencing on-off fluctuations and dyskinesias as a complementary therapy to levodopa, but they are now mainly used on their own as an initial therapy for motor symptoms with the aim of delaying motor complications. When used in late PD, they are useful at reducing the off periods. Dopamine agonists include bromocriptine, pergolide, pramipexole, ropinirole, piribedil, cabergoline, apomorphine, and lisuride.

Agonists produce significant, although mild, side effects including somnolence, hallucinations, insomnia, nausea, and constipation. Sometimes, side effects appear even at the minimal clinically efficacious dose, leading the physician to search for a different agonist or kind of drug. When compared with levodopa, while they delay motor complications, they control worse symptoms. Nevertheless, they are usually effective enough to manage symptoms in the initial years. They are also more expensive. Dyskinesias with dopamine agonists are rare in younger patients, but along other side effects, more common in older patients. All this has led to agonists being the preferential initial treatment for the former as opposed to levodopa in the latter. Agonists at higher doses have also been related to a wide variety of impulse-control disorders.

Apomorphine, which is a dopamine agonist not orally administered, may be used to reduce off periods and dyskinesia in late PD. Since secondary effects such as confusion and hallucinations are not rare, patients under apomorphine treatment should be closely monitored. Apomorphine can be administered by subcutaneous injection using a small pump which is carried by the patient. A low dose is automatically administered throughout the day, reducing the fluctuations of motor symptoms by providing a steady dose of dopaminergic stimulation. After an initial "apomorphine challenge" in hospital to test its effectiveness and brief patient and primary caregiver (often a spouse or partner), the latter of whom takes over maintenance of the pump. The injection site must be changed daily and rotated around the body to avoid the formation of nodules. Apomorphine is also available in a more acute dose as an autoinjector pen for emergency doses such as after a fall or first thing in the morning. Nausea and vomiting are common, and may require domperidone (an antiemetic).

In a study evaluating the efficacy of dopamine agonists compared to levodopa, the results showed patients who took dopamine agonists were less likely to develop dyskinesia, dystonia, and motor fluctuations, although were more likely to discontinue therapy due to negative side effects such as nausea, edema, constipation, etc.

=== MAO-B inhibitors ===
Monoamine oxidase inhibitors (selegiline and rasagiline) increase the level of dopamine in the basal ganglia by blocking its metabolization. They inhibit monoamine oxidase-B (MAO-B) which breaks down dopamine secreted by the dopaminergic neurons. Therefore, reducing MAO-B results in higher quantities of L-DOPA in the striatum. Similarly to dopamine agonists, MAO-B inhibitors improve motor symptoms and delay the need of taking levodopa when used as monotherapy in the first stages of the disease, but produce more adverse effects and are less effective than levodopa. Evidence on their efficacy in the advanced stage is reduced, although it points towards them being useful to reduce fluctuations between on and off periods. Although an initial study indicated selegiline in combination with levodopa increased the risk of death, this has been later disproven.

Metabolites of selegiline include L-amphetamine and L-methamphetamine (not to be confused with the more potent dextrorotary isomers). This might result in side effects such as insomnia. Another side effect of the combination can be stomatitis. Unlike other nonselective monoamine oxidase inhibitors, tyramine-containing foods do not cause a hypertensive crisis.

=== Other drugs ===
Some evidence indicates other drugs such as amantadine and anticholinergics may be useful as treatment of motor symptoms in early and late PD, but since the quality of evidence on efficacy is reduced, they are not first-choice treatments. In addition to motor symptoms, PD is accompanied by a range of different symptoms. Different compounds are used to improve some of these problems. Examples are the use of clozapine for psychosis, cholinesterase inhibitors for dementia, modafinil for day somnolence, and atomoxetine for executive dysfunction.

One study suggests Botulinum neurotoxin(BoNT) is useful in treating several motor and non-motor symptoms of Parkinson's. However, this form of treatment is also not considered a first-choice treatment but is usually used to treat a specific symptom of PD or when typical treatment for PD is insufficient. These specific symptoms include Gastrointestinal Dysfunction, eye twitching, and Sialorrhea also known as excessive salivating or drooling. There have been several studies that have established efficacy of BoNT, particularly for Sialorrhea and Gastrointestinal Dysfunction.

A preliminary study indicates taking donepezil (Aricept) may help prevent falls in people with Parkinson's. Donepezil boosts the levels of the neurotransmitter acetylcholine, and is currently an approved therapy for the cognitive symptoms of Alzheimer's disease. In the study, participants taking donepezil experienced falls half as often as those taking a placebo, and those who previously fell the most showed the most improvement.

The introduction of clozapine (Clozaril) represents a breakthrough in the treatment of psychotic symptoms of PD. Prior to its introduction, treatment of psychotic symptoms relied on reduction of dopamine therapy or treatment with first generation antipsychotics, all of which worsened motor function. Other atypical antipsychotics useful in treatment include quetiapine (Seroquel), ziprasidone (Geodon), aripiprazole (Abilify), and paliperidone (Invega). Clozapine is believed to have the highest efficacy and lowest risk of extrapyramidal side effect.

=== Getting medication on time ===
Parkinson's patients who do not get the correct medicine at the right time when they are in hospital, (frequently they are in hospital due to unrelated illnesses) sometimes cannot talk or walk. The health of a majority deteriorated due to unsatisfactory medication management when they are in hospital. Parkinson's UK believes the NHS could save up to £10m a year and improve the care of Parkinson's patients if mandatory training is introduced for all hospital staff.

Parkinson UK found:

- "Nearly two thirds of people who have Parkinson's don't always get their medication on time in hospital."
- "More than three quarters of people with Parkinson's that we asked reported that their health deteriorated as a result of poor medication management in hospital."
- "Only 21% of respondents told us they got their medication on time without having to remind hospital staff."

== Diet ==
Muscles and nerves that control the digestive process may be affected by PD, so it is common to experience constipation and gastroparesis (food remaining in the stomach for a longer period of time than normal). A balanced diet is recommended to help improve digestion. Diet should include high-fiber foods and plenty of water. Levodopa and proteins use the same transportation system in the intestine and the blood–brain barrier, competing between them for access. When taken together, the consequences of such competition is a reduced effectiveness of the drug. Therefore, when levodopa is introduced, excessive proteins are discouraged, while in advanced stages, additional intake of low-protein products such as bread or pasta is recommended for similar reasons. To minimize interaction with proteins, levodopa is recommended to be taken 30 minutes before meals. At the same time, regimens for PD restrict proteins during breakfast and lunch and are usually taken at dinner. As the disease advances, dysphagia may appear. In such cases, specific measures include the use of thickening agents for liquid intake, special postures when eating, and gastrostomy in the worst cases.

== Surgery ==
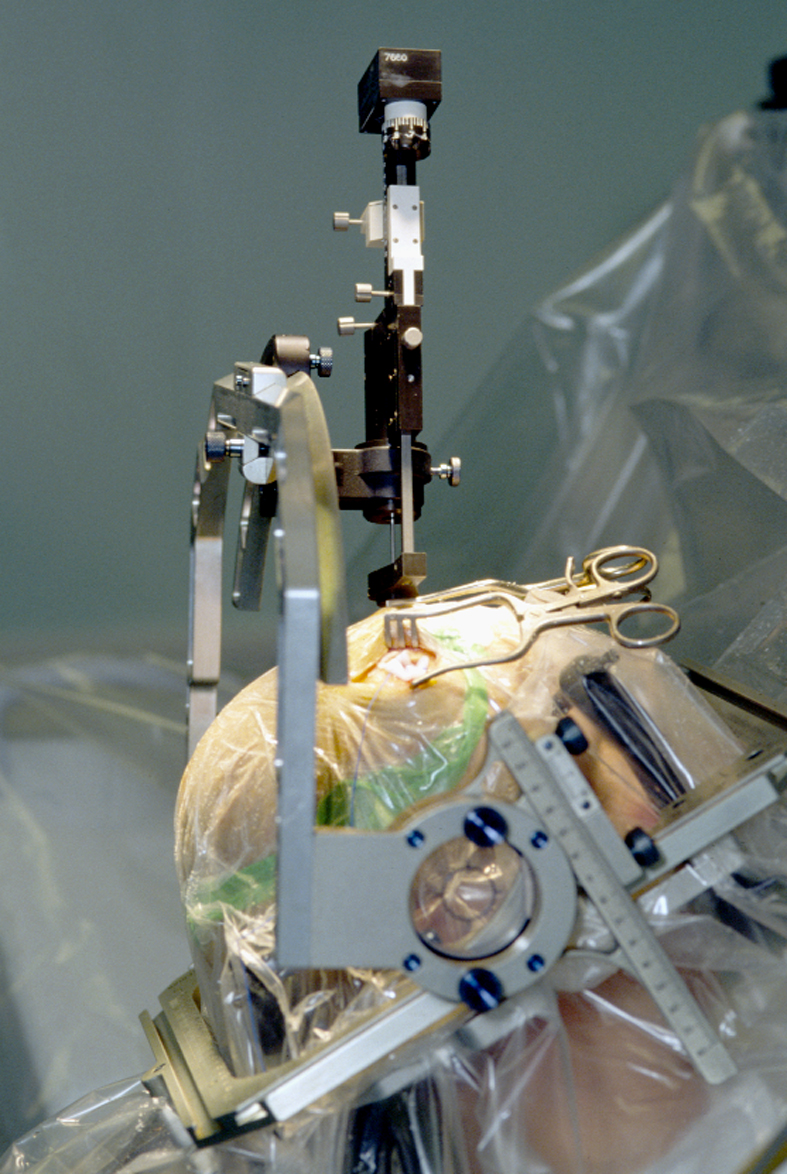
Illustration showing an electrode placed deep-seated in the brain

Treating PD with surgery was once a common practice, but after the discovery of levodopa, surgery was restricted to only a few cases. Studies in the past few decades have led to great improvements in surgical techniques, and surgery is again being used in people with advanced PD for whom drug therapy is no longer sufficient.

Less than 10% of those with PD qualify as suitable candidates for a surgical response. The three different mechanisms of surgical response for PD are: ablative surgery, (the irreversible burning or freezing of brain tissue), stimulation surgery or deep brain stimulation (DBS), and transplantation or restorative surgery.

Target areas for DBS or lesions include the thalamus, the globus pallidus (the lesion technique being called pallidotomy), or the subthalamic nucleus.

=== Neuroablative lesion surgery ===
Neuroablative lesion surgery locates and destroys, by heat, the parts of the brain associated with producing Parkinsonian neurological symptoms. The procedures generally involve a thalamotomy and/or pallidotomy. A thalamotomy is the destruction of a part of the thalamus, in particular the ventralis intermedius, to suppress tremor in 80-90% of patients. If rigidity and akinesia are apparent, the subthalamis nucleus is then the site of ablation.

A pallidotomy involves the destruction of the globus pallidus, in particular the globus pallidus interna, in patients with Parkinson's who have rigidity and akinesia.

Because it is difficult to accurately measure the amount of tissue to be destroyed, tremors not uncommonly persist through multiple courses of surgery, since tissue is irreversibly damaged and removed and testing smaller areas of tissue is safer to prevent serious complications, such as a stroke or paralysis.. This method has been generally replaced by deep brain surgery.

=== Deep brain stimulation ===
Deep brain stimulation (DBS) is presently the most used method of surgical treatment because it does not destroy brain tissue, it is reversible, and it can be tailored to individuals at their particular stage of disease. DBS employs three hardware components: a neurostimulator, also called an implanted pulse generator (IPG), which generates electrical impulses used to modulate neural activity, a lead wire which directs the impulses to a number of metallic electrodes towards the tip of the lead near the stimulation target, and an extension wire that connects the lead to the IPG. The IPG, which is battery-powered and encased in titanium, is traditionally implanted under the collarbone, and is connected by the subcutaneous extension to the lead, which extends from outside the skull under the scalp down into the brain to the target of stimulation. The IPG, or the entire three-component system, are sometimes referred to as a brain pacemaker, due to the precedence and renown of cardiac pacemakers and similarities in the components of both types of systems.

The preoperative targeting of proper implantation sites can be accomplished by the indirect and direct methods. The indirect method uses computer tomography, magnetic resonance imaging, or ventriculography to locate the anterior and posterior commissures and then employs predetermined coordinates and distances from the intercommissural line to define the target area. Subsequent histologically defined atlas maps can also be used to verify the target area. The direct method provides visualization and targeting of deep nuclei by applying stereotactic preoperative MRI, which unlike the indirect method, takes into account the anatomic variation of the nuclei's size, position, and functional segregation amongst individuals.

Electrophysial functional mapping, a tool used in both methods to verify the target nuclei, has come under scrutiny due to its associated risks of hemorrhages, dysarthria or tetanic contractions. Recently, susceptibility-weighted imaging, a type of MRI, has shown incredible power in its ability to distinguish these deep brain nuclei and is being used in DBS to reduce the overuse of EFM.

DBS is recommended to PD patients without important neuropsychiatric contraindications who have motor fluctuations and tremor badly controlled by medication, or to those who are intolerant to medication.

DBS is effective in suppressing symptoms of PD, especially tremor. A recent clinical study led to recommendations on identifying which Parkinson's patients are most likely to benefit from DBS.

== Rehabilitation ==
Studies of rehabilitation in Parkinson's disease are scarce and are of low quality. Partial evidence indicates speech or mobility problems can improve with rehabilitation. Regular physical exercise and/or therapy can be beneficial to maintain and improve mobility, flexibility, strength, gait speed, and quality of life. Exercise may also improve constipation. Exercise interventions have been shown to benefit patients with Parkinson's disease in regards to physical functioning, health-related quality of life, and balance and fall risk. In a review of 14 studies examining the effects of exercise on persons with Parkinson's disease, no adverse events or side effects occurred following any of the exercise interventions, a more recent, larger review in 2023 similar results were found. Five proposed mechanisms by which exercise enhances neuroplasticity are known. Intensive activity maximizes synaptic plasticity; complex activities promote greater structural adaptation; activities that are rewarding increase dopamine levels and therefore promote learning/relearning; dopaminergic neurones are highly responsive to exercise and inactivity ("use it or lose it"); and where exercise is introduced at an early stage of the disease, progression can be slowed. One of the most widely practiced treatments for speech disorders associated with Parkinson's disease is the Lee Silverman voice treatment (LSVT), which focuses on increasing vocal loudness and has an intensive approach of one month. Speech therapy and specifically LSVT may improve voice and speech function. Occupational therapy (OT) aims to promote health and quality of life by helping people with the disease to participate in as many activities of their daily living as possible. Few studies have been conducted on the effectiveness of OT and their quality is poor, although some indication shows it may improve motor skills and quality of life for the duration of the therapy.

For monitoring patients with Parkinson's disease, research teams are examining whether virtual house calls can replace visits to clinical facilities. In a trial of such video visits, patients preferred the remote specialist after 1 year. The home care was considered convenient but requires access to and familiarity with Internet-enabled technologies.

=== Exercise ===
Regular physical exercise with or without physiotherapy can be beneficial to maintain and improve mobility, flexibility, strength, gait speed, and quality of life. Parkinson's Disease often causes sedentary behaviours resulting in lower quality of life in the long term. In terms of improving flexibility and range of motion for patients experiencing rigidity, generalized relaxation techniques such as gentle rocking have been found to decrease excessive muscle tension. Other effective techniques to promote relaxation include slow rotational movements of the extremities and trunk, rhythmic initiation, diaphragmatic breathing, and meditation techniques. Common changes in gait associated with the disease such as hypokinesia (slowness of movement), shuffling and decreased arm swing are addressed by a variety of strategies to improve functional mobility and safety. Goals with respect to gait during rehabilitation programs include improving gait speed, base of support, stride length, trunk and arm swing movement. Strategies include utilizing assistive equipment (pole walking and treadmill walking), verbal cueing (manual, visual and auditory), exercises (marching and PNF patterns) and varying environments (surfaces, inputs, open vs. closed).

Strengthening exercises have led to improvements in strength and motor functions in patients with primary muscular weakness and weakness related to inactivity in cases of mild to moderate Parkinson's disease. Patients perform exercises when at their best, 45 minutes to one hour after medication. An 8-week resistance training study geared towards the lower legs found that patients with Parkinson's Disease gained abdominal strength, and improved in their stride length, walking velocity and postural angles. Also, due to the forward flexed posture and respiratory dysfunctions in advanced Parkinson's disease, deep diaphragmatic breathing exercises are beneficial for improving chest wall mobility and vital capacity. Exercise may correct constipation.

Exercise training on a vibratory platform, also called whole body vibration (WBV) training, has been recently introduced as a training tool complementing standard physical rehabilitation programs for people with Parkinson's disease. Compared to no intervention, single sessions of WBV have resulted in improved motor ability, as reflected by Unified Parkinson's Disease Rating Scale (UPDRS) tremor and rigidity scores. However, longer-term (3–5 weeks) WBV programs have not led to improved UPDRS motor scores compared to conventional exercises. Furthermore, multiple sessions of WBV have failed to enhance mobility measures (i.e., the Timed Up and Go Test and 10-Meter Walking Test) in people with Parkinson's disease. A recent review deemed that the evidence of the effects of WBV training on sensorimotor and functional performance remains inconclusive.

Newer data has provided another benefit of exercise for patients with Parkinson's disease. The external and internal stressors provided by engaging in exercise induce production of brain neurotrophic factors. This finding is significant because it provides evidence that exercise contributes to neuroplasticity which is especially beneficial in a neurodegenerative disease such as Parkinson's disease. Another study reported that regular aerobic exercise increases brain derived neurotrophic factor in patients with either Parkinson's, multiple sclerosis, or people who have had a stroke. Exercise has additional benefits to the central and peripheral nervous system in Parkinson's disease, including pain management. Pain is a common, but underdiscussed symptom. Central neuropathic pain is characterized by tingling or burning of a nerve and is not due to the musculoskeletal decline that occurs in Parkinson's disease, rather, it is caused by the disease process within the brain.

=== Psychological treatments ===
Psychological treatment is based on cognitive-behavioral interventions. Cognitive behavioral therapy is confirmed as efficient for treatment of parkinsonian pain, insomnia, anxiety, depression, and impulse control disorders. Treating Parkinson's disease engages a multidisciplinary approach, and includes a psychologist, because motor symptoms can be worsened by psychosocial factors like anxiety, phobia, and panic attacks. Psychological treatment is tailored to each individual, based on clinical recommendations, especially if they have severe motor disability or cognitive problems.

=== Gait training ===
Patients with Parkinson's disease have an altered gait. There is a reduced gait speed and step length, increased axial rigidity, and impaired rhythmicity. These gait problems worsen as the disease continues. This is a major disease burden that markedly affects independence and quality of life. Since it is proven that tremor-dominant and akinetic rigid types of Parkinson's disease have various different visuomotor deficiencies, like problems in visual perception and motor coordination, that can influence their gait training, it is recommended for them to receive neuropsychological assessment before physical therapy.

Task-specific gait training may also lead to long-term gait improvement for patients with Parkinson's disease. Previous research studies have utilized body weight support systems during gait training, where individuals are suspended from an overhead harness with straps around the pelvic girdle as they walk on a treadmill. This form of gait training has been shown to improve long-term walking speed and a shuffling gait following a one-month intervention period.

Studies are also looking at the effect of tai chi on gait performance, and balance in people with Parkinson's Disease. The first study concluded that tai chi was ineffective since there was no improvement on gait performance and no improvement on the Part III score of the Unified Parkinson's Disease Rating Scale (UPDRS). The second study found that patients taking tai chi improved on their UPDRS score, Timed Up and Go test, six-minute walk and backwards walking. It did not however, show any improvements on their forward walking or their one leg stance test.

=== Speech and occupational therapy ===
One of the most widely practiced treatments for speech disorders associated with Parkinson's disease is the Lee Silverman voice treatment (LSVT). Speech therapy and specifically LSVT may improve speech.

People with Parkinson's disease can develop dysarthria which is characterized by reduced speech intelligibility. Prosodically based treatments may help.

Occupational therapy aims to promote health and quality of life by helping people with the disease to participate in as much of their daily routine as possible. There is indication that occupational therapy may improve motor skills and quality of life for the duration of the therapy.

=== Rhythmic auditory stimulation ===
Rhythmic auditory stimulation (RAS) is a neurological rehabilitation technique consisting in compensating the loss of motor regulation through an external sensory stimulation, mediated by the sound. This technique relies on the strong interaction between auditory and motor neural system. By synchronizing his footsteps on the emitted sound (that can be "metronome-like" cues or complex music) the patient can improves his gait speed and his stride length.

=== Telemedicine ===
A 2017 one-year randomized controlled trial found that providing remote neurologic care to individuals with Parkinson's Disease in their own homes was feasible and as effective as in-person care. While it can be more difficult for remote caregivers to establish trust while providing remote care, that assessment of video visits in a patient's home found that, after four virtual visits over one year, individuals with Parkinson's Disease preferred their connection with the remote specialist to their local clinician.

Benefits of telemedicine include convenience and cost-effectiveness, as the virtual in-home visits have been found to reduce travel costs and time for patients relative to in-office visits. Some studies have found that the technology supports personalized connections similar to the house calls of the past. Five randomized controlled trials indicated that quality of life was similar or improved for those receiving telemedicine care.

Challenges related to telemedicine in treatment of individuals with Parkinson's Disease are related to the technological requirements, as patients and their friends or families must have access to and familiarity with Internet-based technologies. In part because of these technological requirements, studies in the United States have tended to include few participants from ethnic minorities and disproportionately include more highly educated populations. One solution proposed to reduce social and economic barriers to access to remote care is to establish satellite teleneurology clinics in underserved regions. Physicians cite barriers with inability to perform a full neurologic exam in addition to technology and reimbursement issues.

New telemedicine technologies being used or evaluated in the context of telemedicine include proprietary wearables, self-sensing and adjusting closed loop systems, robotic technologies, smart devices to detect movements, programs to improve medication adherence, smart home integration, and artificial intelligence or machine learning-based systems.

== Palliative care ==
Palliative care is often required in the final stages of the disease, often when dopaminergic treatments have become ineffective. The aim of palliative care is to achieve the maximum quality of life for the person with the disease and those surrounding him or her. Some central issues of palliative are caring for patients at home while adequate care can be given there, reducing or withdrawing dopaminergic drug intake to reduce drug side effects and complications, preventing pressure ulcers by management of pressure areas of inactive patients, and facilitating the patient's end-of-life decisions for the patient, as well as involved friends and relatives.

== Other treatments ==
Repetitive transcranial magnetic stimulation temporarily improves levodopa-induced dyskinesias. Its full usefulness in PD is an open research field. Different nutrients have been proposed as possible treatments; however, no evidence shows vitamins or food additives improve symptoms. Not enough evidence exists to suggest that acupuncture, and practice of qigong or tai chi have any effect on symptoms. Fava and velvet beans are natural sources of L-DOPA and are taken by many people with PD. While they have shown some effectiveness, their intake is not free of risks. Life-threatening adverse reactions have been described, such as the neuroleptic malignant syndrome. Faecal transplants may have a beneficial impact on symptoms.

== History ==
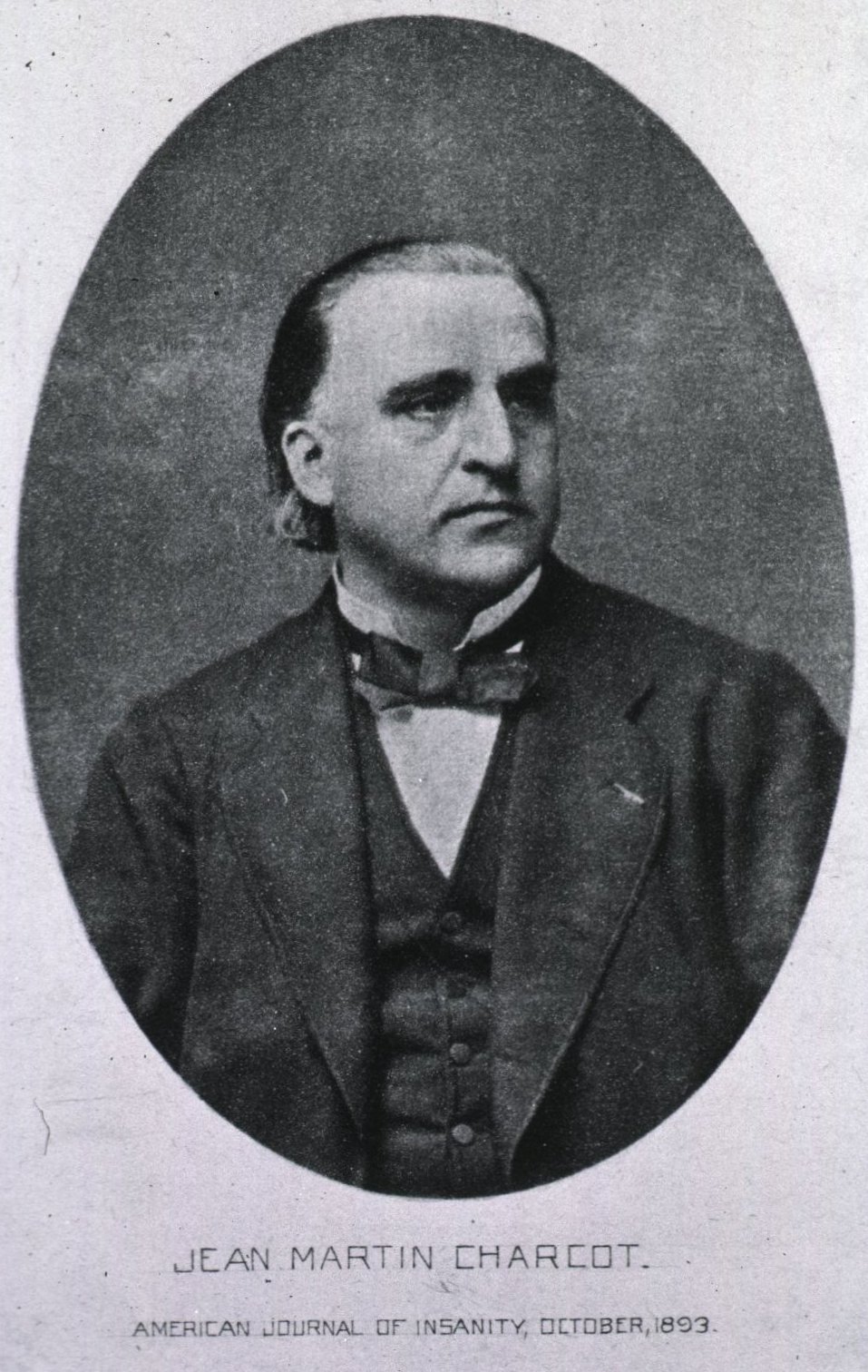
An 1893 photograph of Jean-Martin Charcot, who made important contributions to the understanding of the disease, including the proposal of anticholinergics as treatments for tremor

The positive albeit modest effects of anticholinergic alkaloids obtained from the plant of the belladonna were described during the 19th century by Charcot, Erb, and others. Modern surgery for tremor, consisting of the lesioning of some of the basal ganglia structures was first tried in 1939, and was improved over the following 20 years. Before this date, surgery consisted in lesioning the corticospinal pathway with paralysis instead of tremor as result. Anticholinergics and surgery were the only treatments until the arrival of levodopa, which reduced their use dramatically.

Levodopa was first synthesized in 1911 by Casimir Funk, but it received little attention until the mid-20th century. It entered clinical practice in 1967, and the first large study reporting improvements in people with Parkinson's disease resulting from treatment with levodopa was published in 1968. Levodopa brought about a revolution in the management of PD. By the late 1980s deep brain stimulation emerged as a possible treatment, and it was approved for clinical use by the FDA in 1997.

== Research directions ==
No new PD treatments are expected in the short term, but several lines of research are active for new treatments. Such research directions include the search of new animal models of the disease, and the potential usefulness of gene therapy, stem cells transplants, and neuroprotective agents.

=== Animal models ===
The tragedy of a group of drug addicts in California in the early 1980s who consumed a contaminated and illicitly produced batch of the synthetic opiate MPPP brought to light MPTP as a cause of parkinsonian symptoms. Other predominant toxin-based models employ the insecticide rotenone, the herbicide paraquat, and the fungicide maneb. Models based on toxins are most commonly used in primates. Transgenic rodent models also exist.

=== Gene therapy ===
Present treatments of Parkinson's disease provide satisfactory disease control for most early-stage patients. However, present gold-standard treatment of PD using levodopa is associated with motor complications, and does not prevent disease progression. More effective and long-term treatment of PD are urgently needed to control its progression. In vivo gene therapy is a new approach for treatment of PD. The use of somatic-cell gene transfer to alter gene expression in brain neurochemical systems is a novel alternative conventional treatment.

Gene therapy is currently under investigation. It involves the use of a noninfectious virus to shuttle a gene into a part of the brain. The gene used leads to the production of an enzyme which helps to manage PD symptoms or protects the brain from further damage.

One of the gene therapy based approach involves gene delivery of neurturin and glial cell line-derived neurotrophic factor (GDNF) to the putamen in patients with advanced Parkinson's disease. GDNF protects dopamine neurons in vitro and animal models of parkinsonism; neurturin is a structural and functional analogue of GDNF that protected dopamine neuron in animal model of the disease. Despite open-label trials showing benefits of continuous infusion of GDNF, the results were not confirmed in double-blind studies. This may be due to the distribution factor; the trophic factor was not distributed sufficiently throughout the target place.

Another gene therapy of PD involved insertion of the glutamic acid decarboxylase (GAD) into the subthalamic nucleus. GAD enzyme controls GABA productions. In Parkinson's disease, the activity of both GABA efferents to the subthalamic nucleus and its target within the basal ganglia circuitry are affected. This strategy used adeno-associated viral vector (AAV2) to deliver GAD to the subthalamic nucleus. The trial was done to compare the effect of bilateral delivery of AAV2-GAD into the subthalamic nucleus with bilateral sham surgery in patients with advanced Parkinson's disease. The study showed the first success of randomised, double-blind gene therapy trial for a neurodegenerative disease and justified the continued development of AAV2-GAD for treatment of PD.

=== Neuroprotective treatments ===
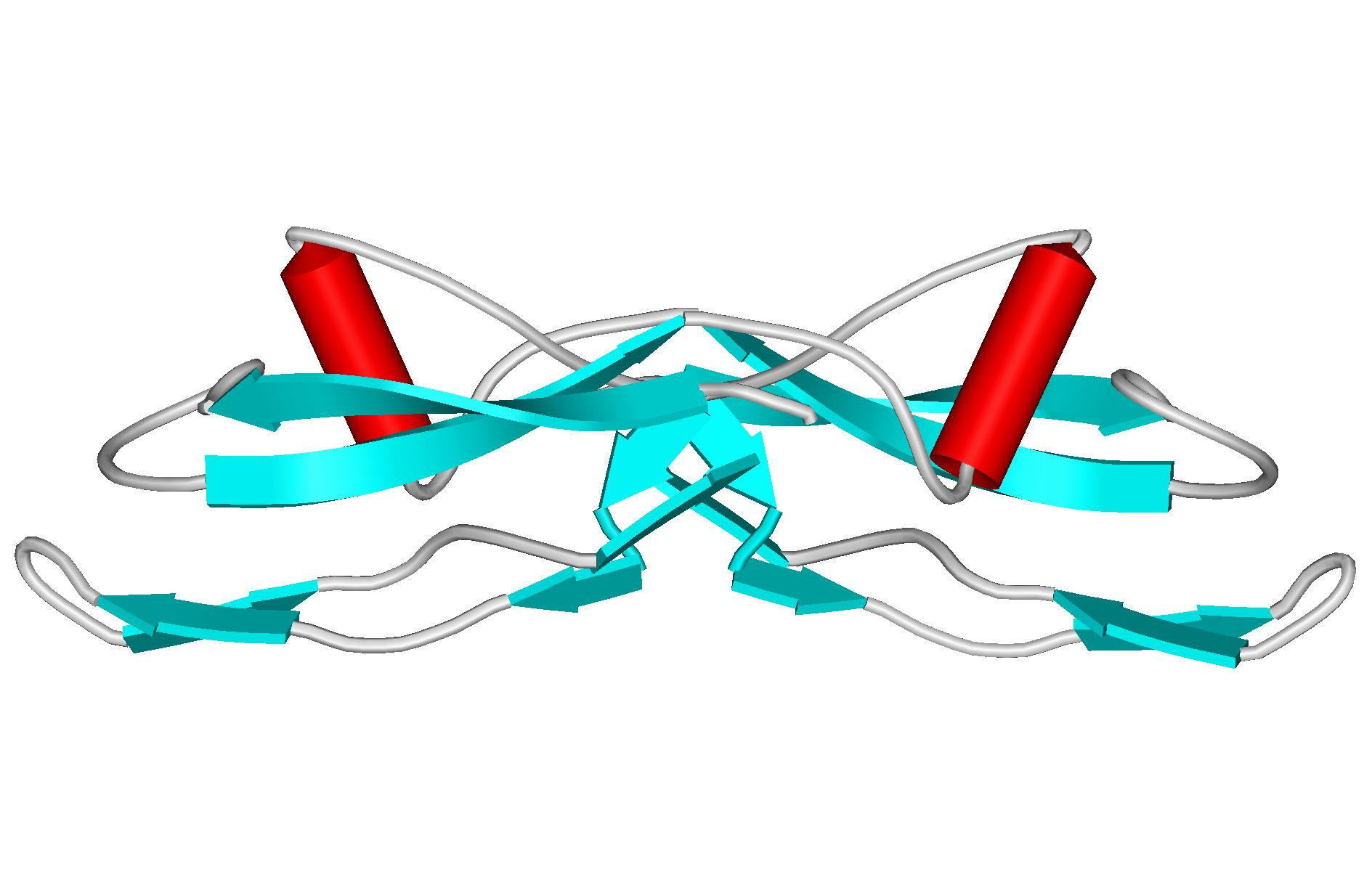
While several chemical compounds such as GNDF (chemical structure pictured) have been proposed as neuroprotectors in PD, none has proven its efficacy.

Investigations on neuroprotection are at the forefront of PD research. Currently, no proven neuroprotective agents or treatments are available for PD. While still theoretical, neuroprotective therapy is based on the idea that certain neurons that produce dopamine and are susceptible to premature degeneration and cell death can be protected by the introduction of neuroprotective pharmaceuticals. This protection can occur before any symptoms manifest based on genetic risk, and also during early- or late-stage PD when other treatments have ceased their impact due to the progression of the disease. Accordingly, neuroprotective therapy seeks to delay the introduction of levodopa.

Several molecules have been proposed as potential treatments. However, none of them has been conclusively demonstrated to reduce degeneration. Agents currently under investigation include antiapoptotics (omigapil, CEP-1347), antiglutamatergics, monoamine oxidase inhibitors (selegiline, rasagiline), promitochondrials (coenzyme Q10, creatine), calcium channel blockers (isradipine) and growth factors (GDNF). Preclinical research also targets alpha-synuclein.

==== Selegiline ====
Selegiline is in a group of medications called monoamine oxidase type B (MAO-B) inhibitors. Selegiline is used to help control the symptoms of Parkinson's disease in people who are taking levodopa and carbidopa combination (Sinemet). Selegiline may help people with PD by stopping the effects of levodopa/carbidopa from wearing off, and increasing the length of time levodopa/carbidopa continues to control symptoms.

==== Rasagiline ====
In response to potentially toxic amphetamine metabolites caused by selegiline, another promising treatment is in MAO B propargyl amine inhibitor rasagiline (N-propargyl-1-R-aminoindan, Azilect((R))). The oral bioavailability of rasagiline is 35%, it reaches T_{(max)} after 0.5–1.0 hours and its half-life is 1.5–3.5 hours. Rasagiline undergoes extensive hepatic metabolism primarily by cytochrome P450 type 1A2 (CYP1A2). Rasagiline is initiated at 1-mg once-daily dose as monotherapy in early PD patients and at 0.5–1.0 mg once-daily as adjunctive to levodopa in advanced PD patients.

=== Neural transplantation ===
Since early in the 1980s fetal, porcine, carotid or retinal tissues have been used in cell transplants for PD patients. Although there was initial evidence of mesencephalic dopamine-producing cell transplants being beneficial, the best constructed studies up to date indicate that cell transplants have no effect. An additional significant problem was the excess release of dopamine by the transplanted tissue, leading to dystonias. However, several defining features of Parkinson's disease (e.g., postural instability, bradykinesia, and resting tremors) are attributable to the degeneration of midbrain dopaminergic neurons. This degeneration disrupts neurotransmitter balance, enhances inhibitory signaling within the motor pathways, and ultimately contributes to impaired motor function. To help manage this condition, stem cell transplants has emerged as a main research recent target: they are easy to manipulate and when transplanted into the brains of rodents and monkeys, cells survive and improve behavioral abnormalities of the animals.. Using an animal model of Parkinson's disease, one study examined the replacement of lost midbrain dopamine neurons by transplanting induced pluripotent stem (iPSC) derived neurons into rats with parkinsonian symptoms. After transplantation, these transplanted cells had the capacity to survive, grow neural projections, and develop into functioning dopamine producing neurons over the course of several weeks. Correspondingly, the rats who were treated in the study showed improvements in behavioral outcomes, including a reduction in abnormal motor movements. In another study, the transplantation of Mouse iPSC-derived GABAergic progenitors was also shown to improve motor function and restored GABAergic signaling, which is crucial for the regulation of motor control. Despite these findings, the use of fetal stem cells is controversial. Some have proposed that such controversy may be overcome with the use of induced pluripotent stem cells from adults.
