= Quinalizarin =

- Skeletal formula of quinalizarin

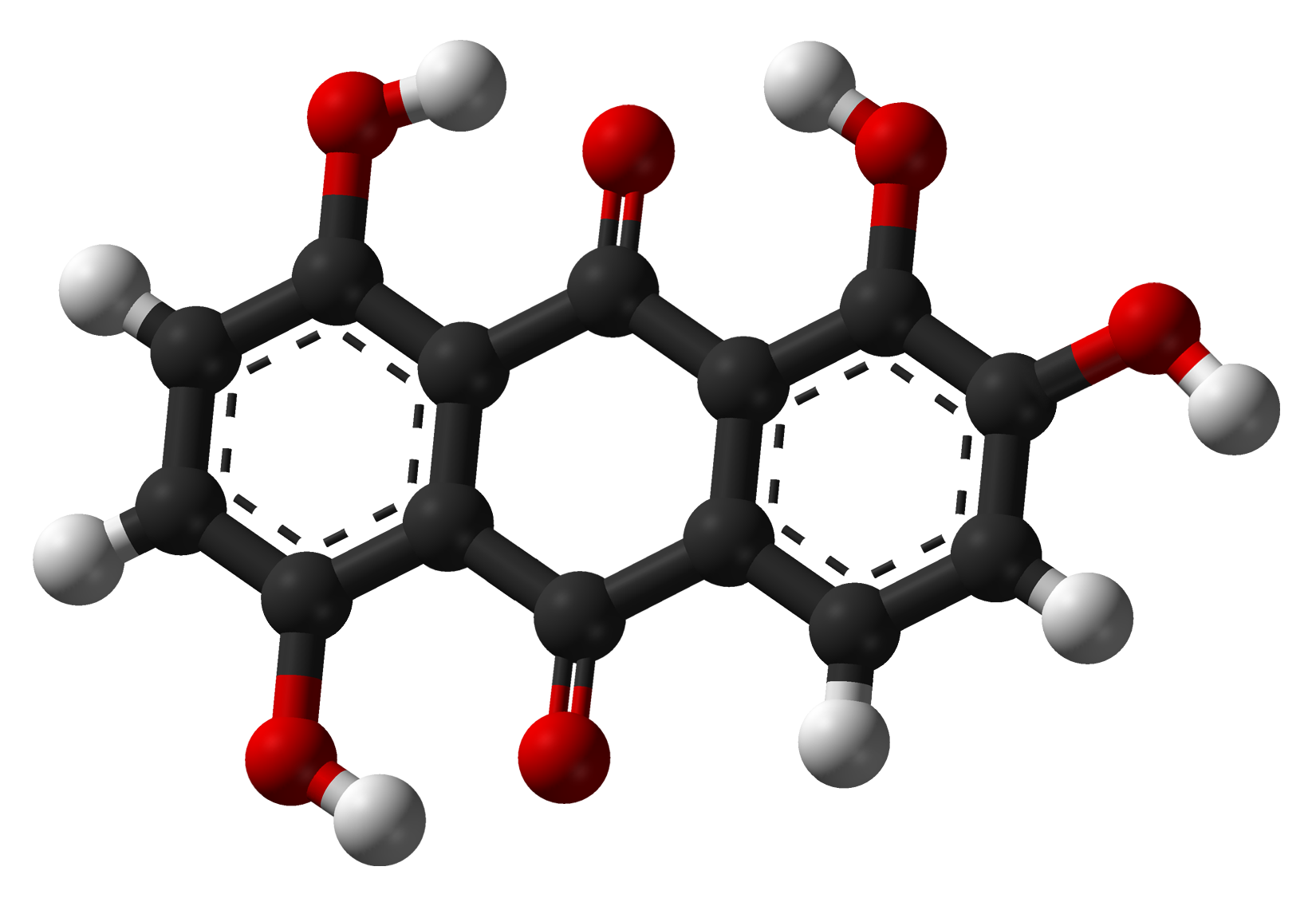
- Ball-and-stick model

Names
- Preferred IUPAC name 1,2,5,8-Tetrahydroxyanthracene-9,10-dione

Identifiers
CAS Number	81-61-8
3D model (JSmol)	Interactive image
ChEMBL	ChEMBL29898
ChemSpider	4829
ECHA InfoCard	100.001.243
PubChem CID	5004
UNII	6D43C3LYSG
CompTox Dashboard (EPA)	DTXSID4052558
- InChI: InChI=1S/C14H8O6/c15-6-3-4-7(16)11-10(6)12(18)5-1-2-8(17)13(19)9(5)14(11)20/h1-4,15-17,19H Key: VBHKTXLEJZIDJF-UHFFFAOYSA-N; InChI=1/C14H8O6/c15-6-3-4-7(16)11-10(6)12(18)5-1-2-8(17)13(19)9(5)14(11)20/h1-4,15-17,19H Key: VBHKTXLEJZIDJF-UHFFFAOYAM
- SMILES: C1=CC(=C(C2=C1C(=O)C3=C(C=CC(=C3C2=O)O)O)O)O

Properties
Chemical formula	C_{14}H_{8}O_{6}
Molar mass	272.212 g·mol^{−1}
- Except where otherwise noted, data are given for materials in their standard state (at 25 °C [77 °F], 100 kPa). verify (what is ?) Infobox references

Quinalizarin or 1,2,5,8-tetrahydroxyanthraquinone is an organic compound with formula C_{12}H_{4}(OH)_{4}(CO)_{2}. It is one of many tetrahydroxyanthraquinone isomers, formally derived from anthraquinone by replacement of four hydrogen atoms by hydroxyl (OH) groups at the 1, 2, 5, and 8 positions.

Quinalizarin is an inhibitor of the enzyme protein kinase CK2. It is more potent and selective than emodin. It is also a potent catechol O-methyltransferase (COMT) inhibitor.

== See also ==
- 1,4-Dihydroxyanthraquinone (quinizarin)
- Alizarin, a related simpler dye
