= Rs4680 =

Genetic variant

SNP: rs4680
- Name(s): Val158Met, Val108/158Met, G1947A
- Gene: COMT
- Chromosome: 22
- Region: Exon 3

External databases
- Ensembl: Human SNPView
- dbSNP: 4680
- HapMap: 4680
- SNPedia: 4680
- AlzGene: Meta-analysis; Overview
- SzGene: Meta-analysis; Overview

In genetics, rs4680 (Val158Met) is a genetic variant. It is a single nucleotide polymorphism (SNP) in the COMT gene that codes catechol-O-Methyltransferase. The single nucleotide substitution between G→A results in an amino acid change from valine to methionine at codon 158.

The A or Met allele is associated with lower enzymatic activity (due to thermoinstability), and with exploratory behaviour.

The polymorphism has been much studied in schizophrenia research but as of November 2011 meta-analysis in the SzGene database shows no or very little effect.

Several personality genetics studies have examined the association of the polymorphism with personality traits including extroversion, risk aversion, and novelty seeking.
