= Tetrahydroxyanthraquinone =

A tetrahydroxyanthraquinone, also called tetrahydroxyanthradione, is any of several isomeric organic compounds with formula (C_{12}H_{4}(OH)_{4})(CO)_{2}, almost invariably derived from 9,10-anthraquinone by replacing four hydrogen atoms by hydroxyl groups. Only a few of these isomers are commercially significant. These are 1,2,5,8-tetrahydroxyanthraquinone (quinalizarin), 1,4,5,8-tetrahydroxyanthraquinone, and 1,2,3,4-tetrahydroxyanthraquinone (Alizarine Bordeaux).

== See also ==
- Hydroxyanthraquinone
- Tetrahydroxybenzoquinone
- Tetrahydroxynaphthoquinone

== See also ==
- Wahl, Andre; Atack, F. W (1919) The Manufacture Of Organic Dyestuffs. G. Bell And Sons, Limited. Online version accessed on 2010-01-22.
