= Catechol-O-methyltransferase inhibitor =

Medication

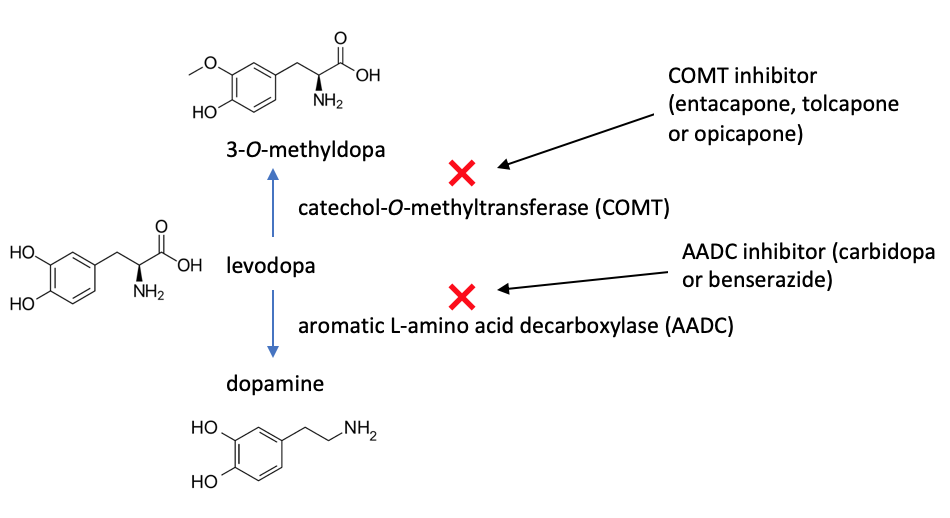
Metabolism of levodopa by catechol-O-methyltransferase (COMT) and aromatic L-amino acid decarboxylase (AADC). COMT inhibitors prevent the conversion of levodopa to 3-O-methyldopa.

A catechol-O-methyltransferase inhibitor (COMT inhibitor) is a drug that inhibits the enzyme catechol-O-methyltransferase. This enzyme methylates catecholamines such as dopamine, norepinephrine and epinephrine. It also methylates levodopa. COMT inhibitors are indicated for the treatment of Parkinson's disease in combination with levodopa and an aromatic L-amino acid decarboxylase inhibitor (e.g. carbidopa or benserazide). The therapeutic benefit of using a COMT inhibitor is based on its ability to prevent the methylation of levodopa to 3-O-methyldopa, thus increasing the bioavailability of levodopa. COMT inhibitors significantly decrease off time in people with Parkinson's disease also taking carbidopa/levodopa.

== List of COMT inhibitors ==
- Marketed
  - Entacapone (Comtan, Comtess, Stalevo)
  - Opicapone (Ongentys)
  - Tolcapone (Tasmar)
- Not marketed
  - Nebicapone (BIA 3-202)
  - Neluxicapone
  - Nitecapone (OR-462)

Entacapone and opicapone are peripherally selective inhibitors, unable to cross the blood–brain barrier (BBB), and hence do not inhibit COMT in the brain. Tolcapone also appears to be peripherally selective. However, it has been found to cross the BBB to at least some degree and significantly inhibit COMT in the brain as well. However, the clinical relevance of its COMT inhibition in the brain in Parkinson's disease is uncertain. Instead, the drug seems to exert most of its clinical efficacy in this condition through inhibition of peripheral COMT and is dependent on concomitant use of levodopa.

Tolcapone has been associated with at least three fatal cases of acute liver failure and is thus only rarely prescribed. Patients taking tolcapone must be monitored for hepatic failure. Entacapone and opicapone have not been associated with hepatotoxicity.

== Adverse effects ==
- nausea
- orthostatic hypotension
- vivid dreams
- confusion
- hallucinations
- hepatotoxicity (only tolcapone)
- diarrhea
- drowsiness
- urine discoloration
- dyskinesia

== Research ==
Centrally acting COMT inhibitors like CERC-406 and CERC-425 that inhibit COMT in the brain in addition to the periphery were under investigation for potential treatment of residual cognitive impairment symptoms in Parkinson's disease and of depressive disorders. However, while preclinical research was conducted, development was discontinued. Tolcapone, which acts centrally in addition to peripherally, has shown antidepressant-like effects in animal models of depression. However, these antidepressant-like effects may only occur with combination treatment of tolcapone with levodopa and an aromatic L-amino acid decarboxylase inhibitor. In animals, tolcapone by itself does not increase dopamine levels in the striatum, nucleus accumbens, or frontal cortex, but does augment brain L-DOPA levels when combined with levodopa and benserazide. There may be compensatory activation of the monoamine oxidase dopamine-metabolizing pathway with brain COMT inhibition.

== See also ==
- Medication Management of Parkinson's disease
- catechol-O-methyltransferase
- entacapone
- carbidopa/levodopa/entacapone
- tolcapone
- opicapone
- nitecapone
