= Nitecapone =

Chemical compound

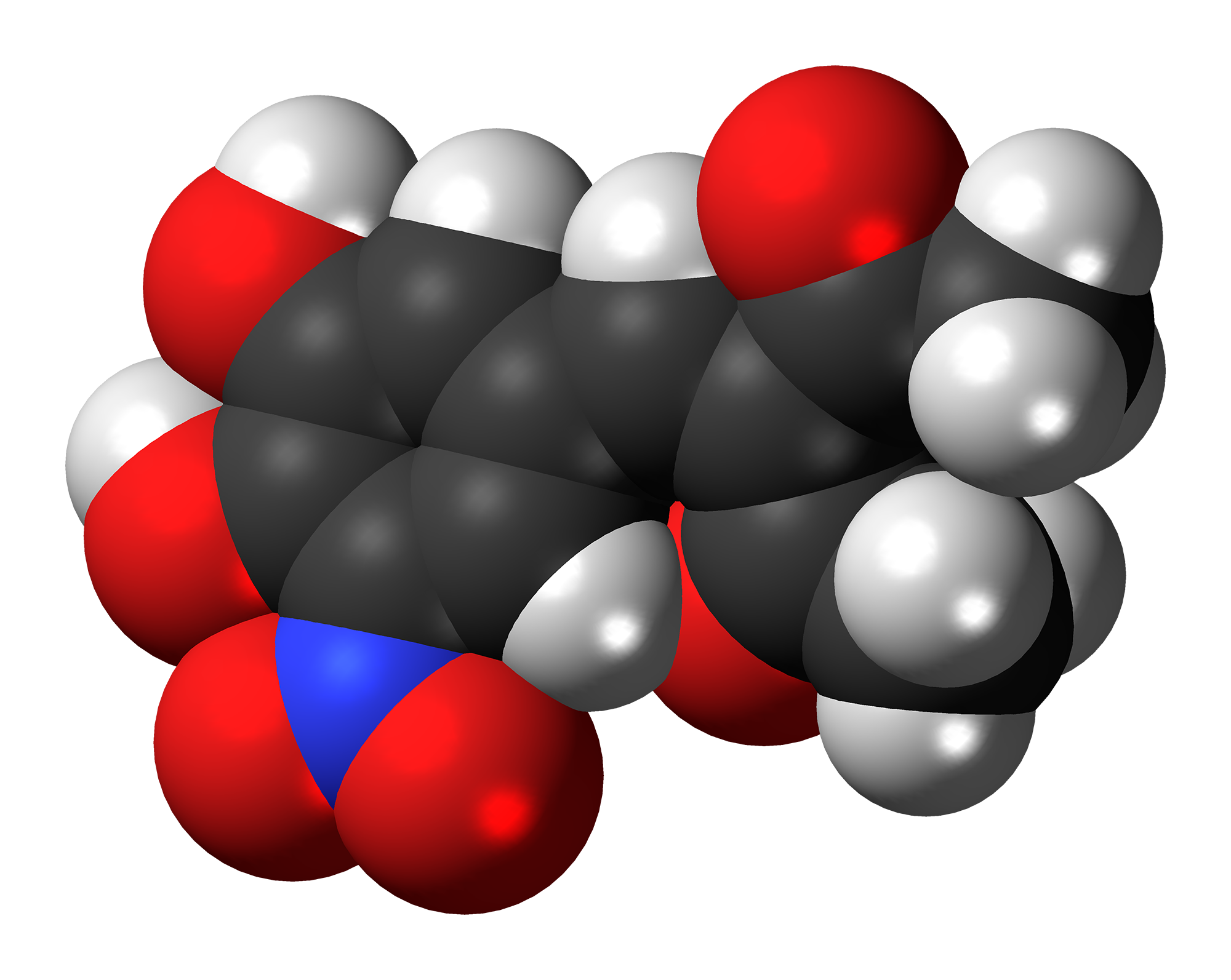

Clinical data
- ATC code: None

Identifiers
- IUPAC name: 3-[(3,4-Dihydroxy-5-nitrophenyl)methylidene]pentane-2,4-dione
- CAS Number: 116313-94-1
- PubChem CID: 5464105
- ChemSpider: 4576539
- UNII: 98BS722498
- KEGG: D03241
- ChEMBL: ChEMBL167055
- CompTox Dashboard (EPA): DTXSID80151347

Chemical and physical data
- Formula: C_{12}H_{11}NO_{6}
- Molar mass: 265.221 g·mol^{−1}
- 3D model (JSmol): Interactive image
- SMILES: [O-][N+](=O)c1cc(\C=C(/C(=O)C)C(=O)C)cc(O)c1O
- InChI: InChI=1S/C12H11NO6/c1-6(14)9(7(2)15)3-8-4-10(13(18)19)12(17)11(16)5-8/h3-5,16-17H,1-2H3; Key:UPMRZALMHVUCIN-UHFFFAOYSA-N

Nitecapone (INN; OR-462) is a drug which acts as a selective inhibitor of the enzyme catechol O-methyl transferase (COMT). It was patented as an antiparkinson medication but was never marketed.

== See also ==
- List of investigational Parkinson's disease drugs
- Catechol-O-methyltransferase inhibitor
