= Ether cleavage =

Chemical reaction

Ether cleavage refers to chemical substitution reactions that lead to the cleavage of ethers. Due to the high chemical stability of ethers, the cleavage of the C-O bond is uncommon in the absence of specialized reagents or under extreme conditions.

In organic chemistry, ether cleavage is an acid catalyzed nucleophilic substitution reaction. Depending on the specific ether, cleavage can follow either S_{N}1 or S_{N}2 mechanisms. Distinguishing between both mechanisms requires consideration of inductive and mesomeric effects that could stabilize or destabilize a potential carbocation in the S_{N}1 pathway. Usage of hydrohalic acids takes advantage of the fact that these agents are able to protonate the ether oxygen atom and also provide a halide anion as a suitable nucleophile. However, as ethers show similar basicity as alcohols (pK_{a} of approximately 16), the equilibrium of protonation lies on the side of the unprotonated ether and cleavage is usually very slow at room temperature.

Ethers can be cleaved by strongly basic agents, e.g. organolithium compounds. Cyclic ethers are especially susceptible to base cleavage, but acyclic ethers can be cleaved as well.

== Mechanism in acid ==
Ethers cleave in polar, acidic solutions. Provided that a carbocation intermediate can be adequately stabilized, the cleavage occurs via the unimolecular S_{N}1 mechanism. Otherwise (methyl, vinyl, aryl or primary carbocations), it follows a bimolecular, concerted S_{N}2 mechanism.

The hydrohalic acid plays an important role in the reaction, as the rate of reaction increases down the period. The cause is both higher acidity and the higher nucleophilicity of the respective conjugate base. Fluoride is not nucleophilic enough to cleave ethers in protic media, hydrochloric acid only reacts under rigorous conditions, and hydrobromic acid cleaves slower than hydroiodic acid.

Regardless of which hydrohalic acid is used, the reaction is slow and requires heat.

=== S_{N}1 example ===

In the example, the oxygen atom in methyl tert-butyl ether is reversibly protonated. The resulting oxonium ion then decomposes into methanol and a relatively stable tert-butyl cation. The latter is attacked by a halide nucleophile (here bromide), yielding tert-butyl bromide.

=== S_{N}2 example ===

In the example, the ether oxygen is reversibly protonated. The halide ion (here bromide) then nucleophilically attacks the sterically less hindered carbon atom, thereby forming methyl bromide and 1-propanol.

== With organometallic bases ==
=== Mechanism ===
Basic ether cleavage begins with deprotonation at the α position. The ether then decomposes into an alkene and an alkoxide. Cyclic ethers allow for an especially quick concerted cleavage, as seen for THF:

Deprotonated, acyclic ethers eliminate hydride at the β position, forming an olefinic ether. The resulting hydride then attacks the olefin at a position α to the ether oxygen, releasing the alkoxide.

=== Impact ===
Organometallic agents are often handled in ethereal solvents, which coordinate to the metallic centers and enhance the reactivity of the organic groups. Here, the ether cleavage poses a problem, as it decomposes the solvent and consumes the organometallic agent. Reactions with organometallic agents are therefore typically performed at low temperatures (-78 °C). At these temperatures, deprotonation occurs more slowly than the intended reactions.

== Literature ==
- Paula Y. Bruice: Organic Chemistry, Prentice Hall. ISBN 978-0321697684.
