= Lee Silverman voice treatment =

Treatment for speech disorders

The Lee Silverman Voice Treatment – LOUD (LSVT LOUD) is a treatment for speech disorders associated with Parkinson's disease (PD). It focuses on increasing vocal loudness and is delivered by a speech therapist in sixteen one-hour sessions spread over four weeks. A derivative of this treatment, known as LSVT BIG, is used in treating movement aspects of Parkinson's disease.

== Background ==
Dr. Lorraine Ramig started Parkinson's Disease rehabilitation research in 1983 while serving as assistant professor on tenure track in the Department of Speech, Language and Hearing Science at the University of Colorado-Boulder. Dr. Ramig was approached by colleague Dr. Wilbur Gould who requested her assistance in treating a friend, Mrs. Lee Silverman. The Voice Treatment consisted of four weeks of rigorous therapy, entailing four one-hour sessions per week, with the goal of increasing patient's voice and speech abilities. Dr. Ramig officially founded the Lee Silverman Voice Treatment program LSVT Global in 1985 in honor of the first patient who died before research was officially published and recognized as a medical discovery.

The foundation defines the processes of LSVT LOUD treatment with specific clinical exercises in speech therapy. The initial design of the project included "medical care, physical therapy, occupational therapy, speech therapy, family support, nutrition and recreation," according to Dr. Ramig, but Silverman's family challenged Ramig to create a design based only on speech so they could communicate with her better.

== Process of treatment ==
The treatment is delivered during hour-long sessions with a speech-language pathologist, given four times a week for four weeks. These sessions stress the idea of "thinking loud in order to speak loud" and use exaggerated motions and behaviors. Through video documentation, the patient's loudness is measured through a series of voice exercises using a decibel sound meter. In the two videos cited, both patients were asked to take a breath and say "Ahh" as long as they can. Targeting the vocal chords is a way of expanding the patient's capability of speaking more fluently despite the conditions of Parkinson's. In one video, the patient says "Ahh" in many scales (ascending and descaling), then goes on to functional phrases, and finally phrases that answer questions such as "I'm fine".

== LSVT – BIG ==
A derivative of this treatment, known as LSVT BIG, is used by speech-language pathologists, physiotherapists, and occupational therapists to promote high-amplitude movements in people with Parkinson's disease. The quick, explosive movements characteristic of LSVT BIG are aimed at reversing one of four cardinal movement symptoms in PD, bradykinesia. The Berlin Big Study compared the effectiveness of three distinct exercise programs in people with mild to moderate Parkinson's disease. Subjects were randomly assigned to receive either one-on-one LSVT BIG training, group Nordic walking training, or domestic unsupervised exercises. At the conclusion of the training period, the LSVT BIG group demonstrated a significant improvement in Unified Parkinson's Disease Rating Scale (UPDRS) motor score and 10-m timed up and go test timing compared with the Nordic walking and home exercise group.
