= Catechol-O-methyltransferase =

Class of enzymes

COMT
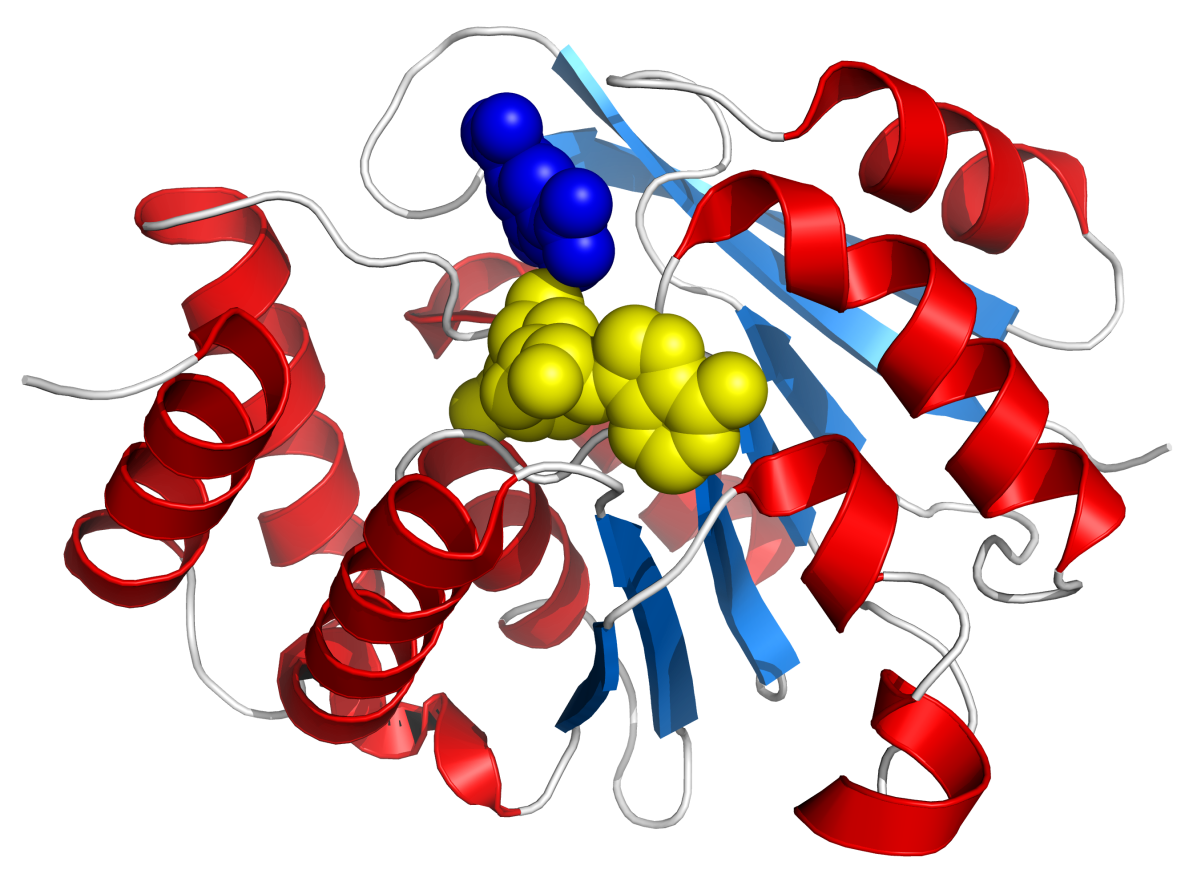

Identifiers
- Aliases: COMT, HEL-S-98n, catechol-O-methyltransferase
- External IDs: OMIM: 116790; MGI: 88470; GeneCards: COMT
Available structures
PDB	Ortholog search: PDBe RCSB
PDB	List of PDB id codes 4XUE, 3A7E, 3BWM, 3BWY, 4PYI, 4PYJ, 4PYK, 4XUC, 4XUD
Enzyme activity
EC #	BRENDA	ExPASy	KEGG	MetaCyc
2.1.1.6	↗	↗	↗	↗

Gene location (Human)
Chr.	Chromosome 22 (human)
Band	22q11.21	Start	19,941,371 bp
Band	22q11.21	End	19,969,975 bp

Gene location (Mouse)
Chr.	Chromosome 16 (mouse)
Band	16 A3|16 11.4 cM	Start	18,225,636 bp
Band	16 A3|16 11.4 cM	End	18,245,602 bp
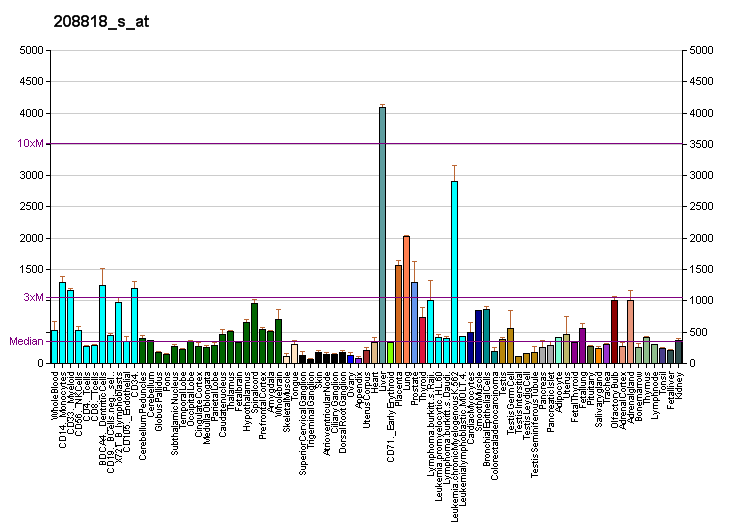

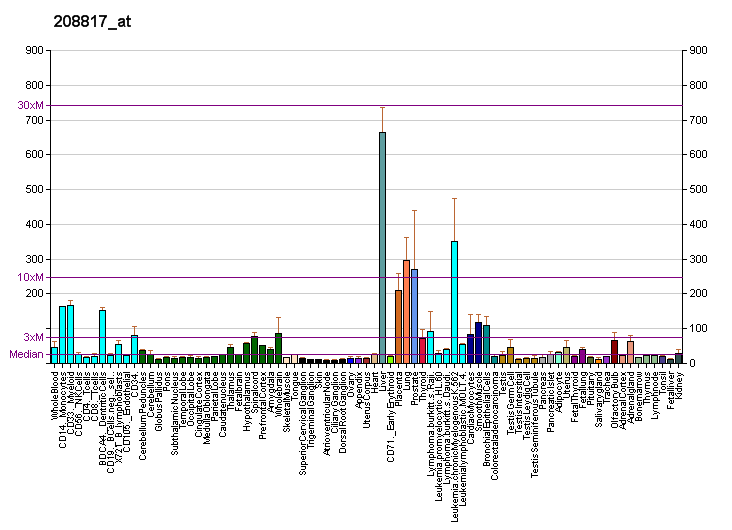

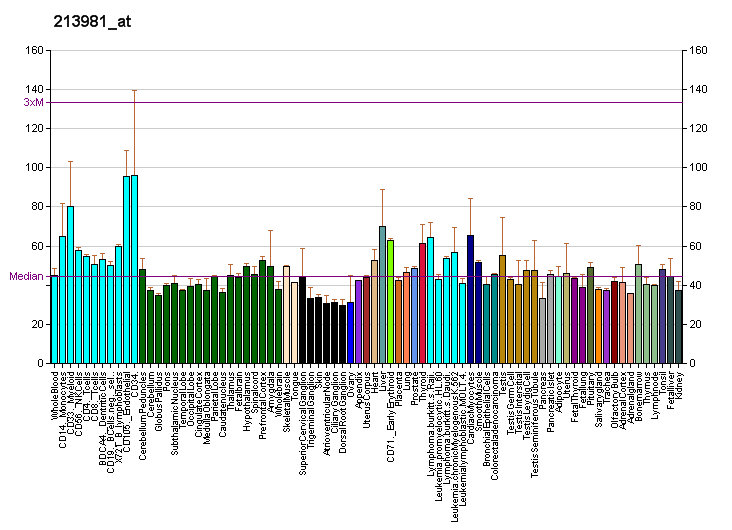
RNA expression pattern
Bgee	Human / Mouse (ortholog); Top expressed in: right adrenal cortex; stromal cell of endometrium; left adrenal gland; olfactory bulb; left adrenal cortex; C1 segment; mucosa of pharynx; right lobe of liver; corpus callosum; mucosa of esophagus / Top expressed in: white adipose tissue; right kidney; proximal tubule; liver; human kidney; adrenal gland; urinary bladder; heart; striatum of neuraxis; duodenum; More reference expression data
BioGPS	More reference expression data
Gene ontology
Molecular function	transferase activity; O-methyltransferase activity; metal ion binding; protein binding; magnesium ion binding; catechol O-methyltransferase activity; methyltransferase activity; L-dopa O-methyltransferase activity; orcinol O-methyltransferase activity
Cellular component	cytoplasm; integral component of membrane; cell body; cytosol; postsynaptic membrane; membrane; plasma membrane; dendritic spine; axon; dendrite; mitochondrion; extracellular exosome; intracellular membrane-bounded organelle
Biological process	multicellular organismal reproductive process; negative regulation of smooth muscle cell proliferation; response to organic cyclic compound; regulation of sensory perception of pain; estrogen metabolic process; cellular response to phosphate starvation; catechol-containing compound metabolic process; female pregnancy; negative regulation of dopamine metabolic process; developmental process; learning; catecholamine metabolic process; neurotransmitter catabolic process; response to lipopolysaccharide; methylation; dopamine metabolic process; response to pain; short-term memory; negative regulation of renal sodium excretion; dopamine catabolic process; positive regulation of homocysteine metabolic process; catecholamine catabolic process; response to estrogen
Sources:Amigo / QuickGO
Orthologs
Databases	NCBI: entry; OMA: entry
Species	Human	Mouse
Entrez	1312	12846
Ensembl	ENSG00000093010	ENSMUSG00000000326
UniProt	P21964	O88587
RefSeq (mRNA)	NM_000754; NM_001135161; NM_001135162; NM_007310; NM_001362828	NM_001111062; NM_001111063; NM_007744
RefSeq (protein)	NP_000745; NP_001128633; NP_001128634; NP_009294; NP_001349757	NP_001104532; NP_001104533; NP_031770
Location (UCSC)	Chr 22: 19.94 – 19.97 Mb	Chr 16: 18.23 – 18.25 Mb
PubMed search
- Wikidata
View/Edit Human	View/Edit Mouse

catechol-O-methyltransferase

Identifiers
- EC no.: 2.1.1.6
- CAS no.: 9012-25-3

Databases
- BRENDA: enzyme data
- ExPASy: NiceZyme view
- KEGG: enzyme entry
- MetaCyc: metabolic pathway
- Rhea: reactions
- PDB structures: RCSB PDB PDBe PDBsum
- Gene Ontology: AmiGO / QuickGO
Search
- PMC: articles
- PubMed: articles
- NCBI: proteins

Norepinephrine degradation. Catechol-O-methyltransferase is shown in green boxes.

Catechol-O-methyltransferase (COMT; EC 2.1.1.6) is one of several enzymes that degrade catecholamines (neurotransmitters such as dopamine, epinephrine, and norepinephrine), catechol estrogens, and various drugs and substances having a catechol structure. In humans, catechol-O-methyltransferase protein is encoded by the COMT gene. Two isoforms of COMT are produced: the soluble short form (S-COMT) and the membrane bound long form (MB-COMT). As the regulation of catecholamines is impaired in a number of medical conditions, several pharmaceutical drugs target COMT to alter its activity and therefore the availability of catecholamines. COMT was first discovered by the biochemist Julius Axelrod in 1957.

== Function ==
Catechol-O-methyltransferase is involved in the inactivation of the catecholamine neurotransmitters (dopamine, epinephrine, and norepinephrine). The enzyme introduces a methyl group to the catecholamine, which is donated by S-adenosyl methionine (SAM). Any compound having a catechol structure, like catecholestrogens and catechol-containing flavonoids, are substrates of COMT.

Specific reactions catalyzed by COMT include:

- L-DOPA (levodopa) → 3-O-methyldopa
- Dopamine → 3-methoxytyramine
- DOPAC → HVA (homovanillic acid)
- Norepinephrine → normetanephrine
- Epinephrine → metanephrine
- Dihydroxyphenylethylene glycol (DOPEG) → methoxyhydroxyphenylglycol (MOPEG)
- 3,4-Dihydroxymandelic acid (DOMA) → vanillylmandelic acid (VMA)

In the brain, COMT-dependent dopamine degradation is of particular importance in brain regions with low expression of the presynaptic dopamine transporter (DAT), such as the prefrontal cortex (In the PFC, dopamine is also removed by presynaptic norepinephrine transporters (NET) and degraded by monoamine oxidase.). Controversy exists about the predominance and orientation of membrane bound COMT in the CNS, that is, whether this COMT process is active intracellularly in postsynaptic neurons and glia, or oriented outward on the membrane, acting extracellularly on synaptic and extrasynaptic dopamine.

Soluble COMT can also be found extracellularly, although extracellular COMT plays a less significant role in the CNS than it does peripherally. Despite its importance in neurons, COMT is actually primarily expressed in the liver.

== Genetics in humans ==
The COMT protein is coded by the gene COMT. The gene is associated with allelic variants. The best-studied is Val^{158}Met. Others are rs737865 and rs165599 that have been studied, e.g., for association with personality traits, response to antidepressant medications, and psychosis risk associated with Alzheimer's disease. COMT has been studied as a potential gene in the pathogenesis of schizophrenia; however meta-analyses find no association between the risk of schizophrenia and a number of polymorphisms, including Val^{158}Met.

COMT variations are associated with variance in response to morphine. A haplotype with frequency of 34% is associated with lower required morphine doses and six SNPs are associated with differences in required doses: rs5746849, rs740603 (intron 1), rs6269 (intron 2), rs2239393 (intron 3), rs4818 and rs4680 (Val^{158}Met, exon 4).

=== Val^{158}Met polymorphism ===
A functional single-nucleotide polymorphism (a common normal variant) of the gene for catechol-O-methyltransferase results in a valine to methionine mutation at position 158 (Val^{158}Met) rs4680. In vitro, the homozygous Val variant metabolizes dopamine at up to four times the rate of its methionine counterpart. However, in vivo the Met variant is overexpressed in the brain, resulting in a 40% decrease (rather than 75% decrease) in functional enzyme activity. The lower rates of catabolism for the Met allele results in higher synaptic dopamine levels following neurotransmitter release, ultimately increasing dopaminergic stimulation of the postsynaptic neuron. Given the preferential role of COMT in prefrontal dopamine degradation, the Val^{158}Met polymorphism is thought to exert its effects on cognition by modulating dopamine signaling in the frontal lobes.

The gene variant has been shown to affect cognitive tasks broadly related to executive function, such as set shifting, response inhibition, abstract thought, and the acquisition of rules or task structure.

Comparable effects on similar cognitive tasks, the frontal lobes, and the neurotransmitter dopamine have also all been linked to schizophrenia. It has been proposed that an inherited variant of COMT is one of the genetic factors that may predispose someone to developing schizophrenia later in life. A more recent study cast doubt on the proposed connection between this gene and any alleged causal effect of cannabis on schizophrenia development.

A non-synonymous single-nucleotide polymorphism rs4680 was found to be associated with depressed factor of Positive and Negative Syndrome Scale(PANSS) and efficiency of emotion in schizophrenia subjects. It is increasingly recognised that allelic variation at the COMT gene are also relevant for emotional processing, as they seem to influence the interaction between prefrontal and limbic regions. Research conducted at the Section of Neurobiology of Psychosis, Institute of Psychiatry, King's College London has demonstrated an effect of COMT both in patients with bipolar disorder and in their relatives, but these findings have not been replicated so far.

The COMT Val^{158}Met polymorphism also has a pleiotropic effect on emotional processing. Furthermore, the polymorphism has been shown to affect ratings of subjective well-being. When 621 women were measured with experience sample monitoring, which is similar to mood assessment as response to beeping watch, the met/met form confers double the subjective mental sensation of well-being from a wide variety of daily events. The ability to experience reward increased with the number of Met alleles. Also, the effect of different genotype was greater for events that were felt as more pleasant. The effect size of genotypic moderation was quite large: Subjects with the Val/Val genotype generated almost similar amounts of subjective well-being from a 'very pleasant event' as Met/Met subjects did from a 'bit pleasant event'. Genetic variation with functional impact on cortical dopamine tone has a strong influence on reward experience in the flow of daily life. In one study participants with the met/met phenotype described an increase of positive affect twice as high in amplitude as participants with the Val/Val phenotype following very pleasant or pleasant events.

One review found that those with Val/Val tended to be more extroverted, more novelty-seeking, and less neurotic than those with the Met/Met allele

=== Temporomandibular joint dysfunction ===
Temporomandibular joint dysfunction (TMD) does not appear to be a classic genetic disorder, however variations in the gene that codes for COMT have been suggested to be responsible for inheritance of a predisposition to develop TMD during life.

== Nomenclature ==
COMT is the name given to the gene that codes for this enzyme. The O in the name stands for oxygen, not for ortho.

== COMT inhibitors ==
COMT inhibitors include entacapone, tolcapone, opicapone, and nitecapone. COMT inhibitors save levodopa from COMT and prolong the action of levodopa.

Levodopa, a precursor of catecholamines, is an important substrate of COMT. Levodopa is used in the treatment of Parkinson's disease, and suppressing peripheral levodopa metabolism through the COMT pathway is understood to be valuable for reducing end of dose motor fluctuations for those with Parkinson's. When given with an inhibitor of dopa decarboxylase (carbidopa or benserazide), levodopa is optimally saved. This "triple therapy" is becoming a standard in the treatment of Parkinson's disease.

Entacapone is a widely used adjunct drug of levodopa therapy. All COMT inhibitors except nitecapone are used in the treatment of Parkinson's disease. Risk of liver toxicity and related digestive disorders restricts the use of tolcapone.

== See also ==
- Dopamine
- Schizophrenia
- O-methyltransferase
