= Tolcapone =

Chemical compound

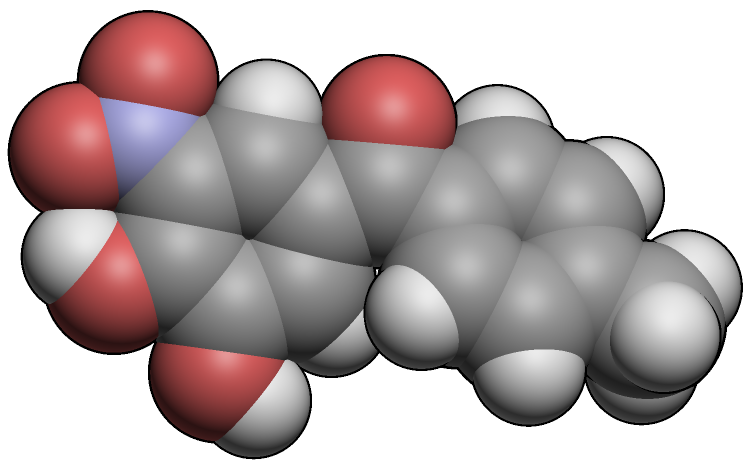

Clinical data
- Trade names: Tasmar
- AHFS/Drugs.com: Monograph
- MedlinePlus: a698036
- License data: EU EMA: by INN; US DailyMed: Tolcapone
- Pregnancy category: AU: B3
- Routes of administration: By mouth
- ATC code: N04BX01 (WHO)

Legal status
- Legal status: AU: S4 (Prescription only); BR: Class C1 (Other controlled substances); UK: POM (Prescription only); US: ℞-only; EU: Rx-only

Pharmacokinetic data
- Bioavailability: 65%
- Protein binding: >99.9%
- Metabolism: Liver (mainly glucuronidation)
- Elimination half-life: 2–3 hours
- Excretion: Urine (60%), feces (40%); only 0.5% in unmetabolized form

Identifiers
- IUPAC name: (3,4-Dihydroxy-5-nitrophenyl)(4-methylphenyl)methanone
- CAS Number: 134308-13-7
- PubChem CID: 4659569
- IUPHAR/BPS: 6646
- DrugBank: DB00323
- ChemSpider: 3848682
- UNII: CIF6334OLY
- KEGG: D00786
- ChEMBL: ChEMBL1324
- PDB ligand: TCW (PDBe, RCSB PDB)
- CompTox Dashboard (EPA): DTXSID3023685
- ECHA InfoCard: 100.222.604

Chemical and physical data
- Formula: C_{14}H_{11}NO_{5}
- Molar mass: 273.244 g·mol^{−1}
- 3D model (JSmol): Interactive image
- Melting point: 143 to 146 °C (289 to 295 °F)
- Solubility in water: not soluble
- SMILES: [O-][N+](=O)c2cc(C(=O)c1ccc(cc1)C)cc(O)c2O
- InChI: InChI=1S/C14H11NO5/c1-8-2-4-9(5-3-8)13(17)10-6-11(15(19)20)14(18)12(16)7-10/h2-7,16,18H,1H3; Key:MIQPIUSUKVNLNT-UHFFFAOYSA-N

Tolcapone, sold under the brand name Tasmar, is a medication used to treat Parkinson's disease (PD). It is a selective, potent and reversible nitrocatechol-type inhibitor of the enzyme catechol-O-methyltransferase (COMT). It has demonstrated significant liver toxicity, which has led to suspension of marketing authorisations in a number of countries.

Tolcapone appears to be peripherally selective, but can still cross into the brain in significant amounts and has been found to inhibit COMT centrally as well. In comparison with entacapone, another nitrocatechol COMT inhibitor, tolcapone has a longer half life (2.9 hours vs. 0.8 hours) and can better penetrate into the brain, acting both in the central nervous system and in the periphery. However, entacapone is less toxic for the liver.

== Medical uses ==
Tolcapone is used in the treatment of Parkinson's disease as an adjunct to levodopa/carbidopa or levodopa/benserazide medications. Levodopa is a prodrug for dopamine, which reduces Parkinson symptoms; carbidopa and benserazide are aromatic L-amino acid decarboxylase (AADC) inhibitors.

Without administration of tolcapone, the beneficial effects of levodopa tend to wear off more quickly, resulting in motor fluctuations.

== Contraindications ==
Combining tolcapone with non-selective monoamine oxidase inhibitors such as phenelzine or tranylcypromine is contraindicated. Tolcapone is also contraindicated for people with liver diseases or increased liver enzymes.

== Side effects ==
Tolcapone has demonstrated significant liver toxicity (hepatotoxicity) that limits the drug's utility. Entacapone is an alternative, largely since it has a more favorable toxicity profile.

The hepatotoxicity can be related to elevated levels of transaminases, but studies have shown that minimal risk exists for those without preexisting liver conditions when their enzyme levels were being monitored. No clear mechanism is implicated, but it has been hypothesized that it has something to do with abnormal mitochondrial respiration due to the uncoupling of oxidative phosphorylation.

Other side effects regard the increase in dopaminergic activity, including digestive symptoms. Treatment with tolcapone runs the risk of eliciting or prolonging dyskinesia; this can be counteracted by decreasing the dose of levodopa. This occurs because the administration of tolcapone results in the accumulation of the biological methyl donor S-adenosyl-L-methionine (SAM) in the striatum that induces Parkinson symptoms.

Digestive symptoms include nausea and diarrhea; further dopaminergic side effects include orthostatic hypotension, dry mouth, sweating and dizziness. Tolcapone causes more severe diarrhea than entacapone; this was the most common reason for therapy termination in studies. Urine discoloration comes from yellow tolcapone metabolites being excreted in the urine and is harmless.

== Interactions ==
While increase of dopamine levels is a desired interaction, tolcapone can theoretically also increase the levels of other drugs metabolised by COMT, such as the AADC inhibitors carbidopa and benserazide, as well as methyldopa, dobutamine, apomorphine, epinephrine (adrenaline), and isoprenaline. In studies, a slight interaction with benzerazide was seen, but not with carbidopa. Other interactions with this group of drugs have not been studied. A related type of theoretical interactions is with drugs that increase catecholamine concentrations, such as monoamine oxidase (MAO) inhibitors and norepinephrine reuptake inhibitors; these also showed only slight effects in practice. Combination with non-selective MAO inhibitors might be dangerous.

Due to its affinity to the liver enzyme CYP2C9, interactions with drugs being metabolised by this enzyme are also possible, but unlikely. No interaction with tolbutamide, a 2C9 substrate, was observed in studies.

== Pharmacology ==
=== Mechanism of action ===
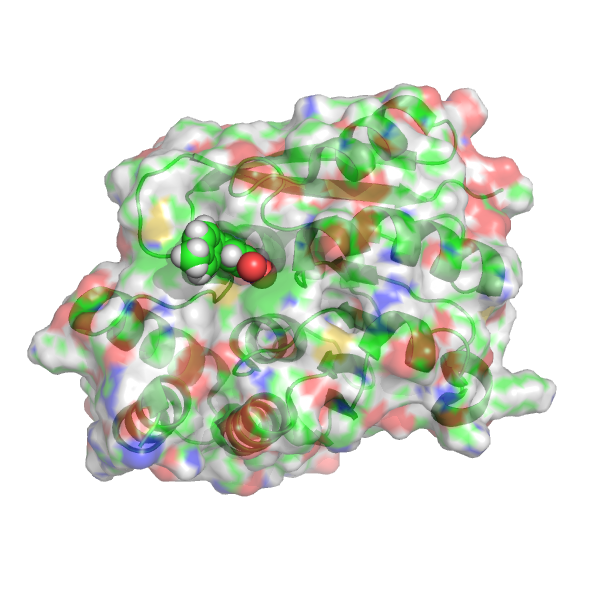
Rat catechol-O-methyltransferase bound to tolcapone. PDB entry 3s68.

Tolcapone selectively and reversibly binds to the catalytic site of COMT in both the periphery and the central nervous system (CNS) with greater affinity than any of the three catecholamines, including levodopa. It thereby prevents the 3-O-methylation of levodopa by COMT in the periphery, which produces 3-O-methyldopa, a major metabolite that competes with levodopa to cross the blood–brain barrier. More of the levodopa that is administered reaches the CNS. Additionally, levodopa that has already reached the CNS, after being converted to dopamine, will not be degraded as quickly when tolcapone inhibits COMT activity. Thus, tolcapone improves the bioavailability and reduces the clearance of levodopa and subsequently dopamine from the CNS.

3-O-Methylation of levodopa (3-hydroxy-L-tyrosine) via COMT activity

The strength of the binding affinity of tolcapone, represented by the inhibition constant K_{i} (2.5 nM), can be thought of as the dissociation constant for enzyme and inhibitor complex kinetics. Maximum catalytic activity denotes the efficacy of tolcapone (V_{max} = 58.4 pmol/min·mg).

=== Pharmacokinetics ===
Tolcapone is quickly absorbed from the gut to about 85%. It has an absolute bioavailability of 65%, which is only slightly decreased when taken with food. The substance reaches highest blood plasma concentrations after about two hours. When in the bloodstream, it is almost completely (>99.9%) bound to plasma proteins, primarily albumin. The main inactivation step is glucuronidation; other processes are methylation by COMT, hydroxylation by CYP3A4 and CYP2A6 with subsequent oxidation to a carboxylic acid, and possibly a minor path with reduction to an amine with subsequent acetylation.

The half-life of tolcapone is two to three hours, the volume of distribution (V_{d}) being 0.3 L/kg (21 L in an average 70 kg person). 60% of the metabolites are excreted via the urine and 40% via the feces. Only 0.5% of the drug are excreted in unchanged form via the urine.

Tolcapone and its metabolites. The reduction to the amine and subsequent N-acetylation is putative.

99% of tolcapone is in monoanionic form in the body because the physiological pH is 7.4. Tolcapone penetrates the blood–brain barrier much better than two other nitrocatechols, nitecapone and entacapone, because it has higher lipophilicity due to its R-substituent. Partition coefficients quantify the ability of the molecule to cross the blood–brain barrier. LogPIdce= 0.2, –1.4, –0.4 for tolcapone, nitecapone and entacopone respectively. Partition coefficients in this case were measured in 1,2-dichloroethane/H_{2}O solution which caused molecules to be in ionized form. There is no current explanation for how these charged molecules permeate the blood–brain barrier.

Tolcapone has been said to enter the central nervous system only minimally and hence would appear to be peripherally selective. However, tolcapone is more lipophilic than other COMT inhibitors like entacapone and may be more likely to cross the blood–brain barrier (BBB). A imaging study in humans found that tolcapone also inhibited COMT in the brain to a significant degree.

== Chemistry ==
Tolcapone is an intensely yellow, odorless, bitter tasting, non-hygroscopic, crystalline compound with a relative molecular mass of 273.25 g/mol. It melts at 143 to 146 °C (289 to 295 °F), is practically insoluble in water and acids but soluble in 0.1 M aqueous sodium hydroxide solution. The pK_{a} values are 4.5 and 10.6 for the two phenyl groups; and the maximum absorption is at 268 nm (in 0.1 M hydrochloric acid / ethanol). Its chemical name is 3,4-dihydroxy-4'-methyl-5-nitrobenzophenone.

=== Synthesis ===
A synthesis of tolcapone proposed in 2008, begins with a Grignard reaction between 4-Benzyloxy-3-methoxybenzaldehyde and p-tolyl magnesium bromide. The alcohol thus produced is then converted to a ketone using sodium t-butoxide. The benzyl protecting group is removed by palladium-catalyzed hydrogenation in the presence of ammonium formate. A nitro group is introduced at the 5-position adjacent to the hydroxyl group unmasked in the cleavage of the benzyl ether. The synthesis ends with cleavage of the methoxy group using aluminum chloride to yield the product alcohol.

Synthesis of tolcapone

== History ==
Tolcapone was introduced into the European market in August 1997, and subsequently into the United States market in March 1998. Liver toxicity was reported in four people who were administered tolcapone, three people died due to complications. Consequentially, the marketing authorization of tolcapone was suspended from December 1998 until August 2004 when it was lifted. In November 1998, the company that manufactured tolcapone voluntarily removed the drug from the market. The authorization was then renewed in August 2009.

As a result of reported complications, the US Food and Drug Administration (FDA) issued a black box warning for tolcapone and label revisions that aimed to regulate the monitoring of those prescribed tolcapone for Parkinson's disease in November 1998. A number of other countries withdrew tolcapone from the market; Australia in February 1999, Bulgaria in April 1999, Iceland in November 1998, Lithuania in December 1998.

== Research ==
=== Transthyretin amyloidosis ===
Because of preliminary data suggesting the drug may have activity, the U.S. FDA in 2013 granted tolcapone "orphan drug status" in studies aiming at the treatment of transthyretin familial amyloidosis (ATTR). However, as of 2015 tolcapone was not FDA approved for the treatment of this disease.

=== Psychiatric disorders ===
In animal studies, tolcapone shows antidepressant- and anti-anhedonia-like effects, stimulates exploratory behavior, and enhances the locomotor hyperactivity induced by psychostimulants like amphetamine and nomifensine. Tolcapone has been clinically studied in the treatment of certain psychiatric disorders such as obsessive–compulsive disorder (OCD) and for the negative symptoms of schizophrenia. There is also interest in brain-penetrant COMT inhibitors like tolcapone for the treatment of disorders of diminished motivation like apathy.
