= List of drugs: Df–Di =

This multi-page article lists pharmaceutical drugs alphabetically by name. Many drugs have more than one name and, therefore, the same drug may be listed more than once. Brand names and generic names are differentiated by capitalizing brand names.

See also the list of the top 100 bestselling branded drugs, ranked by sales.

Abbreviations are used in the list as follows:

- INN = International nonproprietary name
- BAN = British Approved Name
- USAN = United States Adopted Name
- Two-letter codes for countries

Lists of drugs
1–9 | A | B | C | D | E | F | G | H | I | J | K | L | M | N | O | P | Q | R | S | T | U | V | W | X | Y | Z

Da–Dd | De | Df–Di | Do | Dr–Dy

== dh ==
- DHC Plus

== di ==
- Di-Atro
- Di-Metrex

=== dia ===
- Diabeta (Sanofi-Aventis), known also as glyburide
- Diabinese, redirects to Chlorpropamide
- diacerein (INN)
- diacetamate (INN)
- diacetolol (INN)
- diacetylmorphine known also as diamorphine and heroin and by numerous street names
- Dial
- diamfenetide (INN)
- diamocaine (INN)
- diamorphine (INN), known also as diacetylmorphine and heroin and by numerous street names
- Diamox
- diampromide (INN)
- Dianeal
- dianicline (INN)
- Diapid
- diaplasinin (USAN, INN)
- diarbarone (INN)
- Diasone Sodium
- Diastat
- diathymosulfone (INN)
- diaveridine (INN)
- diazepam (INN)
- diaziquone (INN)
- diazoxide (INN)

=== dib ===
- dibekacin (INN)
- dibemethine (INN)
- Dibenil
- dibenzepin (INN)
- Dibenzyline
- dibotermin alfa (USAN)
- dibrompropamidine (INN)
- dibromsalan (INN)
- dibrospidium chloride (INN)
- dibuprol (INN)
- dibupyrone (INN)
- dibusadol (INN)

=== dic ===
==== dica-dicl ====
- dicarbine (INN)
- dicarfen (INN)
- dichlorisone (INN)
- dichlormezanone (INN)
- dichlorophen (INN)
- dichlorophenarsine (INN)
- dichloroxylenol (INN)
- dichlorvos (INN)
- diciferron (INN)
- dicirenone (INN)
- diclazuril (INN)
- diclofenac (INN)
- diclofenamide (INN)
- diclofensine (INN)
- diclofurime (INN)
- Diclohexal (Hexal Australia) [Au]. Redirects to diclofenac.
- diclometide (INN)
- diclonixin (INN)
- dicloralurea (INN)
- dicloxacillin (INN)

==== dico-dicy ====
- dicobalt edetate (INN)
- dicolinium iodide (INN)
- Dicopac Kit
- dicoumarol (INN)
- dicresulene (INN)
- Dicurin Procaine
- dicycloverine (INN)

=== did-die ===
- didanosine (INN)
- Didrex
- Didronel
- didrovaltrate (INN)
- dieldrin (INN)
- dienestrol (INN)
- dienogest (INN)
- diethadione (INN)
- diethazine (INN)
- diethylcarbamazine (INN)
- diethylstilbestrol (INN)
- diethylthiambutene (INN)
- diethyltoluamide (INN)
- dietifen (INN)

=== dif-dig ===
- difamilast (USAN, INN)
- difebarbamate (INN)
- difemerine (INN)
- difemetorex (INN)
- difenamizole (INN)
- difencloxazine (INN)
- difenidol (INN)
- difenoximide (INN)
- difenoxin (INN)
- difetarsone (INN)
- difeterol (INN)
- Differin
- Differin Epiduo Acne Gel
- diflorasone (INN)
- difloxacin (INN)
- difluanazine (INN)
- Diflucan
- diflucortolone (INN)
- diflumidone (INN)
- diflunisal (INN)
- difluprednate (INN)
- diftalone (INN)
- digitoxin (INN)
- digoxin (INN)

=== dih-dil ===
- dihexyverine (INN)
- dihydralazine (INN)
- dihydrocodeine (INN)
- dihydroergotamine (INN)
- dihydroergotamine mesilate
- dihydroergotamine mesylate
- dihydrotachysterol (INN)
- diiodohydroxyquinoline (INN)
- diisopromine (INN)
- Dilacor XR
- Dilantin
- Dilatrate-SR
- Dilaudid
- dilazep (INN)
- dilevalol (INN)
- dilmapimod (USAN, INN)
- dilmefone (INN)
- Dilor
- dilopetine (INN)
- diloxanide (INN)
- Dilt-CD
- Diltahexal (Hexal Australia) [Au]. Redirects to diltiazem.
- diltiazem (INN)

=== dim ===
==== dima ====
- dimabefylline (INN)
- dimadectin (INN)
- dimantine (INN)
- dimazole (INN)

==== dime ====
===== dimec-dimes =====
- dimecamine (INN)
- dimecolonium iodide (INN)
- dimecrotic acid (INN)
- dimefadane (INN)
- dimefline (INN)
- dimelazine (INN)
- dimemorfan (INN)
- dimenhydrinate (INN)
- dimenoxadol (INN)
- dimepheptanol (INN)
- dimepranol (INN)
- dimepregnen (INN)
- dimeprozan (INN)
- dimercaprol (INN)
- dimesna (INN)
- dimesone (INN)

===== dimet-dimev =====
- dimetacrine (INN)
- dimetamfetamine (INN)
- Dimetane
- Dimetapp
- dimethadione (INN)
- dimethazan (INN)
- dimethiodal sodium (INN)
- dimethisterone (INN)
- dimetholizine (INN)
- dimethoxanate (INN)
- dimethyl fumarate (USAN)
- dimethyl sulfoxide (INN)
- dimethylthiambutene (INN)
- dimethyltryptamine
- dimethyltubocurarinium chloride (INN)
- dimetindene (INN)
- dimetipirium bromide (INN)
- dimetofrine (INN)
- dimetotiazine (INN)
- dimetridazole (INN)
- dimevamide (INN)

==== dimi-dimp ====
- diminazene (INN)
- dimiracetam (INN)
- dimoxaprost (INN)
- dimoxyline (INN)
- dimpylate (INN)

=== din-dio ===
- dinaciclib (USAN, INN)
- dinalin (INN)
- dinazafone (INN)
- diniprofylline (INN)
- dinitolmide (INN)
- dinoprost (INN)
- dinoprostone (INN)
- dinsed (INN)
- diodone (INN)
- Dionosil Aqueous
- diosmin (INN)
- Diovan
- dioxadilol (INN)
- dioxadrol (INN)
- dioxamate (INN)
- dioxaphetyl butyrate (INN)
- dioxation (INN)
- dioxethedrin (INN)
- dioxifedrine (INN)
- dioxybenzone (INN)

=== dip ===
==== dipe-dipo ====
- Dipentum
- diperodon (INN)
- diphemanil metilsulfate (INN)
- Diphen
- diphenadione (INN)
- diphenan (INN)
- diphenhydramine (INN)
- diphenoxylate (INN)
- Diphenylan Sodium
- diphenylpyraline (INN)
- diphoxazide (INN)
- dipipanone (INN)
- dipiproverine (INN)
- dipivefrine (INN)
- diponium bromide (INN)
- dipotassium clorazepate (INN)

==== dipr-dipy ====
- diprafenone (INN)
- dipraglurant (INN)
- diprenorphine (INN)
- Diprivan
- diprobutine (INN)
- diprofene (INN)
- diprogulic acid (INN)
- diproleandomycin (INN)
- Diprolene
- diprophylline (INN)
- diproqualone (INN)
- Diprosone
- diproteverine (INN)
- diproxadol (INN)
- dipyridamole (INN)
- dipyrithione (INN)
- dipyrocetyl (INN)

=== diq-dis ===
- diquafosol (INN)
- dirithromycin (INN)
- dirlotapide (USAN)
- dirucotide (USAN, INN)
- Discase
- Disipal
- disiquonium chloride (INN)
- disitertide (INN)
- Disobrom
- disobutamide (INN)
- Disodium Edetate
- disofenin (INN)
- disogluside (INN)
- Disomer
- disomotide (USAN, INN)
- Disophrol
- disopyramide (INN)
- disoxaril (INN)
- Dispermox
- distigmine bromide (INN)
- disufenton sodium (USAN)
- disulergine (INN)
- disulfamide (INN)
- Disulfiram
- disulfiram (INN)
- disuprazole (INN)

=== dit-diz ===
- Ditate-DS
- ditazole (INN)
- ditekiren (INN)
- ditercalinium chloride (INN)
- dithiazanine iodide (INN)
- dithranol (INN)
- ditiocade sodium (USAN)
- ditiocarb sodium (INN)
- ditiomustine (INN)
- ditolamide (INN)
- ditophal (INN)
- Ditropan
- Diucardin
- Diulo
- Diupres
- Diuril
- Diutensen-R
- divabuterol (INN)
- divaplon (INN)
- dixanthogen (INN)
- Dizac
- dizatrifone (INN)
- dizocilpine (INN)
