= GYKI-32887 =

Clinical data
- Other names: GYKI32887; RGH-7825; RGH7825; 8-((N-2-Azidoethyl-N-methylsulfonylamino)methyl)-6-methylergol-8-ene
- Drug class: Dopamine agonist; Antiparkinsonian agent
- ATC code: None

Identifiers
- IUPAC name: N-[[(6aR,10aR)-7-methyl-6,6a,8,10a-tetrahydro-4H-indolo[4,3-fg]quinolin-9-yl]methyl]-N-(2-azidoethyl)methanesulfonamide
- PubChem CID: 174135
- ChemSpider: 151934

Chemical and physical data
- Formula: C_{19}H_{24}N_{6}O_{2}S
- Molar mass: 400.50 g·mol^{−1}
- 3D model (JSmol): Interactive image
- SMILES: CN1CC(=C[C@H]2[C@H]1CC3=CNC4=CC=CC2=C34)CN(CCN=[N+]=[N-])S(=O)(=O)C
- InChI: InChI=1S/C19H24N6O2S/c1-24-11-13(12-25(28(2,26)27)7-6-22-23-20)8-16-15-4-3-5-17-19(15)14(10-21-17)9-18(16)24/h3-5,8,10,16,18,21H,6-7,9,11-12H2,1-2H3/t16-,18-/m1/s1; Key:KHWYJNRYIAULDT-SJLPKXTDSA-N

GYKI-32887, also known as RGH-7825, is a dopamine agonist and antiparkinsonian agent of the ergoline family which was never marketed. It has a lysergamide-like structure but is not technically a lysergamide itself. Similarly to other D_{2}-like receptor agonists, direct injection of small doses of GYK-32887 into the nucleus accumbens decreases locomotor activity in rodents. This effect can be blocked by D_{2}-like receptor antagonists like haloperidol, fluphenazine, and sulpiride. GYKI-32887 was first described in the scientific literature by 1983.

== See also ==
- Disulergine
- Etisulergine
- Mesulergine
- Quinagolide
