= C16H24N2O4 =

The molecular formula C_{16}H_{24}N_{2}O_{4} (molar mass: 308.37 g/mol) may refer to:

- Diacetolol
- Hydroxycarteolol
- Nitracaine
- Ubenimex, or bestatin
