= C26H35NO4 =

The molecular formula C_{26}H_{35}NO_{4} may refer to:

- Diprenorphine
- Diproteverine
- Lythranidine
