= C21H26N2O4 =

The molecular formula C_{21}H_{26}N_{2}O_{4} (molar mass: 370.44 g/mol) may refer to:

- Ciladopa (AY-27,110)
- Samidorphan (ALKS-33)
- Scholarine
