= Quinelorane =

Chemical compound

Identifiers
- IUPAC name: (5aR,9aR)-6-propyl-5a,7,8,9,9a,10-hexahydro-5H-pyrido[2,3-g]quinazolin-2-amine
- CAS Number: 97466-90-5; HCl: 97548-97-5
- PubChem CID: 57242
- IUPHAR/BPS: 954
- ChemSpider: 51604
- UNII: Z0X4VT3Y1Q; HCl: JT5527J55O
- KEGG: D05677
- ChEMBL: ChEMBL155731
- CompTox Dashboard (EPA): DTXSID4046315

Chemical and physical data
- Formula: C_{14}H_{22}N_{4}
- Molar mass: 246.358 g·mol^{−1}
- 3D model (JSmol): Interactive image
- SMILES: CCCN1CCC[C@H]2[C@H]1CC3=CN=C(N=C3C2)N
- InChI: InChI=1S/C14H22N4/c1-2-5-18-6-3-4-10-7-12-11(8-13(10)18)9-16-14(15)17-12/h9-10,13H,2-8H2,1H3,(H2,15,16,17)/t10-,13-/m1/s1; Key:TUFADSGTJUOBEH-ZWNOBZJWSA-N

Quinelorane is a drug which acts as a dopamine agonist for the D_{2} and D_{3} receptor.

== See also ==
- List of investigational Parkinson's disease drugs
- Quinpirole
- Quinagolide
