= C18H30N2O2 =

The molecular formula C_{18}H_{30}N_{2}O_{2} (molar mass: 306.45 g/mol) may refer to:

- Butacaine
- N,N-Dipropyldimethocaine
