= C23H31NO3 =

The molecular formula C_{23}H_{31}NO_{3} (molar mass: 369.50 g/mol, exact mass: 369.2304 u) may refer to:

- Diprafenone
- Norgestimate
