= 4-Hydroxyamphetamine =

Group of stereoisomers

Hydroxyamphetamine INN: Hydroxyamfetamine
- racemic mixture

Clinical data
- Trade names: Paredrine, Paremyd, Pedrolon, Mycadrine, Paredrinex, others
- Other names: 4-Hydroxyamphetamine; 4-HA; Hydroxyamfetamine; Oxamphetamine; Norpholedrine; para-Hydroxyamphetamine; PHA; α-Methyltyramine; Methyltyramine, Hydroxyamphetamine (USAN US)
- Routes of administration: Eye drops
- Drug class: Serotonin-norepinephrine releasing agent; Sympathomimetic; Stimulant
- ATC code: None

Legal status
- Legal status: In general: ℞ (Prescription only)

Identifiers
- IUPAC name: 4-(2-aminopropyl)phenol
- CAS Number: 103-86-6
- PubChem CID: 3651
- ChemSpider: 3525
- UNII: FQR280JW2N
- ChEMBL: ChEMBL1546
- CompTox Dashboard (EPA): DTXSID3023134
- ECHA InfoCard: 100.002.866

Chemical and physical data
- Formula: C_{9}H_{13}NO
- Molar mass: 151.209 g·mol^{−1}
- 3D model (JSmol): Interactive image
- SMILES: NC(C)Cc1ccc(O)cc1
- InChI: InChI=1S/C9H13NO/c1-7(10)6-8-2-4-9(11)5-3-8/h2-5,7,11H,6,10H2,1H3; Key:GIKNHHRFLCDOEU-UHFFFAOYSA-N

Hydroxyamphetamine, also known as 4-hydroxyamphetamine or norpholedrine and sold under the brand names Paredrine and Paremyd among others, is a sympathomimetic medication used in eye drops to dilate the pupil for eye examinations.

Hydroxyamfetamine acts as a norepinephrine releasing agent and hence is an indirectly acting sympathomimetic. It is a substituted phenethylamine and amphetamine.

Hydroxyamphetamine appeared to remain marketed only in the Czech Republic as of 2004.

== Medical uses ==
Hydroxyamphetamine is used in eye drops to dilate the pupil (a process called mydriasis) so that the back of the eye can be examined. This is a diagnostic test for Horner's syndrome. Patients with Horner's syndrome exhibit anisocoria brought about by lesions on the nerves that connect to the nasociliary branch of the ophthalmic nerve. Application of hydroxyamphetamine to the eye can indicate whether the lesion is preganglionic or postganglionic based on the pupil's response. If the pupil dilates, the lesion is preganglionic. If the pupil does not dilate, the lesion is postganglionic.

Hydroxyamphetamine has some limitations to its use as a diagnostic tool. If it is intended as an immediate follow up to another mydriatic drug (cocaine or apraclonidine), then the patient must wait anywhere from a day to a week before hydroxyamphetamine can be administered. It also has the tendency to falsely localize lesions. False localization can arise in cases of acute onset; in cases where a postganglionic lesion is present, but the nerve still responds to residual norepinephrine; or in cases in which unrelated nerve damage masks the presence of a preganglionic lesion.

=== Available forms ===
Hydroxyamphetamine is a component of two controlled (prescription only), name-brand ophthalmic mydriatics: Paredrine and Paremyd. Paredrine consists of a 1% solution of hydroxyamphetamine hydrobromide while Paremyd consists of a combination of 1% hydroxyamphetamine hydrobromide and 0.25% tropicamide.

== Pharmacology ==
=== Pharmacodynamics ===
Hydroxyamphetamine acts as an indirect sympathomimetic and induces the release of norepinephrine which leads to mydriasis (pupil dilation).

It has also been found to act as a serotonin releasing agent. The drug produces the head-twitch response, a behavioral proxy of psychedelic effects, when it is given by intracerebroventricular injection in animals. This effect is blocked by the serotonin receptor antagonists cyproheptadine and dimethothiazine, by the serotonin reuptake inhibitor fluoxetine, and by the serotonin synthesis inhibitor para-chlorophenylalanine (PCPA). These findings suggest that hydroxyamphetamine-induced head twitches are due to activation of the serotonin 5-HT_{2A} receptor and that they are mediated by induction of serotonin release as opposed to direct agonism of the serotonin 5-HT_{2A} receptor. Although hydroxyamphetamine produces the head-twitch response in animals, serotonin releasing agents are not necessarily hallucinogenic in humans, and hence their induction of head twitches in animals has been considered a false positive for psychedelic effects.

It additionally decreases metabolism of serotonin and certain other monoamines by inhibiting the activity of monoamine oxidases (MAOs), particularly type A (MAO-A). The inhibition of MAO-A prevents metabolism of serotonin and catecholamines in the presynaptic terminal, and thus increases the amount of neurotransmitters available for release into the synaptic cleft.

Like amphetamine, hydroxyamphetamine is an agonist of human TAAR1.

=== Pharmacokinetics ===
Hydroxyamphetamine is a major metabolite of amphetamine and a minor metabolite of methamphetamine. In humans, amphetamine is metabolized to hydroxyamphetamine by CYP2D6, which is a member of the cytochrome P450 superfamily and is found in the liver. 4-Hydroxyamphetamine is then metabolized by dopamine β-hydroxylase into 4-hydroxynorephedrine or eliminated in the urine.

Metabolic pathways of amphetamine in humans
In humans, 4-hydroxyamphetamine is formed from CYP2D6 metabolism of amphetamine; 4-hydroxyamphetamine may subsequently be metabolized by dopamine β-hydroxylase into 4-hydroxynorephedrine.

== Chemistry ==
Hydroxyamphetamine, also known as 4-hydroxy-α-methylphenethylamine, 4-hydroxyamphetamine, or α-methyltyramine, is a substituted phenethylamine and amphetamine derivative. It is the 4-hydroxylated analogue of amphetamine, the N-demethylated analogue of pholedrine (4-hydroxy-N-methylamphetamine), and the α-methylated analogue of tyramine (4-hydroxyphenethylamine). Other analogues include α-methyldopamine, corbadrine (levonordefrin; α-methylnorepinephrine), and dioxifedrine (α-methylepinephrine).

It has a predicted log P of 0.58 to 1.4.

Hydroxyamphetamine is used pharmaceutically as the hydrobromide salt.

== History ==
Hydroxyamphetamine was first synthesized by 1910.

In the 1990s, the trade name rights, patents, and new drug applications (NDAs) for Paredrine and Paremyd were exchanged among a few different manufacturers after a shortage of the raw material required for their production, which caused both drugs to be indefinitely removed from the market. Around 1997, Akorn, Inc., obtained the rights to both Paredrine and Paremyd, and in 2002, the company reintroduced Paremyd to the market as a fast acting ophthalmic mydriatic agent.

In 2004, hydroxyamphetamine appeared to remain marketed only in the Czech Republic.

== Society and culture ==
=== Names ===
Hydroxyamphetamine is the generic name of the drug and its BAN and DCF, while hydroxyamfetamine is its INN. In the case of the hydrobromide salt, its generic name is hydroxyamphetamine hydrobromide and this is its USAN. It is also known by synonyms including methyltyramine, norpholedrine, and oxamphetamine. The drug is sold under brand names including Paredrine, Paredrinex, Paremyd, Pedrolon, and Mycadrine.

== Other drugs ==
4-Hydroxyamphetamine is also a metabolite of amphetamine and certain other amphetamines.
