= Debenzergoline =

Clinical data
- Other names: Propyldebenzergoline
- Drug class: Dopamine receptor agonist
- ATC code: None

Identifiers
- IUPAC name: trans-(±)-2,3,4,4a,5,7,9,9a-octahydro-1-propyl-1H-pyrrolo[3,4-g]quinoline
- PubChem CID: 12902677
- ChemSpider: 96353452

Chemical and physical data
- Formula: C_{14}H_{22}N_{2}
- Molar mass: 218.344 g·mol^{−1}
- 3D model (JSmol): Interactive image
- SMILES: C1C2CC3=CN([H])C=C3C[C@@]2([H])N(CCC)CC1
- InChI: InChI=1S/C14H22N2/c1-2-5-16-6-3-4-11-7-12-9-15-10-13(12)8-14(11)16/h9-11,14-15H,2-8H2,1H3/t11?,14-/m1/s1; Key:QLJJALZPNURUSU-SBXXRYSUSA-N

Debenzergoline, or propyldebenzergoline, is a dopamine receptor agonist and partial ergoline. It is an analogue of ergoline in which the A ring of the ergoline ring system has been removed. The drug strongly inhibits prolactin secretion and produces antiparkinsonian effects in rodents. Debenzergoline was first described in the scientific literature by 1980.

== See also ==
- Partial lysergamide
- Quinpirole
