= Scholaricine =

Names
- IUPAC name Methyl (19S)-12,19-Dihydroxy-2,16-didehydrocuran-17-oate
- Systematic IUPAC name Methyl (3aS,5S,11bR,12S)-8-hydroxy-12-[(1S)-1-hydroxyethyl]-1,2,3a,4,5,7-hexahydro-3,5-ethanopyrrolo[2,3-d]carbazole-6-carboxylate

Identifiers
CAS Number	99694-90-3
3D model (JSmol)	Interactive image
ChEBI	CHEBI:70516
ChEMBL	ChEMBL1651108
ChemSpider	65322251
PubChem CID	50900051
- InChI: InChI=1S/C20H24N2O4/c1-10(23)12-9-22-7-6-20-13-4-3-5-14(24)17(13)21-18(20)16(19(25)26-2)11(12)8-15(20)22/h3-5,10-12,15,21,23-24H,6-9H2,1-2H3/t10-,11-,12-,15-,20+/m0/s1 Key: GNCUCBQZLQLSOF-IGWMUPSQSA-N
- SMILES: C[C@@H]([C@@H]1CN2CC[C@@]34[C@@H]2C[C@@H]1C(=C3NC5=C4C=CC=C5O)C(=O)OC)O

Properties
Chemical formula	C_{20}H_{24}N_{2}O_{4}
Molar mass	356.422 g·mol^{−1}
- Except where otherwise noted, data are given for materials in their standard state (at 25 °C [77 °F], 100 kPa). Infobox references

Scholaricine is an alkaloid that has been isolated from Alstonia boonei, a tree of West Africa.

== See also ==
- Scholarine
