= Rotigotine =

Dopamine agonist medication

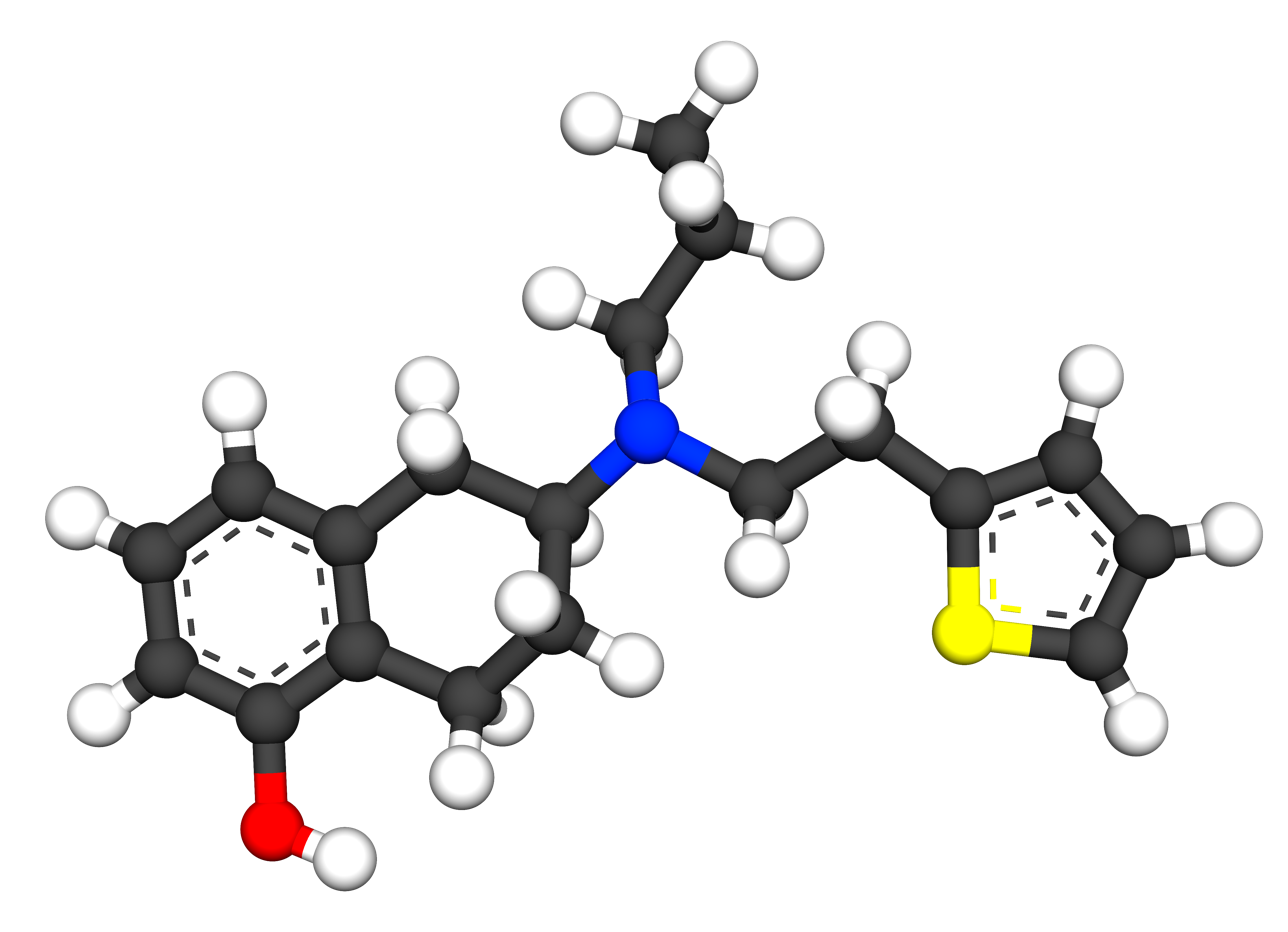

Clinical data
- Trade names: Neupro, Leganto
- AHFS/Drugs.com: Monograph
- MedlinePlus: a607059
- License data: US DailyMed: Rotigotine
- Pregnancy category: AU: B3
- Routes of administration: Transdermal
- Drug class: Dopamine agonist; Antiparkinsonian; Antidepressant
- ATC code: N04BC09 (WHO)

Legal status
- Legal status: AU: S4 (Prescription only); BR: Class C1 (Other controlled substances); US: ℞-only; EU: Rx-only; In general: ℞ (Prescription only)

Pharmacokinetic data
- Bioavailability: 37% (transdermal)
- Protein binding: 92%
- Metabolism: Liver (CYP-mediated)
- Elimination half-life: 5–7 hours
- Excretion: Urine (71%), Feces (23%)

Identifiers
- IUPAC name: (S)-6-[Propyl(2-thiophen-2-ylethyl)amino]-5,6,7,8- tetrahydronaphthalen-1-ol
- CAS Number: 99755-59-6
- PubChem CID: 57537
- IUPHAR/BPS: 941
- DrugBank: DB05271
- ChemSpider: 51867
- UNII: 87T4T8BO2E
- KEGG: D05768
- ChEMBL: ChEMBL1303
- CompTox Dashboard (EPA): DTXSID5046772
- ECHA InfoCard: 100.123.257

Chemical and physical data
- Formula: C_{19}H_{25}NOS
- Molar mass: 315.48 g·mol^{−1}
- 3D model (JSmol): Interactive image
- SMILES: Oc1cccc3c1CCC(N(CCC)CCc2sccc2)C3
- InChI: InChI=1S/C19H25NOS/c1-2-11-20(12-10-17-6-4-13-22-17)16-8-9-18-15(14-16)5-3-7-19(18)21/h3-7,13,16,21H,2,8-12,14H2,1H3; Key:KFQYTPMOWPVWEJ-UHFFFAOYSA-N

Rotigotine, sold under the brand name Neupro among others, is a dopamine agonist of the non-ergoline class of medications indicated for the treatment of Parkinson's disease and restless legs syndrome. It is formulated as a once-daily transdermal patch which provides a slow and constant supply of the drug over the course of 24 hours.

Like other dopamine agonists, rotigotine has been shown to possess antidepressant effects and may be useful in the treatment of depression as well.

== Side effects ==
General side effects for rotigotine may include constipation, dyskinesia, nausea, vomiting, dizziness, fatigue, insomnia, somnolence, confusion, and hallucinations. More serious complications can include psychosis and impulse-control disorders like hypersexuality, punding, and pathological gambling. Mild adverse skin reactions at the patch application site may also occur.

== Pharmacology ==
Rotigotine acts as a non-selective agonist of the dopamine D_{1}, D_{2}, D_{3}, and, to a lesser extent, D_{4} and D_{5} receptors, with highest affinity for the D_{3} receptor. In terms of affinity, rotigotine has 10-fold selectivity for the D_{3} receptor over the D_{2}, D_{4}, and D_{5} receptors and 100-fold selectivity for the D_{3} receptor over the D_{1} receptor. In functional studies however, rotigotine behaves as a full agonist of D_{1}, D_{2}, and D_{3} with similar potencies (EC_{50}). Its ability to activate both D_{1}-like and D_{2}-like receptors is similar to the case of apomorphine (which notably has greater efficacy in the treatment of Parkinson's disease than D_{2}-like-selective agonists but has suboptimal pharmacokinetic properties) and pergolide but unlike pramipexole and ropinirole.

In vitro receptor binding profile of rotigotine
Receptor	K_{i} (nM)
D_{1}	83
D_{2}	13.5
D_{3}	0.71
D_{4.2}	3.9
D_{4.4}	15
D_{4.7}	5.9
D_{5}	5.4
α_{1A}	176
α_{1B}	273
α_{2A}	338
α_{2B}	27
α_{2C}	135
5-HT_{1A}	30
5-HT_{7}	86
H_{1}	330

All affinities listed were assayed using human materials except that for α_{2B}-adrenergic which was done with NG 108–15 cells. Rotigotine behaves as a partial or full agonist (depending on the assay) at all dopamine receptors listed, as an antagonist at the α_{2B}-adrenergic receptor, and as a partial agonist at the 5-HT_{1A} receptor. Though it has affinity for a large number of sites as shown above, at clinical doses rotigotine behaves mostly as a selective D_{1}-like (D_{1}, D_{5}) and D_{2}-like (D_{2}, D_{3}, D_{4}) receptor agonist, with its α_{2B}-adrenergic and 5-HT_{1A} activity also possibly having some minor relevance.

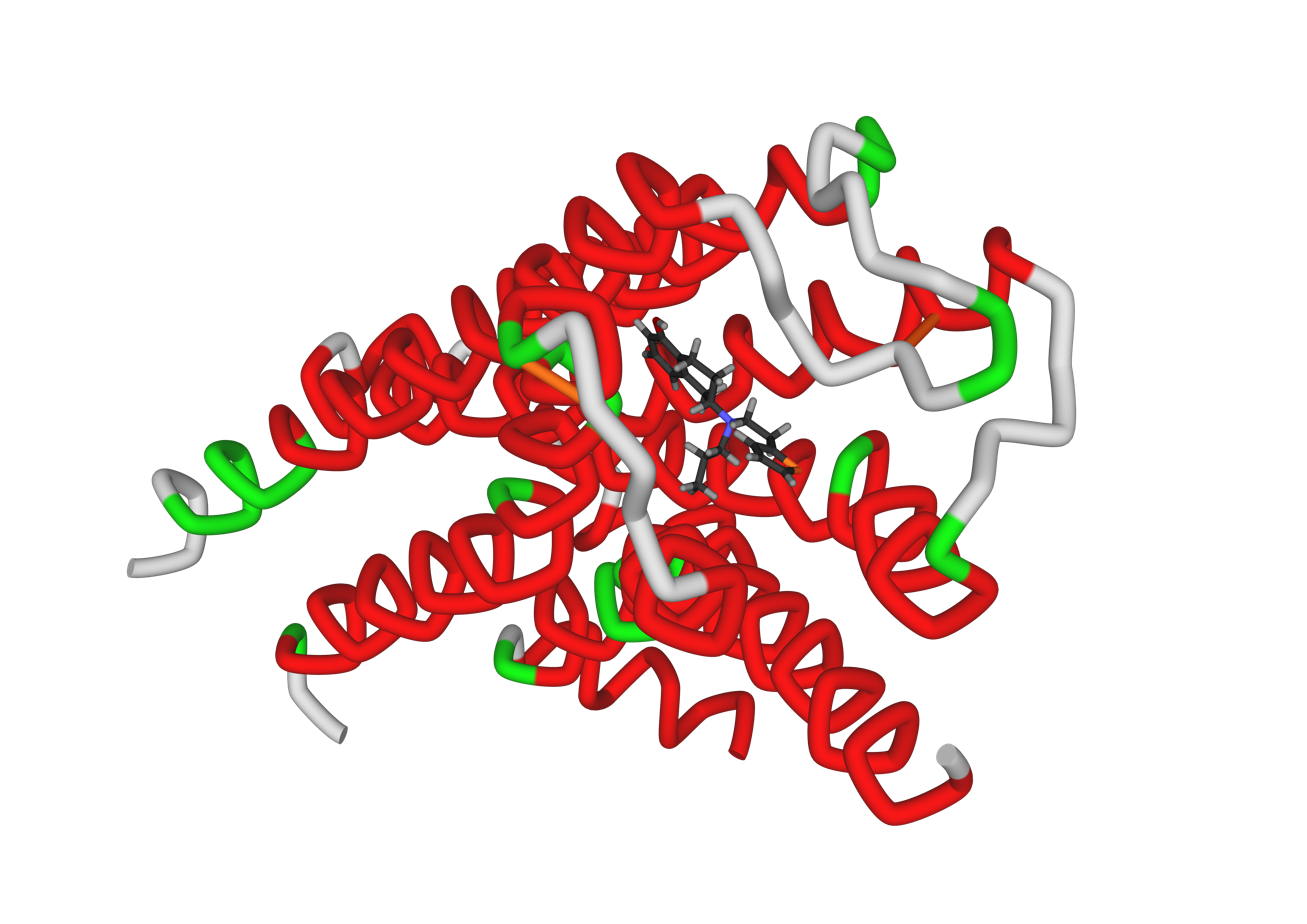
Rotigotine bound to the Dopamine D_{2} receptor PDB ID 7X2C

== History ==
Initially developed at the University of Groningen in 1985 as N-0437, Aderis Pharmaceuticals acquired rotigotine and continued development toward commercialization. In 1998, Aderis globally out-licensed rotigotine for development and commercialization to Schwarz Pharma, which firm was acquired by UCB S.A. in 2006. Schwarz completed acquisition of full rights to rotigotine from Aderis as of 2005.

The drug was approved by the European Medicines Agency (EMA) for use in Europe in 2006. In 2007, the Neupro patch was approved by the US Food and Drug Administration (FDA). It became the first transdermal treatment of Parkinson's disease in the United States. In 2008, Schwarz Pharma recalled all Neupro patches in the United States and some in Europe because of problems with the delivery mechanism. FDA also suspended its marketing authorization after crystal formation was noted in some patches. The patch was reformulated, and was reintroduced in the United States in 2012.

Rotigotine was authorized as a treatment for restless legs syndrome in the European Union in August 2008.
