= Dirucotide =

Chemical compound

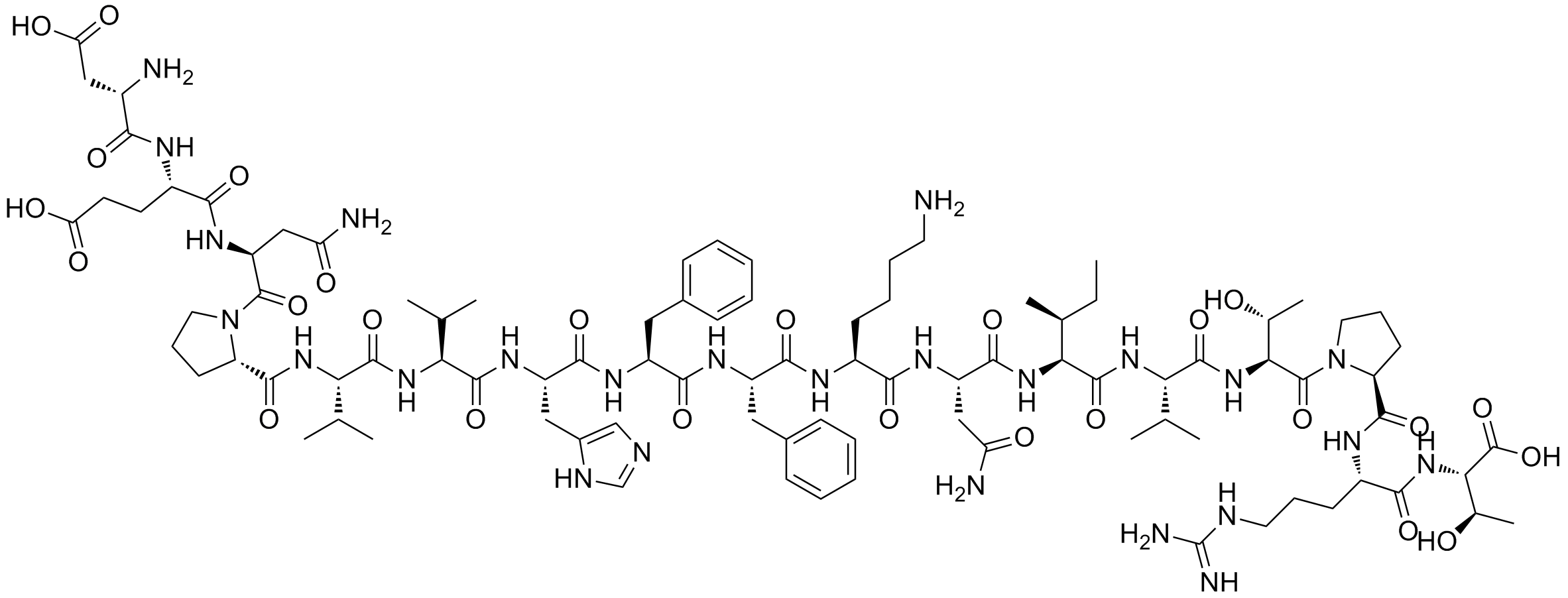

Clinical data
- Routes of administration: intravenous
- ATC code: none

Identifiers
- IUPAC name: L-α-aspartyl-L-α-glutamyl-L-asparaginyl-L-prolyl-L-valyl- L-valyl-L-histidyl-L-phenylalanyl-L-phenylalanyl-L-lysyl- L-asparaginyl-L-isoleucyl-L-valyl-L-threonyl-L-prolyl- L-arginyl-L-threonine
- CAS Number: 152074-97-0
- ChemSpider: 30791396
- UNII: 26188K0CWH
- KEGG: D09396
- CompTox Dashboard (EPA): DTXSID101336603

Chemical and physical data
- Formula: C_{92}H_{141}N_{25}O_{26}
- Molar mass: 2013.289 g·mol^{−1}
- 3D model (JSmol): Interactive image
- SMILES: CC[C@H](C)[C@@H](C(=O)N[C@@H](C(C)C)C(=O)N[C@@H]([C@@H](C)O)C(=O)N1CCC[C@H]1C(=O)N[C@@H](CCCNC(=N)N)C(=O)N[C@@H]([C@@H](C)O)C(=O)O)NC(=O)[C@H](CC(=O)N)NC(=O)[C@H](CCCCN)NC(=O)[C@H](Cc2ccccc2)NC(=O)[C@H](Cc3ccccc3)NC(=O)[C@H](Cc4cnc[nH]4)NC(=O)[C@H](C(C)C)NC(=O)[C@H](C(C)C)NC(=O)[C@@H]5CCCN5C(=O)[C@H](CC(=O)N)NC(=O)[C@H](CCC(=O)O)NC(=O)[C@H](CC(=O)O)N
- InChI: InChI=1S/C92H141N25O26/c1-11-48(8)72(88(139)112-71(47(6)7)87(138)114-73(49(9)118)90(141)117-36-22-29-63(117)83(134)104-56(28-20-34-100-92(97)98)78(129)115-74(50(10)119)91(142)143)113-82(133)61(41-65(95)120)107-76(127)55(27-18-19-33-93)103-79(130)58(37-51-23-14-12-15-24-51)105-80(131)59(38-52-25-16-13-17-26-52)106-81(132)60(39-53-43-99-44-101-53)108-85(136)69(45(2)3)111-86(137)70(46(4)5)110-84(135)64-30-21-35-116(64)89(140)62(42-66(96)121)109-77(128)57(31-32-67(122)123)102-75(126)54(94)40-68(124)125/h12-17,23-26,43-50,54-64,69-74,118-119H,11,18-22,27-42,93-94H2,1-10H3,(H2,95,120)(H2,96,121)(H,99,101)(H,102,126)(H,103,130)(H,104,134)(H,105,131)(H,106,132)(H,107,127)(H,108,136)(H,109,128)(H,110,135)(H,111,137)(H,112,139)(H,113,133)(H,114,138)(H,115,129)(H,122,123)(H,124,125)(H,142,143)(H4,97,98,100)/t48-,49+,50+,54-,55-,56-,57-,58-,59-,60-,61-,62-,63-,64-,69-,70-,71-,72-,73-,74-/m0/s1; Key:RCTCWZRPYFBGLQ-WMCRPSJMSA-N

Dirucotide (also known as MBP8298) was developed by two research scientists (Dr. Kenneth G. Warren, MD, FRCP(C) & Ingrid Catz, Senior Scientist) at the University of Alberta for the treatment of Multiple Sclerosis (MS). Dirucotide is a synthetic peptide that consists of 17 amino acids linked in a sequence identical to that of a portion of human myelin basic protein (MBP). The sequence of these 17 amino acids is

- H_{2}N-Asp-Glu-Asn-Pro-Val-Val-His-Phe-Phe-Lys-Asn-Ile-Val-Thr-Pro-Arg-Thr-OH

== Research ==
Results from a phase II and long-term follow-up trial showed that dirucotide safely delayed median time to disease progression for five years in progressive MS patients with HLA-DR2 or HLA-DR4 immune response genes. It does not seem to be effective in patients with other gene variants.

The drug is exclusively licensed by BioMS Medical Corp., a Canadian-based biotechnology company. BioMS Medical received clearance from the Food & Drug Administration (FDA) to initiate a phase III clinical trial, named MAESTRO-03, for secondary progressive MS patients in January 2007. An additional Phase III clinical trial for dirucotide, MAESTRO-01, is being undertaken in Canada and Europe. In September 2008, the drug was granted FDA fast-track for approval.

A phase II trial of Dirucotide as a potential therapy for relapsing-remitting multiple sclerosis (RRMS), MINDSET-01, failed to achieve its primary endpoint of reduced relapse rate. Nor did it reduce new MRI lesions. It did however reduce progression on the Expanded Disability Status Scale (EDSS) and the Multiple Sclerosis Functional Composite (MSFC) scale. Phase III trials are now in progress with reduction of EDSS and MSFC progression as primary endpoints.

BioMS Medical has agreed to share development of dirucotide with Eli Lilly and Company, which received exclusive worldwide rights to future research and development, manufacturing, and marketing of the compound.

== Mechanism of action ==
T cells producing receptors recognizing MBP fragments presented by the MHC molecules of antigen presenting cells seem to play a role in the pathogenesis of MS. Repeated application of dirucotide (intravenous, every six months) represses immunological response against MBP.

== Status of the development ==
On 27 July 2009, a statement was released, stating "BioMS Medical Corp. (TSX: MS) today announced that dirucotide did not meet the primary endpoint of delaying disease progression, as measured by the Expanded Disability Status Scale (EDSS), during the two-year MAESTRO-01 Phase III trial in patients with secondary progressive multiple sclerosis (SPMS). In addition, there were no statistically significant differences between dirucotide and placebo on the secondary endpoints of the study", this means that the MAESTRO-02 and MAESTRO-03 trials are discontinued.
