= N,N-Dipropyldimethocaine =

Identifiers
- IUPAC name: (3-Dipropylamino-2,2-dimethylpropyl)-4-aminobenzoate

Chemical and physical data
- Formula: C_{18}H_{30}N_{2}O_{2}
- Molar mass: 306.450 g·mol^{−1}
- 3D model (JSmol): Interactive image
- SMILES: CC(C)(COC(=O)c1ccc(N)cc1)CN(CCC)CCC

N,N-Dipropyldimethocaine (N-dipropyl-Dimethocaine, DPDMC) is a synthetic compound which acts as a local anesthetic with stimulant properties. It is a homologue of dimethocaine with an N,N-dipropyl group in place of the N,N-diethyl group, and has similar stimulant effects. It has been added to the list of controlled drugs in Hungary.

== See also ==
- 3-(p-Fluorobenzoyloxy)tropane
- Nitracaine
