= Prospidium chloride =

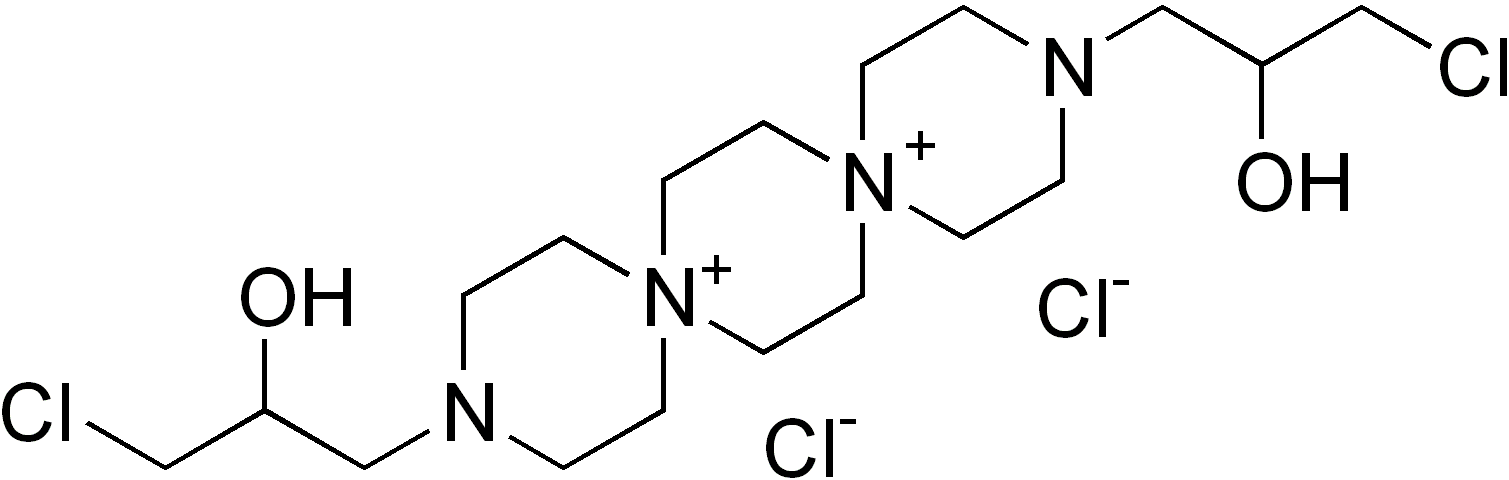

Names
- IUPAC name 1-Chloro-3-[12-(3-chloro-2-hydroxypropyl)-3,12-diaza-6,9-diazoniadispiro[5.2.5^{9}.2^{6}]hexadecan-3-yl]propan-2-ol dichloride
- Other names Prospidine

Identifiers
CAS Number	23476-83-7
3D model (JSmol)	Interactive image
ChEMBL	ChEMBL509176
ChemSpider	29616
PubChem CID	31937
UNII	7G733H6RES
CompTox Dashboard (EPA)	DTXSID301028521
- InChI: InChI=1S/C18H36Cl2N4O2.2ClH/c19-13-17(25)15-21-1-5-23(6-2-21)9-11-24(12-10-23)7-3-22(4-8-24)16-18(26)14-20;;/h17-18,25-26H,1-16H2;2*1H/q+2;;/p-2 Key: QZJPEEOEZVHUAE-UHFFFAOYSA-L
- SMILES: C1C[N+]2(CCN1CC(CCl)O)CC[N+]3(CCN(CC3)CC(CCl)O)CC2.[Cl-].[Cl-]

Properties
Chemical formula	C_{18}H_{36}Cl_{4}N_{4}O_{2}
Molar mass	482.31 g·mol^{−1}
- Except where otherwise noted, data are given for materials in their standard state (at 25 °C [77 °F], 100 kPa). verify (what is ?) Infobox references

Prospidium chloride (prospidine) is a drug with cytostatic (alkylating) and anti-inflammatory properties. It has been studied for the treatment of rheumatoid arthritis.

== See also ==
- Dibrospidium chloride
- List of Russian drugs
