= Corbadrine =

Chemical compound

Clinical data
- Trade names: Neo-Cobefrine
- Other names: Levonordefrin; α-Methylnorepinephrine; (–)-3,4-Dihydroxynorephedrine; 3,4,β-Trihydroxy-α-methylphenethylamine; 3,4,β-Trihydroxyamphetamine
- ATC code: None

Legal status
- Legal status: In general: ℞ (Prescription only)

Identifiers
- IUPAC name: 4-[(1R,2S)-2-amino-1-hydroxypropyl]benzene-1,2-diol
- CAS Number: 829-74-3
- PubChem CID: 164739
- IUPHAR/BPS: 508
- DrugBank: DB06707
- ChemSpider: 144416
- UNII: V008L6478D
- KEGG: D02388
- ChEMBL: ChEMBL677
- CompTox Dashboard (EPA): DTXSID6046349
- ECHA InfoCard: 100.113.606

Chemical and physical data
- Formula: C_{9}H_{13}NO_{3}
- Molar mass: 183.207 g·mol^{−1}
- 3D model (JSmol): Interactive image
- SMILES: Oc1ccc(cc1O)[C@@H](O)[C@@H](N)C
- InChI: InChI=1S/C9H13NO3/c1-5(10)9(13)6-2-3-7(11)8(12)4-6/h2-5,9,11-13H,10H2,1H3/t5-,9-/m0/s1; Key:GEFQWZLICWMTKF-CDUCUWFYSA-N

Corbadrine, sold under the brand name Neo-Cobefrine and also known as levonordefrin and α-methylnorepinephrine, is a catecholamine sympathomimetic used as a topical nasal decongestant and vasoconstrictor in dentistry in the United States. It is usually used in a pre-mixed solution with local anesthetics, such as mepivacaine.

The drug acts as a non-selective agonist of the α_{1}-, α_{2}-, and β-adrenergic receptors. It is said to have preferential activity at the α_{2}-adrenergic receptor.

Corbadrine is also a metabolite of the antihypertensive drug methyldopa and plays a role in its pharmacology and effects.

== Pharmacology ==
=== Pharmacokinetics ===
Corbadrine is metabolized primarily by catechol O-methyltransferase (COMT).

== Chemistry ==
Corbadrine, also known as 3,4,β-trihydroxy-α-methylphenethylamine or as 3,4,β-trihydroxyamphetamine, as well as α-methylnorepinephrine or (–)-3,4-dihydroxynorephedrine, is a substituted phenethylamine and amphetamine derivative.

Analogues of corbadrine include α-methyldopamine, dioxifedrine (3,4-dihydroxyephedrine; α-methylepinephrine), dioxethedrin (3,4-dihydroxy-N-ethylnorephedrine; α-methyl-N-ethylnorepinephrine), and hydroxyamphetamine (4-hydroxyamphetamine; α-methyltyramine).

== Society and culture ==
=== Names ===
Corbadrine is the generic name of the drug and its INN. It is also known as levonordefrin, which is its USAN. Synonyms of corbadrine include α-methylnorepinephrine and (–)-3,4-dihydroxynorephedrine. The drug has been sold under the brand name Neo-Cobefrine.
