= Diamocaine =

Chemical compound

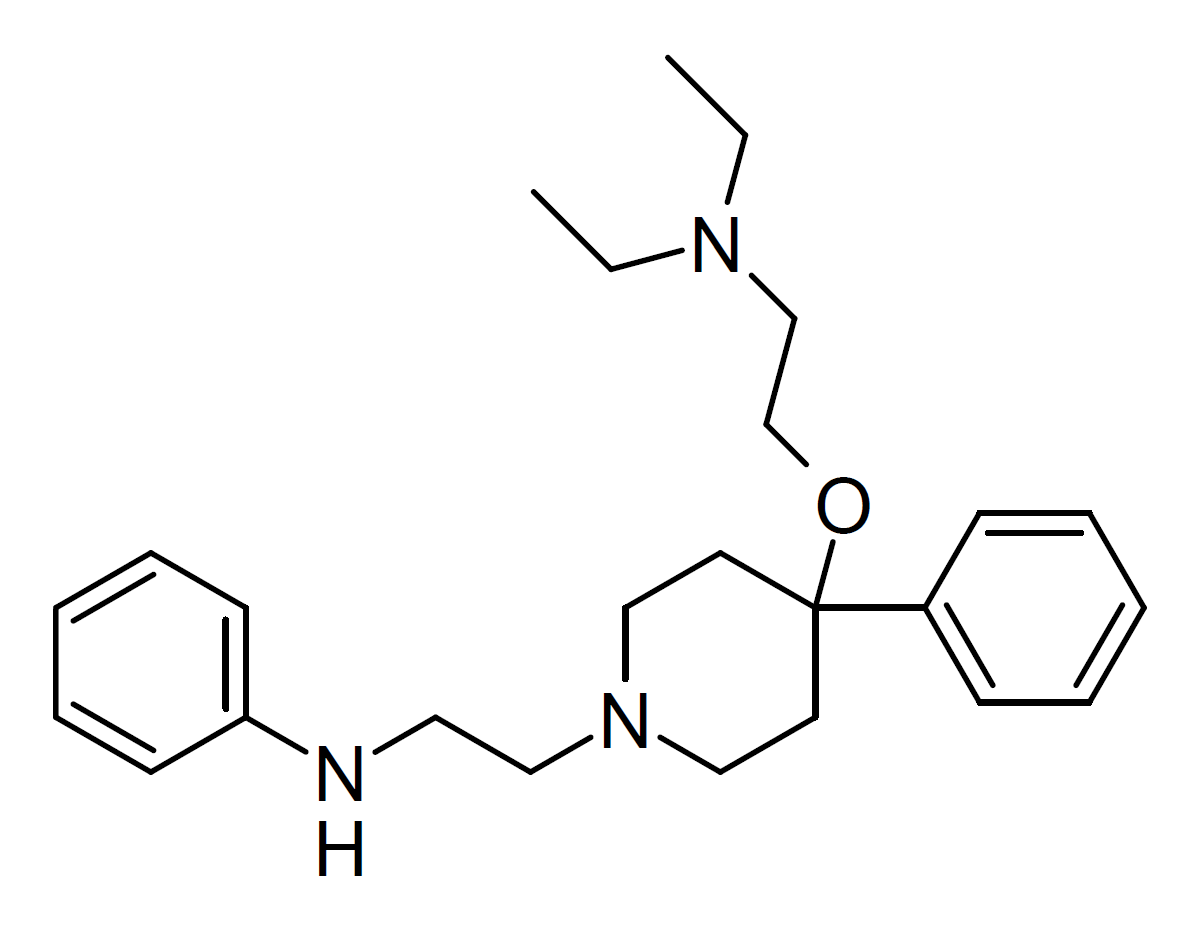

Identifiers
- IUPAC name: N-[2-[4-[2-(diethylamino)ethoxy]-4-phenylpiperidin-1-yl]ethyl]aniline
- CAS Number: 27112-37-4
- PubChem CID: 31932
- ChemSpider: 29611
- UNII: I3I4XCR66J
- ChEMBL: ChEMBL2110911
- CompTox Dashboard (EPA): DTXSID30181573

Chemical and physical data
- Formula: C_{25}H_{37}N_{3}O
- Molar mass: 395.591 g·mol^{−1}
- 3D model (JSmol): Interactive image
- SMILES: CCN(CC)CCOC1(CCN(CC1)CCNC2=CC=CC=C2)C3=CC=CC=C3
- InChI: InChI=1S/C25H37N3O/c1-3-27(4-2)21-22-29-25(23-11-7-5-8-12-23)15-18-28(19-16-25)20-17-26-24-13-9-6-10-14-24/h5-14,26H,3-4,15-22H2,1-2H3; Key:JSELIWGNAHBPAE-UHFFFAOYSA-N

Diamocaine is a local anesthetic that was developed by Janssen Pharmaceuticals in the 1970s. It is a 4-phenylpiperidine derivative, structurally related to opioid drugs such as piminodine and antipsychotics such as haloperidol, but in this series only local anesthetics were produced.

== See also ==
- Dimethocaine
- Procaine
- Tetracaine
