= Etisulergine =

Clinical data
- Other names: CQ-32084; CQ 32-084; N,N-Diethyl-N'-(6-methylergolin-8α-yl)sulfamide
- Drug class: Dopamine agonist; Prolactin inhibitor; Antiparkinsonian agent

Identifiers
- IUPAC name: (6aR,9S,10aR)-9-(diethylsulfamoylamino)-7-methyl-6,6a,8,9,10,10a-hexahydro-4H-indolo[4,3-fg]quinoline
- CAS Number: 64795-23-9
- PubChem CID: 68847
- ChemSpider: 62080
- UNII: 28N73Q6O7Y
- ChEMBL: ChEMBL38992
- CompTox Dashboard (EPA): DTXSID101024323

Chemical and physical data
- Formula: C_{19}H_{28}N_{4}O_{2}S
- Molar mass: 376.52 g·mol^{−1}
- 3D model (JSmol): Interactive image
- SMILES: CCN(CC)S(=O)(=O)N[C@H]1C[C@H]2[C@@H](CC3=CNC4=CC=CC2=C34)N(C1)C
- InChI: InChI=1S/C19H28N4O2S/c1-4-23(5-2)26(24,25)21-14-10-16-15-7-6-8-17-19(15)13(11-20-17)9-18(16)22(3)12-14/h6-8,11,14,16,18,20-21H,4-5,9-10,12H2,1-3H3/t14-,16+,18+/m0/s1; Key:YHEIHLVIKSTGJE-YXJHDRRASA-N

Etisulergine (INN; developmental code name CQ-32084 or CQ 32-084) is a drug of the ergoline family described as a dopamine agonist, prolactin inhibitor, and antiparkinsonian agent which was never marketed. It is closely related in chemical structure to lisuride and is also similar in structure to lysergic acid diethylamide (LSD). Etisulergine was first described in the literature by at least 1977.

== See also ==
- Disulergine
- Mesulergine
- Quinagolide
