= Mesulergine =

Chemical compound

Clinical data
- Other names: CU-32085
- Drug class: Dopamine agonist

Identifiers
- IUPAC name: N'-(1,6-dimethylergolin-8α-yl)-N,N-dimethylsulfamide
- CAS Number: 64795-35-3
- PubChem CID: 68848
- IUPHAR/BPS: 206; [^{3}H]mesulergine: 232
- ChemSpider: 62081
- UNII: SML95FK06I
- ChEBI: CHEBI:73378
- ChEMBL: ChEMBL462903
- CompTox Dashboard (EPA): DTXSID3046324

Chemical and physical data
- Formula: C_{18}H_{26}N_{4}O_{2}S
- Molar mass: 362.49 g·mol^{−1}
- 3D model (JSmol): Interactive image
- SMILES: O=S(=O)(N(C)C)N[C@H]2C[C@@H]3c4cccc1c4c(cn1C)C[C@H]3N(C2)C
- InChI: InChI=1S/C18H26N4O2S/c1-20(2)25(23,24)19-13-9-15-14-6-5-7-16-18(14)12(10-21(16)3)8-17(15)22(4)11-13/h5-7,10,13,15,17,19H,8-9,11H2,1-4H3/t13-,15+,17+/m0/s1; Key:JLVHTNZNKOSCNB-YSVLISHTSA-N

Mesulergine (INN) (developmental code name CU-32085) is a drug of the ergoline group which was never marketed.

== Pharmacology ==
=== Pharmacodynamics ===
Mesulergine activities
Target	Affinity (K_{i}, nM)	Species
5-HT_{1A}	195–398	Human
5-HT_{1B}	631–1,288	Human
5-HT_{1D}	1,700–>10,000	Human
5-HT_{1E}	ND	ND
5-HT_{1F}	>10,000	Human
5-HT_{2A}	19.5–151	Human
5-HT_{2B}	1.44–3.62	Human
5-HT_{2C}	1.12–48.5	Human
5-HT_{3}	>10,000	Rat
5-HT_{4}	ND	ND
5-HT_{5A}	1,000	Rat
5-HT_{5B}	1,000	Rat
5-HT_{6}	776–3,800	Human
5-HT_{7}	7.9–31.6	Human
D_{2}	8–12	Rat
Notes: The smaller the value, the more avidly the drug binds to the site. All proteins are human unless otherwise specified. Refs:

Mesulergine acts on serotonin and dopamine receptors. Specifically, it is an agonist of dopamine D_{2}-like receptors and serotonin 5-HT_{6} receptors and an antagonist of serotonin 5-HT_{2A}, 5-HT_{2B}, 5-HT_{2C}, and 5-HT_{7} receptors. It also has affinity for the 5-HT_{1A}, 5-HT_{1B}, 5-HT_{1D}, 5-HT_{1F}, and 5-HT_{5A} receptors.

== Research ==
Mesulergine had entered clinical trials for the treatment of Parkinson's disease; however, further development was halted due to adverse histological abnormalities in rats. It was also investigated for the treatment of hyperprolactinemia (high prolactin levels).

== See also ==
- Disulergine
- Etisulergine
- Quinagolide
