= Lythranidine =

Names
- Systematic IUPAC name (9S,11R,15R,17S)-23-Methoxy-25-azatetracyclo[18.3.1.12,6.111,15]hexacosa-1(24),2,4,6(26),20,22-hexaene-3,9,17-triol

Identifiers
| CAS Number | 70832-04-1 |
| 3D model (JSmol) | Interactive image |
| Beilstein Reference | 1555440 |
| ChEBI | CHEBI:36284 |
| ChemSpider | 7827710 |
| PubChem CID | 172640 |
| UNII | Y7LYP238KA |
- InChI: InChI=1S/C26H35NO4/c1-31-26-12-8-18-6-10-22(29)16-20-4-2-3-19(27-20)15- 21(28)9-5-17-7-11-25(30)23(13-17)24(26)14-18/h7-8,11-14,19-22,27-30H, 2-6,9-10,15-16H2,1H3
- SMILES: COC1=C2C=C(CCC(CC3CCCC(N3)CC(CCC4=CC2=C(C=C4)O)O)O)C=C1

Properties
| Chemical formula | C_{26}H_{35}NO_{4} |
| Molar mass | 425.569 g·mol^{−1} |
- Except where otherwise noted, data are given for materials in their standard state (at 25 °C [77 °F], 100 kPa). Infobox references

Lythranidine is a piperidine alkaloid that was first isolated from the plant Lythrum anceps. It contains a 17-membered cyclophane ring.

Several laboratory syntheses have been reported.
