= Dimethocaine =

Stimulant

Clinical data
- Other names: DMC, larocaine
- Drug class: Dopamine reuptake inhibitor
- ATC code: none

Legal status
- Legal status: DE: Anlage II (Authorized trade only, not prescriptible); UK: Under Psychoactive Substances Act

Identifiers
- IUPAC name: (3-diethylamino-2,2-dimethylpropyl)-4-aminobenzoate
- CAS Number: 94-15-5 553-63-9 (HCl)
- PubChem CID: 7177
- ChemSpider: 6909
- UNII: R3L4A6GOWZ
- CompTox Dashboard (EPA): DTXSID40240185

Chemical and physical data
- Formula: C_{16}H_{26}N_{2}O_{2}
- Molar mass: 278.396 g·mol^{−1}
- 3D model (JSmol): Interactive image
- Density: 1.0±0.1 g/cm^{3} (predicted)
- Melting point: 48 to 51 °C (118 to 124 °F) (experimental)
- Boiling point: 334 to 403 °C (633 to 757 °F) at 760 mmHg
- SMILES: NC1=CC=C(C(OCC(C)(C)CN(CC)CC)=O)C=C1
- InChI: InChI=1S/C16H26N2O2/c1-5-18(6-2)11-16(3,4)12-20-15(19)13-7-9-14(17)10-8-13/h7-10H,5-6,11-12,17H2,1-4H3; Key:OWQIUQKMMPDHQQ-UHFFFAOYSA-N

Dimethocaine, also known as DMC or larocaine, is a compound with local anesthetic and stimulatory effects. The stimulatory effect resembles that of cocaine, although less potent. Similarly to cocaine, dimethocaine is addictive due to its stimulation of the reward pathway in the brain. However, dimethocaine is a legal cocaine replacement in some countries and is listed by the European Monitoring Centre for Drugs and Drug Addiction (EMCDDA) under the "synthetic cocaine derivatives" category. The structure of dimethocaine, being a 4-aminobenzoic acid ester, resembles that of procaine. It is found as a white powder at room temperature.

When a product sold online in the UK in June 2010, advertised as dimethocaine was tested, it was found to be a mixture of caffeine and lidocaine, and the lack of any dopaminergic stimulant ingredient in such mixes may explain the limited recreational effects reported by many users. Other samples tested have however been shown to contain genuine dimethocaine, and one branded "bath salt" product containing primarily dimethocaine as the active ingredient, was noted to have been particularly subject to abuse by intravenous drug users in Ireland.

== History ==
Dimethocaine was originally synthesized by the Hoffmann-La Roche company in 1930. It was sold under the market name larocaine. During the 1930s dimethocaine gained popularity in the US as a local anesthetic. Just like cocaine and procaine, it was used during surgery, primarily in dentistry, ophthalmology and otolaryngology. However, in the 1940s, it was removed from the market because of its psychoactive effects and risk of addiction. Nowadays dimethocaine is abused for these psychoactive effects. It is sold as a cocaine surrogate to circumvent legislation issues.

== Pharmacology ==
=== Pharmacodynamics ===
Dimethocaine and structurally related local anesthetics such as cocaine and procaine inhibit the uptake of dopamine (DA) by blocking dopamine transporters (DAT). The dopamine transporter controls the dynamics of the neurotransmitter dopamine. This neurotransmitter controls many functions including movement, cognition and mood. Drugs such as cocaine and dimethocaine induce dopamine overflow by inhibiting dopamine transporters and thus creating a euphoric effect. In addition to inhibiting dopamine uptake, dimethocaine was also shown to inhibit the binding of CFT, a different dopamine uptake inhibitor. These inhibitory properties are responsible for the stimulatory effects of dimethocaine on the central nervous system. Both in vivo and in vitro measurements of dopamine transporter activity showed that dimethocaine is a potent and efficacious dopaminergic reuptake inhibitor (also called a dopamine indirect agonist). These effects were mainly observed in the nucleus accumbens, a region in the basal forebrain. Comparison of the pharmacological potencies of different local anesthetics revealed the following potency order:

cocaine > dimethocaine > tetracaine > procaine > chloroprocaine

Furthermore, the administration of dimethocaine has been shown to lead to antinociceptive responses at nontoxic doses in mice. These responses are suggested to be at least partially caused by the effects of dimethocaine on the central nervous system. A memory impairing effect observed in mice after administration of dimethocaine has been proposed to be a result of a non-anesthetic mechanism of action.

=== Pharmacokinetics ===
When inhaled, dimethocaine starts working in 10–30 minutes, with highest effects at 60–120 minutes and until 4–6 hours there is a period of action with the 'after-effects'. The after effects include fatigue and slight mental impairment.

== Metabolism ==
The exact metabolic pathways of dimethocaine have not been researched, but the different metabolites have been examined in Wistar rats. After administration of dimethocaine, different metabolites have been found and identified in their urine. Due to these metabolites, different metabolic pathways could have been postulated. The main phase I reactions are ester hydrolysis, deethylation, hydroxylation of the aromatic system, or a combination of these three. The main phase II reactions are N-acetylation, glucuronidation and a combination of both. Different cytochrome P450 isozymes are involved in the initial steps of human metabolism. The N-acetylation is catalyzed by the NAT2 isozyme.

== Efficacy and side effects ==
Just like cocaine, dimethocaine inhibits the uptake of dopamine in the brain by interfering with the dopamine transporters. The potency of these drugs is linked to their affinity for the dopamine transporters, and their potency to inhibit dopamine uptake.

In studies with rhesus monkeys the affinity of dimethocaine for dopamine transporters is smaller than that of cocaine, whereas dimethocaine's potency to inhibit dopamine uptake is similar. This means that more of dimethocaine is needed to reach a similar response. The peak effects occurred within 10 to 20 minutes after the injection and decreased to baseline levels within an hour.

Dimethocaine is often abused as a legal substitute for cocaine. The drug is administered intravenously or nasally, because ingestion would lead to rapid hydrolyzation. Its positive effects are euphoria, stimulation, increased talkativeness and mood lift. However, because the drug acts similar as cocaine, it has comparable negative side effects. These side effects include: tachycardia, difficulty with breathing, pain on the chest, vasoconstriction, insomnia, paranoia and anxiety. Dimethocaine probably poses larger health issues than cocaine. This is due to the fact that more dimethocaine must be administered to produce the same euphoric feeling, resulting in larger risk for the negative effects.

== Toxicity ==
=== Humans ===
Cocaine and other local anesthetics are known to produce cardiotoxicity by blocking sodium channels. However, no reports have been published of these same effects of cardiotoxicity associated with dimethocaine. There has been little research about toxicity of dimethocaine in humans, and therefore the exact lethal or pharmacological doses are unknown.

=== Animals ===
For mice, the dose at which acute toxicity occurs for intravenous administration is 40 mg/kg and for subcutaneous injection (injection in the layer of skin directly below the dermis and epidermis) this is 380 mg/kg. The lethal dose of dimethocaine for a mouse is 0.3 g per kilogram body weight.

An abdominal constriction test was performed in mice, using doses of 5, 10, and 20 mg/kg of dimethocaine which were administered subcutaneously. This test showed induced dose-dependent antinociceptive responses, which are processes that block detection of a painful or injurious stimulus by sensory neurons.

Impairment of memory processes was found to be a toxic effect in the elevated plus-maze test in mice.

== Legal status ==
Sweden's public health agency suggested classifying Dimethocaine as a hazardous substance, on September 25, 2019.

== See also ==
- 3-(p-Fluorobenzoyloxy)tropane
- McN-5908
- Nitracaine
- N,N-Dipropyldimethocaine
- List of cocaine analogues
