= Quinagolide =

Chemical compound

Clinical data
- Trade names: Norprolac
- AHFS/Drugs.com: International Drug Names
- Routes of administration: Oral
- Drug class: Dopamine receptor agonist
- ATC code: G02CB04 (WHO)

Legal status
- Legal status: In general: ℞ (Prescription only)

Identifiers
- IUPAC name: N,N-diethyl-N-[(3S,4aS,10aR)-6-hydroxy-1-propyl-1,2,3,4,4a,5,10,10a-octahydrobenzo[g]quinolin-3-yl]sulfamide
- CAS Number: 87056-78-8
- PubChem CID: 55645
- DrugBank: DB09097
- ChemSpider: 2343034
- UNII: 80Q9QWN15M
- KEGG: D07217
- ChEMBL: ChEMBL290962

Chemical and physical data
- Formula: C_{20}H_{33}N_{3}O_{3}S
- Molar mass: 395.56 g·mol^{−1}
- InChI: InChI=1S/C20H33N3O3S/c1-4-10-22-14-17(21-27(25,26)23(5-2)6-3)11-16-12-18-15(13-19(16)22)8-7-9-20(18)24/h7-9,16-17,19,21,24H,4-6,10-14H2,1-3H3/t16-,17+,19-/m1/s1; Key:GDFGTRDCCWFXTG-ZIFCJYIRSA-N

Quinagolide (INN, BAN), sold under the brand name Norprolac, is a selective dopamine D_{2} receptor agonist which is used to manage hyperprolactinemia. It has also been found to be effective in the treatment of breast pain. It is used in the UK, but it is not available in US.

== Chemistry ==
Quinagolide is a racemate composed of the following two enantiomers:

Enantiomeres of Quinagolide
(+)-Quinagolid; CAS number: 140630-79-1	(-)-Quinagolid; CAS number: 140630-80-4

=== Synthesis ===
The first synthesis of quinagolide was disclosed in patents filed by Sandoz.

A sequence of nine steps is required to transform the starting material 5-methoxy-2-tetralone (1) into the octahydrobenzo[g]quinoline ring system with the correct stereochemistry required. This intermediate (11) is then converted in another five steps to the drug. Transformation of the ester (13) into the amine (15) is accomplished by a Curtius rearrangement in which an acyl hydrazide is treated with nitrosyl chloride.

=== Manufacture ===
The laboratory route was not practical for the synthesis of quinagoline on a large scale. Therefore scientists at Novartis developed an improved process.

The starting material is 1,6-dimethoxynaphthalene (1). This is selectively lithiated at the C-7 position and reacts with (2Z)-ethyl 2-cyano-3-ethoxyacrylate (2), to give the cyanoacrylate (3). Catalytic hydrogenation and hydrolysis produces (5). Birch reduction of (5) leads first to (6) which on acid work-up gives the imine (7), which is reduced with sodium borohydride to yield (8). Fischer esterification with methanol gives an ester that is next alkylated with 1-iodopropane to give (11). The required stereochemistry for quinagoline is set in the final steps.

== See also ==
- Quinpirole
- Quinelorane
- Disulergine
- Etisulergine
- Mesulergine
