= Disulergine =

Clinical data
- Other names: CH-29717; CH 29-717; Sulergine; N,N-Dimethyl-N'-(6-methylergoline-8α-yl)sulfamide
- Drug class: Dopamine agonist; Prolactin inhibitor

Identifiers
- IUPAC name: (6aR,9S,10aR)-9-(dimethylsulfamoylamino)-7-methyl-6,6a,8,9,10,10a-hexahydro-4H-indolo[4,3-fg]quinoline
- CAS Number: 59032-40-5
- PubChem CID: 68788
- ChemSpider: 62028
- UNII: 1Q3CYC1YR6
- ChEMBL: ChEMBL95067
- CompTox Dashboard (EPA): DTXSID701024214

Chemical and physical data
- Formula: C_{17}H_{24}N_{4}O_{2}S
- Molar mass: 348.47 g·mol^{−1}
- 3D model (JSmol): Interactive image
- SMILES: CN1C[C@H](C[C@H]2[C@H]1CC3=CNC4=CC=CC2=C34)NS(=O)(=O)N(C)C
- InChI: InChI=1S/C17H24N4O2S/c1-20(2)24(22,23)19-12-8-14-13-5-4-6-15-17(13)11(9-18-15)7-16(14)21(3)10-12/h4-6,9,12,14,16,18-19H,7-8,10H2,1-3H3/t12-,14+,16+/m0/s1; Key:VUEGYUOUAAVYAS-JGGQBBKZSA-N

Disulergine (INN; developmental code names CH-29717 or CH 29-717) is a dopamine agonist of the ergoline family described as a prolactin inhibitor which was never marketed. It is known to be a metabolite of mesulergine. The drug was first described in the literature by 1976.

== See also ==
- Etisulergine
- Quinagolide
- Lisuride
