= Ditophal =

Chemical compound

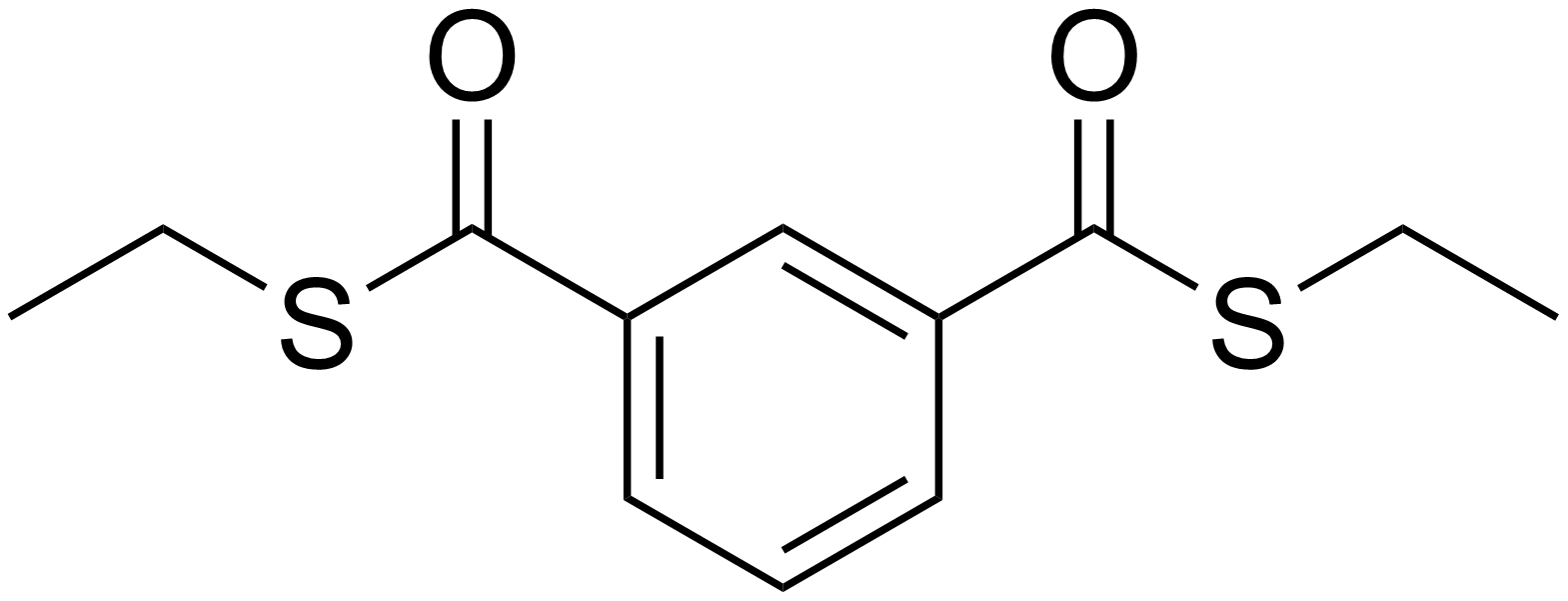

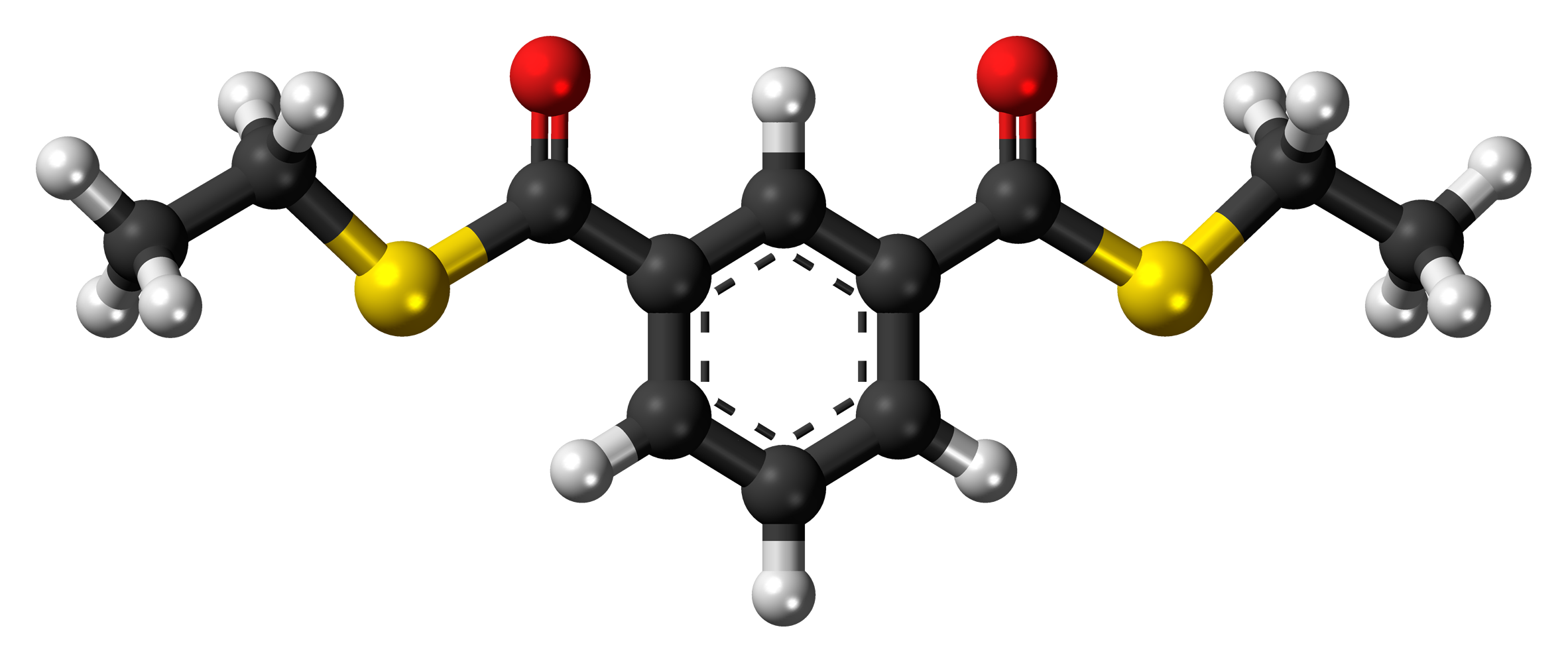

Clinical data
- Other names: Etusil; 1,3-Dithioisophthalic acid, diethyl ester

Identifiers
- IUPAC name: 1-S,3-S-diethyl benzene-1,3-dicarbothioate
- CAS Number: 584-69-0
- PubChem CID: 3083635
- ChemSpider: 2340808
- UNII: 40SR2754GL
- CompTox Dashboard (EPA): DTXSID40207112

Chemical and physical data
- Formula: C_{12}H_{14}O_{2}S_{2}
- Molar mass: 254.36 g·mol^{−1}
- 3D model (JSmol): Interactive image
- SMILES: CCSC(=O)C1=CC(=CC=C1)C(=O)SCC
- InChI: InChI=1S/C12H14O2S2/c1-3-15-11(13)9-6-5-7-10(8-9)12(14)16-4-2/h5-8H,3-4H2,1-2H3; Key:DWGXUDUOJPYAOR-UHFFFAOYSA-N

Ditophal is an antileprotic drug which is no longer marketed.

The compound is diethyl dithiolisophthalate, the ethyl ester of a thiocarboxylic acid.
