= GDI Integrated Facility Services =

Canadian company

- Type: Public
- Traded as: TSX: GDI
- Industry: janitorial services
- Headquarters: Montreal, Quebec, Canada
- Area served: North America
- Key people: Claude Bigras (President and CEO); Stéphane Lavigne(CFO)
- Revenue: 873.1 million (2016)
- Net income: 14.6 million (2016)
- Number of employees: 20,000
- Subsidiaries: Ainsworth Inc
- Website: gdi.com

GDI is a commercial facility services provider offering a range of services in Canada and the United States to owners and managers of a variety of facility types including office buildings, hotels, shopping centres, industrial facilities, healthcare establishments, distribution facilities, airports and other transportation facilities.

GDI's commercial facility services capabilities include commercial janitorial, installation, maintenance and repair of HVAC-R, mechanical and electrical systems, as well as other complementary services such as damage restoration and janitorial products manufacturing and distribution.

== History ==
The company was founded in 1926 under the name Robertson Janitorial Ltd. In 1987, the company was sold to Jean-Louis Couturier and renamed Distinction Maintenance Service Inc. In 1989 he changed the company's name to Groupe Distinction Inc. so it could operate in both English- and French-speaking markets. In 1992, Groupe Distinction Inc. (now known as GDI) purchased Prestige Maintenance Company Inc. and Conciergerie Vertu.

On August 29, 2007, GDI entered into an arrangement agreement with Dacha Capital Inc. and 9184-0561 Québec Inc., a wholly owned subsidiary of Dacha. The agreement took effect on November 12, 2007, resulting in the formation of Distinction Group Inc. That same year, GDI was listed as a public company on the Toronto Stock Exchange.

On Dec. 21, 2007, under the leadership of Claude Bigras, President & CEO, GDI announced that it purchased all outstanding shares of Omni Facility Services Canada Limited, creating a leading North American building services provider with a network of 17 fully staffed offices in Canada and 8000 employees.

In 2011, private equity fund and majority GDI owner Birch Hill Equity Partners IV, L.P. formed Clean Holdings in order to acquire a majority of GDI and privatize the company. The privatization was completed in 2012.

In May 2015, GDI returned to the public markets through a reverse merger with investment and advisory firm Medwell Capital Corp.

On July 24, 2015, GDI announced an agreement to acquire Ainsworth Inc., a Canadian company providing mechanical maintenance, HVACR, electrical, data transport cabling, and high-voltage services through 750 employees and 12 locations. The acquisition closed on November 12, 2015.

On November 2, 2016, GDI announced an agreement to acquire Direct Energy Business Services Limited, doing business under Airtron Canada. Airtron specializes in HVAC, building automation, and energy efficiency services. The acquisition enables GDI to provide remote facility monitoring, energy consumption management, equipment diagnostics and problem resolution, and real-time system performance data analytics.
