= Hydroxycarteolol =

Chemical compound

Clinical data
- Other names: 8-Hydroxycarteolol
- ATC code: None

Identifiers
- IUPAC name: 8-Hydroxy-5-{2-hydroxy-3-[(2-methyl-2-propanyl)amino]propoxy}-3,4-dihydro-2(1H)-quinolinone
- CAS Number: 59826-22-1
- PubChem CID: 124688
- ChemSpider: 111020
- ChEBI: CHEBI:192312
- CompTox Dashboard (EPA): DTXSID50975219

Chemical and physical data
- Formula: C_{16}H_{24}N_{2}O_{4}
- Molar mass: 308.378 g·mol^{−1}
- 3D model (JSmol): Interactive image
- SMILES: O=C2Nc1c(O)ccc(OCC(O)CNC(C)(C)C)c1CC2
- InChI: InChI=1S/C16H24N2O4/c1-16(2,3)17-8-10(19)9-22-13-6-5-12(20)15-11(13)4-7-14(21)18-15/h5-6,10,17,19-20H,4,7-9H2,1-3H3,(H,18,21); Key:TVZJLAKRXHGVOK-UHFFFAOYSA-N

Hydroxycarteolol is a beta blocker and metabolite of carteolol.
