= Ciladopa =

Chemical compound

Clinical data
- Other names: AY-27,110
- Routes of administration: Oral
- ATC code: none

Legal status
- Legal status: In general: uncontrolled

Identifiers
- IUPAC name: 2-{4-[(2S)-2-(3,4-dimethoxyphenyl)-2-hydroxyethyl]piperazin-1-yl}cyclohepta-2,4,6-trien-1-one
- CAS Number: 80109-27-9
- PubChem CID: 133371
- ChemSpider: 117659
- UNII: D09L486R3J
- ChEMBL: ChEMBL2110793
- CompTox Dashboard (EPA): DTXSID101024642

Chemical and physical data
- Formula: C_{21}H_{26}N_{2}O_{4}
- Molar mass: 370.449 g·mol^{−1}
- 3D model (JSmol): Interactive image
- SMILES: O=C3/C=C\C=C/C=C3/N2CCN(C[C@@H](O)c1ccc(OC)c(OC)c1)CC2

Ciladopa (developmental code name AY-27,110) is a dopamine agonist with a similar chemical structure to dopamine. It was under investigation as an antiparkinsonian agent but was discontinued due to concerns of tumorogenesis in rodents.
