= Dimethazan =

Chemical compound

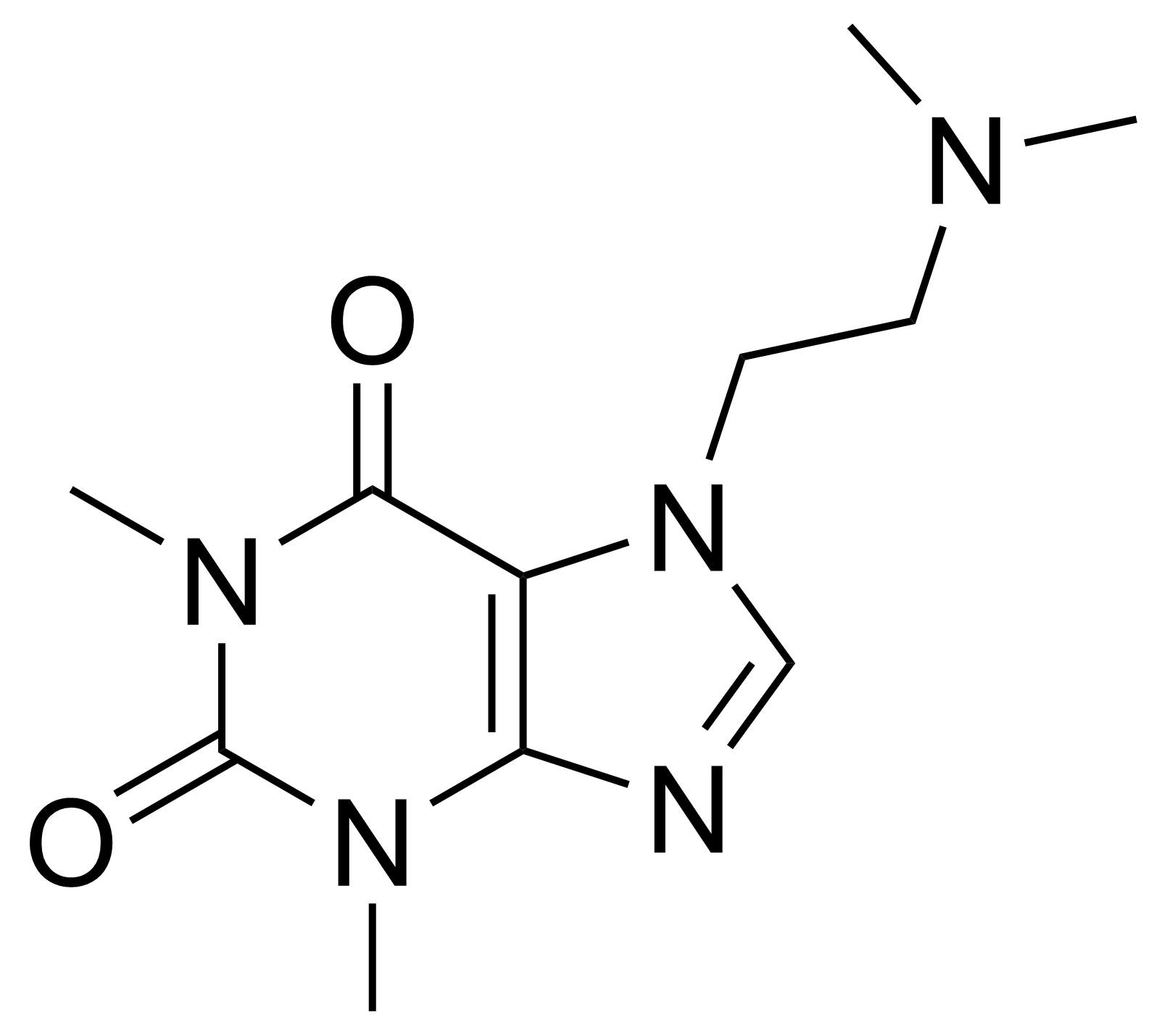

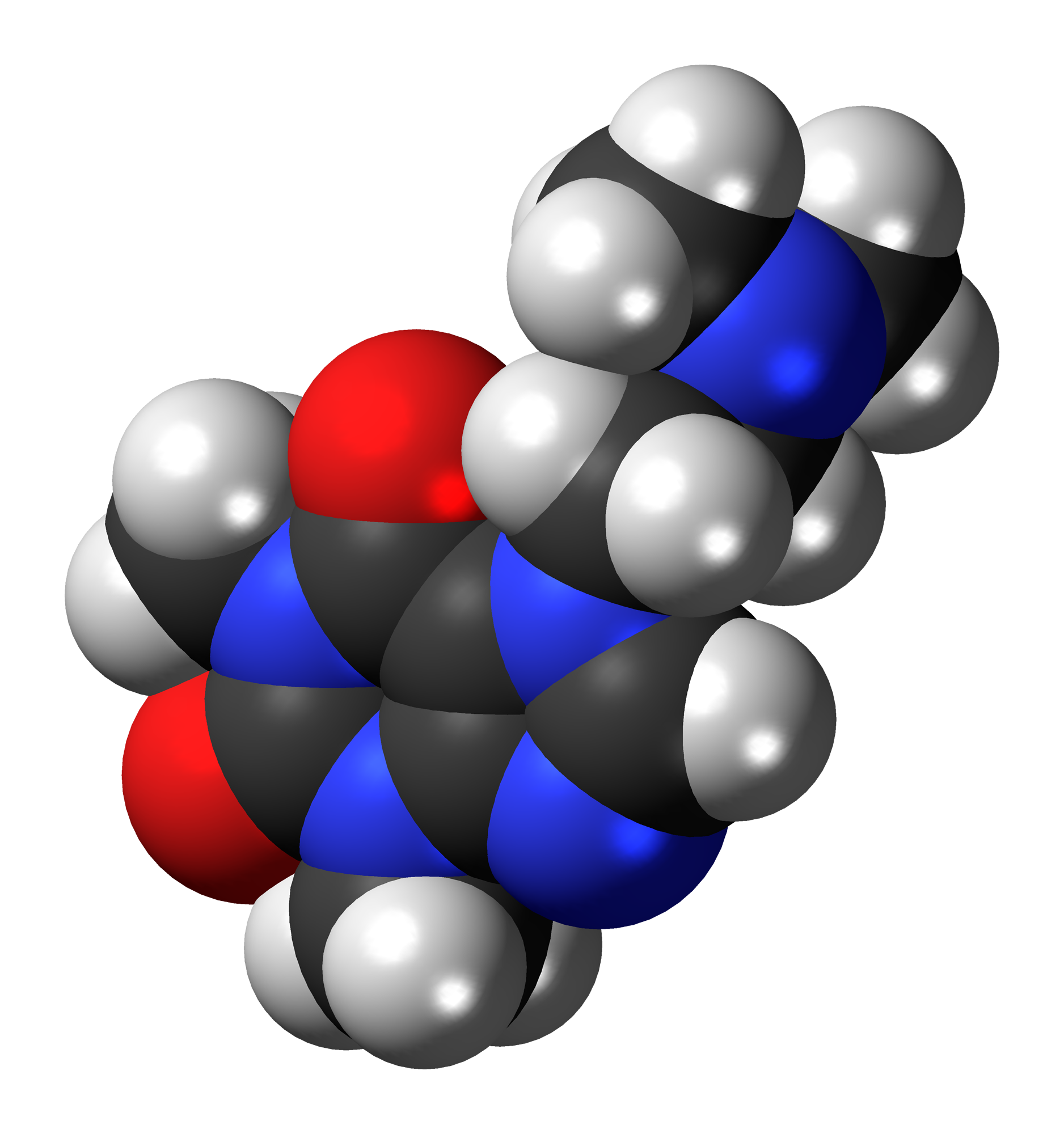

Clinical data
- Other names: 1,3-dimethyl-7-(2-dimethylaminoethyl)xanthine; 7-(2-dimethylaminoethyl)theophylline
- Routes of administration: Oral
- ATC code: none

Legal status
- Legal status: In general: ℞ (Prescription only)

Identifiers
- IUPAC name: 7-(2-dimethylaminoethyl)-1,3-dimethyl-purine-2,6-dione
- CAS Number: 519-30-2
- PubChem CID: 10612
- ChemSpider: 10167
- UNII: H943V308AD
- CompTox Dashboard (EPA): DTXSID10199858
- ECHA InfoCard: 100.007.516

Chemical and physical data
- Formula: C_{11}H_{17}N_{5}O_{2}
- Molar mass: 251.290 g·mol^{−1}
- 3D model (JSmol): Interactive image
- SMILES: O=C2N(c1ncn(c1C(=O)N2C)CCN(C)C)C

Dimethazan (Elidin) is a stimulant drug of the xanthine class related to caffeine and theophylline. It also has tranquilizing and respiratory-stimulating effects and has been sold as an antidepressant.

== See also ==
- Xanthine
