= Dichlorisone =

Chemical compound

Clinical data
- Other names: 9,11β-Dichloro-17α,21-dihydroxypregna-1,4-diene-3,20-dione
- Drug class: Corticosteroid; Glucocorticoid

Identifiers
- IUPAC name: (8S,9R,10S,11S,13S,14S,17R)-9,11-Dichloro-17-hydroxy-17-(2-hydroxyacetyl)-10,13-dimethyl-6,7,8,11,12,14,15,16-octahydrocyclopenta[a]phenanthren-3-one
- CAS Number: 7008-26-6
- PubChem CID: 20054892
- ChemSpider: 16735776
- UNII: AMW2MRV3OT
- KEGG: D07814
- CompTox Dashboard (EPA): DTXSID10220353
- ECHA InfoCard: 100.027.531

Chemical and physical data
- Formula: C_{21}H_{26}Cl_{2}O_{4}
- Molar mass: 413.34 g·mol^{−1}
- 3D model (JSmol): Interactive image
- SMILES: C[C@]12C[C@@H]([C@]3([C@H]([C@@H]1CC[C@@]2(C(=O)CO)O)CCC4=CC(=O)C=C[C@@]43C)Cl)Cl
- InChI: InChI=1S/C21H26Cl2O4/c1-18-7-5-13(25)9-12(18)3-4-15-14-6-8-20(27,17(26)11-24)19(14,2)10-16(22)21(15,18)23/h5,7,9,14-16,24,27H,3-4,6,8,10-11H2,1-2H3/t14-,15-,16-,18-,19-,20-,21-/m0/s1; Key:CZJXBZPJABCCRQ-BULBTXNYSA-N

Dichlorisone is a synthetic glucocorticoid corticosteroid which was never marketed.
