= Dimesone =

Chemical compound

Clinical data
- Other names: 9α-Fluoro-11β,21-dihydroxy-16α,17α-dimethylpregna-1,4-diene-3,20-dione
- Drug class: Corticosteroid; Glucocorticoid

Identifiers
- IUPAC name: (8S,9R,10S,11S,13S,14S,16R,17S)-9-Fluoro-11-hydroxy-17-(2-hydroxyacetyl)-10,13,16,17-tetramethyl-6,7,8,11,12,14,15,16-octahydrocyclopenta[a]phenanthren-3-one
- CAS Number: 25092-07-3
- PubChem CID: 208841
- ChemSpider: 180949
- UNII: B506X74MK0
- ChEMBL: ChEMBL2106346
- CompTox Dashboard (EPA): DTXSID201043249

Chemical and physical data
- Formula: C_{23}H_{31}FO_{4}
- Molar mass: 390.495 g·mol^{−1}
- 3D model (JSmol): Interactive image
- SMILES: C[C@@H]1C[C@H]2[C@@H]3CCC4=CC(=O)C=C[C@@]4([C@]3([C@H](C[C@@]2([C@@]1(C)C(=O)CO)C)O)F)C
- InChI: InChI=1S/C23H31FO4/c1-13-9-17-16-6-5-14-10-15(26)7-8-20(14,2)23(16,24)18(27)11-21(17,3)22(13,4)19(28)12-25/h7-8,10,13,16-18,25,27H,5-6,9,11-12H2,1-4H3/t13-,16+,17+,18+,20+,21+,22-,23+/m1/s1; Key:FXBVINCSIJOIGL-ODTHGOCZSA-N

Dimesone is a synthetic glucocorticoid corticosteroid.
