= Dioxethedrin =

Sympathomimetic drug

Clinical data
- Other names: Dioxethedrine; 3,4-Dihydroxy-N-ethylnorephedrine; 3,4,β-Trihydroxy-N-ethyl-α-methyl-β-phenethylamine; 3,4,β-Trihydroxy-N-ethylamphetamine; α-Methyl-N-ethylnorepinephrine

Identifiers
- IUPAC name: 4-[2-(ethylamino)-1-hydroxypropyl]benzene-1,2-diol
- CAS Number: 497-75-6
- PubChem CID: 71632
- ChemSpider: 64697
- UNII: 82J92E653W
- ChEBI: CHEBI:134881
- ChEMBL: ChEMBL2110629
- CompTox Dashboard (EPA): DTXSID00862044
- ECHA InfoCard: 100.007.137

Chemical and physical data
- Formula: C_{11}H_{17}NO_{3}
- Molar mass: 211.261 g·mol^{−1}
- 3D model (JSmol): Interactive image
- SMILES: CCNC(C)C(C1=CC(=C(C=C1)O)O)O
- InChI: InChI=1S/C11H17NO3/c1-3-12-7(2)11(15)8-4-5-9(13)10(14)6-8/h4-7,11-15H,3H2,1-2H3; Key:OHDICGSRVLBVLC-UHFFFAOYSA-N

Dioxethedrin (INN), or dioxethedrine, also known as 3,4-dihydroxy-N-ethylnorephedrine, is a sympathomimetic medication. It was a component of the antitussive syrup Bexol (a combination of dioxethedrin, codeine, and promethazine). It is an ephedrine derivative (and hence is a phenethylamine and amphetamine) and is described as a bronchodilator and β-adrenergic receptor agonist. Analogues of dioxethedrin include dioxifedrine (α-methylepinephrine; 3,4-dihydroxyephedrine), corbadrine (levonordefrin; α-methylnorepinephrine), and α-methyldopamine.
