= Dibrospidium chloride =

Cancer drug being studied

Dibrospidium chloride INN: Dibrospidium chloride

Clinical data
- Other names: Spirobromin, spirobromine
- ATC code: L01

Identifiers
- IUPAC name: 3,12-Bis(3-bromopropanoyl)-3,6,9,12-tetraazadispiro[5.2.5~9~.2~6~]hexadecane-6,9-diium dichloride
- CAS Number: 86641-76-1
- PubChem CID: 72114
- ChemSpider: 65092
- UNII: GRX5L9Y3Z3
- ChEMBL: ChEMBL2106677
- CompTox Dashboard (EPA): DTXSID101006989

Chemical and physical data
- Formula: C18-H32-Br2-N4-O2.2Cl
- Molar mass: 567.191
- 3D model (JSmol): Interactive image
- SMILES: [Cl-].[Cl-].BrCCC(=O)N1CC[N+]2(CC1)CC[N+]3(CCN(CC3)C(=O)CCBr)CC2
- InChI: InChI=InChI=1S/C18H32Br2N4O2.2ClH/c19-3-1-17(25)21-5-9-23(10-6-21)13-15-24(16-14-23)11-7-22(8-12-24)18(26)2-4-20;;/h1-16H2;2*1H/q+2;;/p-2; Key:CURYRIVJTBNEGU-UHFFFAOYSA-L

Dibrospidium chloride, also known as spirobromin, is a drug being investigated to treat bone cancer. It has potential anti-inflammatory and anti-neoplastic properties. It is an alkylating antineoplastic agent.

Dibrospidium chloride and related compounds were developed in Russia in the 1980s. It is currently used in Russia as a cytostatic antitumor chemotherapeutic drug.

== See also ==
- Prospidium chloride
