= Quinpirole =

Names
- Preferred IUPAC name (4aR,8aR)-5-Propyl-4,4a,5,6,7,8,8a,9-octahydro-1H-pyrazolo[3,4-g]quinoline
- Other names LY-171555; LY171555; LY-171,555

Identifiers
CAS Number	80373-22-4
3D model (JSmol)	Interactive image
ChEBI	CHEBI:75401
ChEMBL	ChEMBL240773
ChemSpider	49279
IUPHAR/BPS	2
MeSH	D019257
PubChem CID	54562
UNII	20OP60125T
CompTox Dashboard (EPA)	DTXSID9048229
- InChI: InChI=1S/C13H21N3/c1-2-5-16-6-3-4-10-7-12-11(8-13(10)16)9-14-15-12/h9-10,13H,2-8H2,1H3,(H,14,15)/t10-,13-/m1/s1 Key: FTSUPYGMFAPCFZ-ZWNOBZJWSA-N; InChI=1/C13H21N3/c1-2-5-16-6-3-4-10-7-12-11(8-13(10)16)9-14-15-12/h9-10,13H,2-8H2,1H3,(H,14,15)/t10-,13-/m1/s1 Key: FTSUPYGMFAPCFZ-ZWNOBZJWBQ
- SMILES: CCCN1CCC[C@H]2[C@H]1CC3=C(C2)NN=C3

Properties
Chemical formula	C_{13}H_{21}N_{3}
Molar mass	219.33 g/mol
- Except where otherwise noted, data are given for materials in their standard state (at 25 °C [77 °F], 100 kPa). verify (what is ?) Infobox references

Quinpirole (developmental code name LY-171555) is a psychoactive drug and research chemical which acts as a selective D_{2} and D_{3} receptor agonist. It is used in scientific research. Quinpirole has been shown to increase locomotion and sniffing behavior in mice treated with it. At least one study has found that quinpirole induces compulsive behavior symptomatic of obsessive–compulsive disorder in rats. Another study in rats show that quinpirole produces significant THC-like effects when metabolic degradation of anandamide is inhibited, supporting the hypothesis that these effects of quinpirole are mediated by cannabinoid CB_{1} receptors. Quinpirole may also reduce relapse in adolescent rat models of cocaine addiction.

Experiments in flies found quinpirole may have neuroprotective effects against Parkinson's disease-like pathology. Moreover, in primary neuronal cultures it also reduces the rate of firing in dopaminergic neurons.

Another study involving mice that had their N-ethylmaleimide-sensitive factor deleted found that the mice exhibited ADHD behaviors and that administering quinpirole alleviated the behaviors. This opens the door to a potential new avenue of ADHD treatment.

Quinpirole is the active and levorotatory enantiomer of LY-141865.

== See also ==
- Quinelorane
- Quinagolide
- Debenzergoline
