= Scholarine =

Names
- IUPAC name Methyl (19S)-19-hydroxy-12-methoxy-2,16-didehydrocuran-17-oate
- Systematic IUPAC name Methyl (3aS,5S,11bR,12S)-12-[(1S)-1-hydroxyethyl]-8-methoxy-1,2,3a,4,5,7-hexahydro-3,5-ethanopyrrolo[2,3-d]carbazole-6-carboxylate
- Other names 12-Methoxyechitamidine

Identifiers
CAS Number	78897-55-9
3D model (JSmol)	Interactive image
ChEBI	CHEBI:70501
ChEMBL	ChEMBL523826
ChemSpider	10202305
PubChem CID	21586664
CompTox Dashboard (EPA)	DTXSID701045507
- InChI: InChI=1S/C21H26N2O4/c1-11(24)13-10-23-8-7-21-14-5-4-6-15(26-2)18(14)22-19(21)17(20(25)27-3)12(13)9-16(21)23/h4-6,11-13,16,22,24H,7-10H2,1-3H3/t11-,12-,13-,16-,21+/m0/s1 Key: FNDWOLJMJUSGOB-CSXNJMRASA-N
- SMILES: C[C@@H]([C@@H]1CN2CC[C@@]34[C@@H]2C[C@@H]1C(=C3Nc5c4cccc5OC)C(=O)OC)O

Properties
Chemical formula	C_{21}H_{26}N_{2}O_{4}
Molar mass	370.449 g·mol^{−1}
- Except where otherwise noted, data are given for materials in their standard state (at 25 °C [77 °F], 100 kPa). Infobox references

Scholarine is an alkaloid isolated initially from Alstonia scholaris by Banerji and Siddhanta. Subsequently, it was obtained from the West African tree Alstonia boonei. The derivative N-Formylscholarine has been isolated from the fruit pods of Alstonia scholaris.

Chemical structure of N-formylscholarine

== See also ==
- Scholaricine
