= Diproteverine =

Chemical compound

Clinical data
- ATC code: none

Identifiers
- IUPAC name: 1-[(3,4-diethoxyphenyl)methyl]-6,7-dipropan-2- yloxy-3,4-dihydroisoquinoline
- CAS Number: 69373-95-1 69373-88-2 (hydrochloride)
- PubChem CID: 50463
- ChemSpider: 45755
- UNII: 8A5OIA91GT
- CompTox Dashboard (EPA): DTXSID10219464

Chemical and physical data
- Formula: C_{26}H_{35}NO_{4}
- Molar mass: 425.569 g·mol^{−1}
- 3D model (JSmol): Interactive image
- SMILES: O(c1ccc(cc1OCC)CC/2=N/CCc3cc(OC(C)C)c(OC(C)C)cc\23)CC
- InChI: InChI=1S/C26H35NO4/c1-7-28-23-10-9-19(14-24(23)29-8-2)13-22-21-16-26(31-18(5)6)25(30-17(3)4)15-20(21)11-12-27-22/h9-10,14-18H,7-8,11-13H2,1-6H3; Key:APMMVXSVJLZZRR-UHFFFAOYSA-N

Diproteverine (usually as diproteverine hydrochloride) is a calcium channel blocker.
