= Dioxifedrine =

Sympathomimetic that was never marketed

Clinical data
- Other names: Dioxifedrin; α-Methylepinephrine; α-Methyladrenaline; 3,4-Dihydroxyephedrine; Dioxyephedrine; Sor-N 49; Diphedran; LD-1205; 3,4,β-Trihydroxy-α,N-dimethylphenethylamine; 3,4,β-Trihydroxy-N-methylamphetamine

Identifiers
- IUPAC name: 4-[1-hydroxy-2-(methylamino)propyl]benzene-1,2-diol
- CAS Number: 10329-60-9
- PubChem CID: 13683
- ChemSpider: 13093
- UNII: CF48QOH154
- ChEMBL: ChEMBL416557
- CompTox Dashboard (EPA): DTXSID40864249
- ECHA InfoCard: 100.030.639

Chemical and physical data
- Formula: C_{10}H_{15}NO_{3}
- Molar mass: 197.234 g·mol^{−1}
- 3D model (JSmol): Interactive image
- SMILES: CC(C(C1=CC(=C(C=C1)O)O)O)NC
- InChI: InChI=1S/C10H15NO3/c1-6(11-2)10(14)7-3-4-8(12)9(13)5-7/h3-6,10-14H,1-2H3; Key:DDBFLXGTCAVAFD-UHFFFAOYSA-N

Dioxifedrine (INN), or dioxifedrin, also known as α-methylepinephrine or as 3,4-dihydroxyephedrine, is a sympathomimetic medication that was never marketed. It is described as a β-adrenergic receptor agonist and bronchodilator. The drug is a substituted phenethylamine and amphetamine and is the catecholamine (3,4-dihydroxylated) derivative of ephedrine and the amphetamine (α-methylated) analogue of epinephrine (adrenaline). Analogues of dioxifedrine include dioxethedrin (α-methyl-N-ethylnorepinephrine), corbadrine (levonordefrin; α-methylnorepinephrine), and α-methyldopamine.
