= Nitracaine =

Chemical compound

Legal status
- Legal status: UK: Under Psychoactive Substances Act

Identifiers
- IUPAC name: (3-Diethylamino-2,2-dimethylpropyl)-4-nitrobenzoate
- CAS Number: 1648893-21-3
- PubChem CID: 91936940
- ChemSpider: 29341792
- UNII: B8ZB08WI9O
- CompTox Dashboard (EPA): DTXSID301031590

Chemical and physical data
- Formula: C_{16}H_{24}N_{2}O_{4}
- Molar mass: 308.378 g·mol^{−1}
- 3D model (JSmol): Interactive image
- SMILES: CCN(CC)CC(C)(C)COC(=O)C1=CC=C(C=C1)[N+](=O)[O-]
- InChI: InChI=1S/C16H24N2O4/c1-5-17(6-2)11-16(3,4)12-22-15(19)13-7-9-14(10-8-13)18(20)21/h7-10H,5-6,11-12H2,1-4H3; Key:SPTIETJWCCCJSE-UHFFFAOYSA-N

Nitracaine is a synthetic compound classified as a local anesthetic with stimulant properties. It falls into the class of drugs known as local anesthetics. It is closely related to dimethocaine. Nitracaine shares some similarities in effects with cocaine, but has its own distinct pharmacological profile.

The chemical structure of nitracaine consists of a benzoic acid ester with a para-substituted phenyl ring. It is formally known as 3-(diethylamino)-2,2-dimethylpropyl 4-nitrobenzoate. The presence of the nitro group (NO_{2}) in its molecular structure contributes to its anesthetic properties.

== Legal status ==
Sweden's public health agency suggested classifying nitracaine as a hazardous substance, on September 25, 2019.

== See also ==
- 3-(p-Fluorobenzoyloxy)tropane
