= Diacetolol =

Chemical compound

Clinical data
- Routes of administration: Oral
- ATC code: none

Legal status
- Legal status: In general: ℞ (Prescription only)

Pharmacokinetic data
- Elimination half-life: 8-13 hours

Identifiers
- IUPAC name: N-[3-acetyl-4-[2-hydroxy-3-(isopropylamino)propoxy]phenyl]acetamide
- CAS Number: 22568-64-5
- PubChem CID: 50894
- ChemSpider: 46139
- UNII: 4ER0CZ5G7C
- ChEMBL: ChEMBL2106189
- CompTox Dashboard (EPA): DTXSID70865421
- ECHA InfoCard: 100.040.974

Chemical and physical data
- Formula: C_{16}H_{24}N_{2}O_{4}
- Molar mass: 308.378 g·mol^{−1}
- 3D model (JSmol): Interactive image
- SMILES: O=C(Nc1ccc(OCC(O)CNC(C)C)c(c1)C(=O)C)C
- InChI: InChI=1S/C16H24N2O4/c1-10(2)17-8-14(21)9-22-16-6-5-13(18-12(4)20)7-15(16)11(3)19/h5-7,10,14,17,21H,8-9H2,1-4H3,(H,18,20); Key:AWOGXJOBNAWQSF-UHFFFAOYSA-N

Diacetolol is the primary metabolite of acebutolol. It is a beta blocker and anti-arrhythmic agent.
