= Diprafenone =

Names
- IUPAC name 1-[2-[2-Hydroxy-3-(2-methylbutan-2-ylamino)propoxy]phenyl]-3-phenylpropan-1-one

Identifiers
CAS Number	81447-80-5
3D model (JSmol)	Interactive image
ChemSpider	64381
MeSH	C037836
PubChem CID	71249
UNII	1P35MD5C1F
CompTox Dashboard (EPA)	DTXSID10868613
- InChI: InChI=1S/C23H31NO3/c1-4-23(2,3)24-16-19(25)17-27-22-13-9-8-12-20(22)21(26)15-14-18-10-6-5-7-11-18/h5-13,19,24-25H,4,14-17H2,1-3H3 Key: VDKMYSMWQCFYBQ-UHFFFAOYSA-N; InChI=1/C23H31NO3/c1-4-23(2,3)24-16-19(25)17-27-22-13-9-8-12-20(22)21(26)15-14-18-10-6-5-7-11-18/h5-13,19,24-25H,4,14-17H2,1-3H3 Key: VDKMYSMWQCFYBQ-UHFFFAOYAV
- SMILES: CCC(C)(C)NCC(COC1=CC=CC=C1C(=O)CCC2=CC=CC=C2)O

Properties
Chemical formula	C_{23}H_{31}NO_{3}
Molar mass	369.505 g·mol^{−1}
- Except where otherwise noted, data are given for materials in their standard state (at 25 °C [77 °F], 100 kPa). Infobox references

Diprafenone is an antiarrhythmic beta adrenergic antagonist.
