= Dopamine agonist =

Compound that activates dopamine receptors

- Drug class
- The skeletal structure of dopamine

Class identifiers
- Use: Parkinson's disease, hyperprolactinemia, restless legs syndrome
- ATC code: N04BC
- Biological target: Dopamine receptors

External links
- MeSH: D010300

Legal status

A dopamine agonist is a compound that activates dopamine D_{2} receptors and belong to one of two different subclasses: ergoline and non-ergoline. Examples of ergoline agonists are cabergoline and bromocriptine and examples of non-ergoline agonists are pramipexole, ropinirole and rotigotine. Ergoline agonists have been linked to cartilage formation in heart valves.

Dopamine agonists are primarily used in the treatment of the motor symptoms of Parkinson's disease, and to a lesser extent, in hyperprolactinemia and restless legs syndrome. They are also used off-label in the treatment of clinical depression. One notable risk in the use of dopamine agonist is an increased risk of developing impulse-control disorders.

== Medical uses ==
=== Parkinson's disease ===
Dopamine agonists are mainly used in the treatment of Parkinson's disease. In Parkinson's disease dopaminergic (neurons that produce the neurotransmitter dopamine) neurons in the brain slowly break down and can eventually die. With decreasing levels of dopamine, the brain cannot function properly. This causes abnormal brain activity, which ultimately leads to the symptoms of Parkinson's disease. In their function as a treatment for Parkinson's disease, dopamine agonists act directly on the dopamine receptors and mimic dopamine's effect.

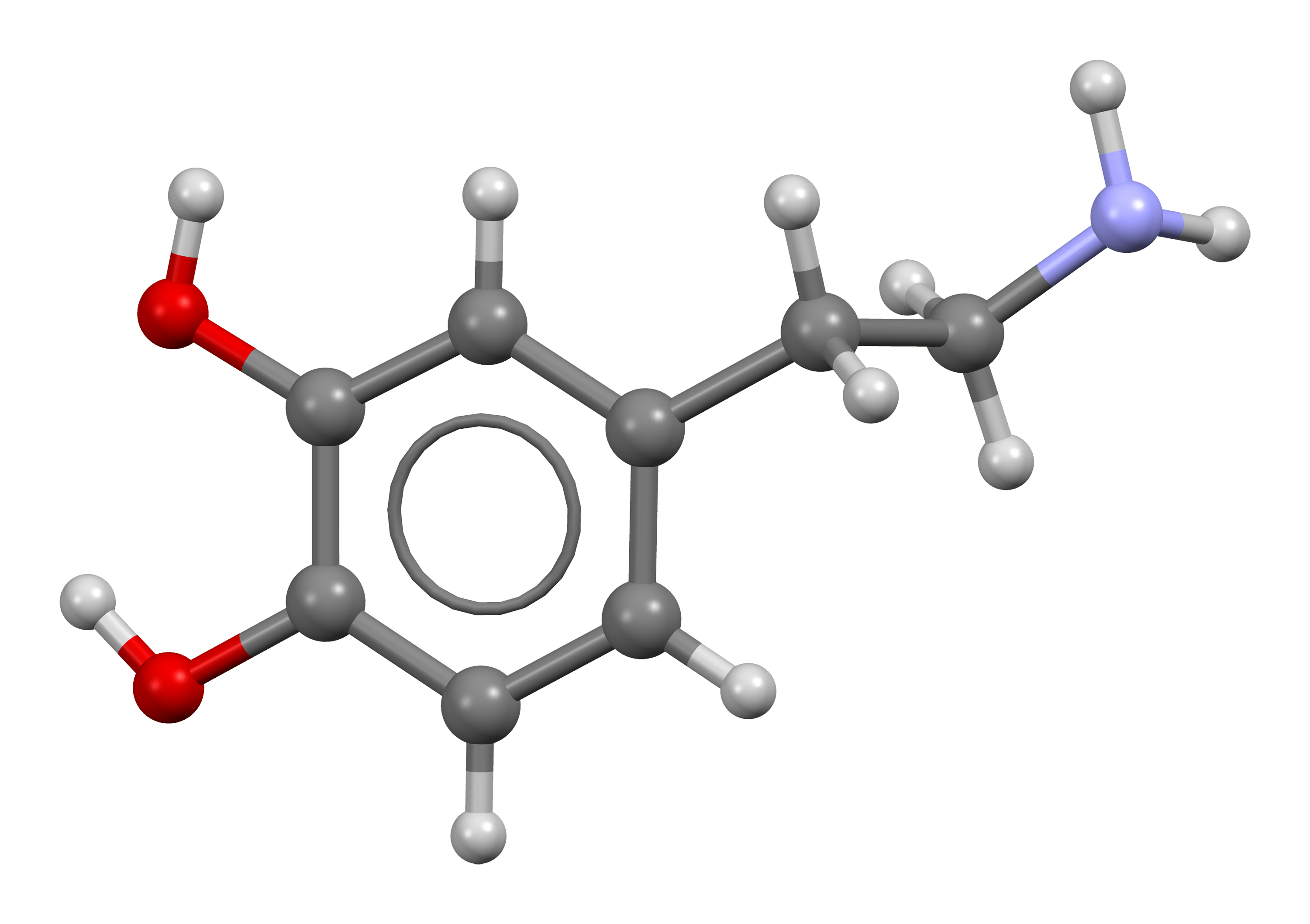
Dopamine

==== Treatment of depression in Parkinson's patients ====
Depressive symptoms and disorders are common in patients with Parkinson's disease and can affect their quality of life. Increased anxiety can accentuate the symptoms of Parkinson's and is therefore essential to treat. Instead of conventional antidepressant medication in treating depression, treatment with dopamine agonists has been suggested. Although preliminary evidence of clinical trials has shown interesting results, further research is crucial to establish the anti-depressive effects of dopamine agonists in treating depressive symptoms and disorders in those with Parkinson's.

=== Hyperprolactinemia ===
Dopamine inhibits the production of prolactin in the human body. Therefore, anything that disrupts the production of dopamine would cause an increase in the production of prolactin. The ergoline-derived dopamine agonists bromocriptine and cabegoline are used in the treatment of hyperprolactinaemia. These agents are associated with the reduction in the size of prolactinomas. It is believed that they do so by suppressing the hypersecretion of prolactin, resulting in normal gonadal function.

=== Restless leg syndrome ===
Numerous clinical trials have been performed to assess the use of dopamine agonists for the treatment of restless legs syndrome (RLS). RLS is identified by the strong urge to move and is a dopamine-dependent disorder. RLS symptoms decrease with the use of drugs that stimulate dopamine receptors and increase dopamine levels, such as dopamine agonists.

== Adverse effects ==
=== Side effects ===
Between the two classes of dopamine agonists, ergolines tend to cause the most side effects due to their lack of specificity, targeting D_{1}, 5-HT and adrenergic receptors in addition to their intended D_{2} receptor target. In addition, the risk of side effects is much higher in the elderly than the general population.

The most common adverse effects are constipation, nausea and headaches. Other serious side effects are hallucinations, peripheral edema, gastrointestinal ulcers, pulmonary fibrosis and psychosis.

Dopamine agonists have been linked to cardiac problems, with side effects such as hypotension, myocardial infarction, congestive heart failure, cardiac fibrosis, pericardial effusion and tachycardia. A high risk for valvular heart disease has been established in association with ergot-derived agonists especially in elderly patients with hypertension.

In some studies, almost 30% of patients are reported to have suffered from somnolence and sleep attacks when using dopamine agonists. Daytime sleepiness, insomnia and other sleep disturbances are also frequently associated with the use of these drugs.

Impulse control disorder, which manifests in behaviors such as gambling, hypersexuality, shopping addiction or binge eating, can be another serious adverse effect of dopamine agonists.

After long-term use of dopamine agonists a withdrawal syndrome may occur when discontinuing the drug or reducing the dose. The following side effects are possible: anxiety, panic attacks, dysphoria, depression, agitation, irritability, suicidal ideation, fatigue, orthostatic hypotension, nausea, vomiting, diaphoresis, generalised pain and drug cravings. For some individuals, these withdrawal symptoms are short-lived, and they make a full recovery. For others, a protracted withdrawal syndrome may occur with symptoms persisting for months or years.

=== Interactions ===
Dopamine agonists interact with a number of drugs but there is little evidence that they interact with other Parkinson's drugs. In most cases there is no reason not to co-administer Parkinson's drugs, but there have been indications that the concurrent use of dopamine agonists with L-DOPA can cause psychosis, and therefore in these cases it is recommended that either the dopamine agonist(s) be discontinued or the dose of L-DOPA reduced. Since ergot-dopamine agonist have antihypertensive qualities it is wise to monitor blood pressure when using dopamine agonists with antihypertensive drugs to ensure that the patient does not get hypotension. That includes the drug sildenafil which is commonly used to treat erectile dysfunction but also used for pulmonary hypertension.

There is evidence that suggests that since ergot dopamine agonists are metabolized by CYP3A4 enzyme concentration rises with the use of CYP3A4 inhibitors. For example, in one study bromocriptine was given with a CYP3A4 inhibitor and the AUC (area under the curve) increased 268%. Ropinirole is a non-ergot derived dopamine agonist and concomitant use with a CYP1A2 inhibitor can result in a higher concentration of ropinirole. When discontinuing the CYP1A2 inhibitor, if using both drugs, there is a chance that a dose adjustment for ropinirole is needed. There is also evidence the dopamine agonists inhibit various CYP enzymes and therefore they may inhibit the metabolism of certain drugs.

== Ergoline agonists ==
Ergoline, which forms the core structure of the subclass of dopamine agonists that share its name

Ergoline agonists share the same base ergoline structure, which is derived from the ergot fungus. Ergot alkaloids are divided into two groups: amino acid ergot alkaloids and amine ergot alkaloids.

In terms of efficacy, there does not seem to be much difference between ergoline agonists and their non-ergoline counterparts. However, ergolines are known to have a more concerning side effect profile, chiefly the added risk of valvular heart disease and cartilage formation within the heart valves. In addition, ergoline agonists are less specific than non-ergoline agonists, targeting both 5-HT receptors and adrenergic receptors in addition to the primary D_{2} receptor targets. It is for this reason that non-ergoline agonists are currently more preferred for treatment.

== Pharmacokinetics ==
=== Ergolines ===
==== Bromocriptine ====
Absorption of bromocriptine oral dose is approximately 28%; however, only 6% reaches the systemic circulation unchanged, due to a substantial first-pass effect. Bromocriptine reaches mean peak plasma levels after about 1–1.5 hours after a single oral dose. The drug has high protein binding, ranging from 90-96% bound to serum albumin. Bromocriptine is metabolized by CYP3A4 and excreted primarily in the feces via biliary secretion. Metabolites and parent drugs are mostly excreted via the liver, but also 6% via the kidney. It has a half-life of 2–8 hours.

==== Pergolide ====
Pergolide has a long half-life of about 27 hours and reaches a mean peak plasma level in about 2–3 hours after a single oral dose. The protein binding is 90% and the drug is mainly metabolized in the liver by CYP3A4 and CYP2D6. The major route of excretion is through the kidneys.

Drug	Maintenance	Half-life	Protein binding	Peak plasma	Metabolism	Excretion
Bromocriptine	Oral, 2.5–40 mg/day	2–8 hours	90-96%	1-1,5 hours	Hepatic, via CYP3A4, 93% first-pass metabolism	Bile, 94-98% Renal, 2-6%
Pergolide	Oral, 0.05 mg/day Usual response up to 0.1 mg per day	27 hours	90%	2–3 hours	Extensively hepatic	Renal, 50% Fecal 50%

=== Non-ergolines ===
==== Pramipexole ====
Pramipexole, in its instant release formulation, reaches maximum plasma concentration 1–3 hours post-dose. It is about 15% bound to plasma proteins and the metabolism is minimal. The elimination half-life of pramipexole is varies with age, being approximately 8 hours in younger subjects and 12 hours in the elderly. The drug is mostly excreted in the urine, around 90%, but also in feces.

==== Ropinirole ====
Ropinirole is rapidly absorbed after a single oral dose, reaching plasma concentration in approximately 1–2 hours. The half-life is around 5–6 hours. Ropinirole is heavily metabolized by the liver and in vitro studies show that the enzyme involved in the metabolism of ropinirole is CYP1A2.

==== Rotigotine ====
Since rotigotine is a transdermal patch it provides continuous drug delivery over 24 hours. It has a half-life of 3 hours and the protein binding is around 92% in vitro and 89.5% in vivo. Rotigotine is extensively and rapidly metabolized in the liver and by the CYP enzymes. The drug is mostly excreted in urine (71%), but also in feces (23%).

Drug	Maintenance	Half-life	Protein binding	Peak plasma	Metabolism	Excretion
Pramipexole	Oral, 0.125 mg 3x/day (IR) Oral, 0.375 mg/day (ER)	8–12 hours	15%	1–3 hours	Minimal < 10%	Urine 90% Fecal 2%
Ropinirole	Oral, 0.25 mg 3x/day (IR) Oral, 2 mg/day (ER)	5–6 hours	10-40%	1–2 hours	Hepatic, via P450 CYP1A2 — can increase ↑ INR	Renal > 88%
Rotigotine	Transdermal, 2 – 4 mg/day	3 hours	92%	24 hours	Hepatic (CYP-mediated).	Urine 71% Fecal 23%

== Mechanism of action ==
The dopamine receptors are members of the G protein-coupled receptors superfamily with seven transmembrane domains.

G protein-coupled receptors

Due to their mechanism of action on adenylate cyclase enzyme, dopamine receptors are subdivided into two subclasses: D_{1}-like and D_{2}-like. D_{1}- and D_{5}-receptors belong to the D_{1}-like family and the D_{2}-like family includes D_{2}, D_{3} and D_{4} receptors. D_{1}-like receptors are primarily coupled to Gα_{s/olf} proteins and activates adenylate cyclase which increases intracellular levels of cAMP, they also activate the G_{βγ} complex and the N-type Ca^{2+} channel. D_{2}-like receptors decrease intracellular levels of the second messenger cAMP by inhibiting adenylate cyclase.

=== Bromocriptine ===
Bromocriptine is an ergot derivative, semi-synthetic. Bromocriptine is a D_{2} receptor agonist and D_{1} receptor antagonist with a binding affinity to D_{2} receptors of anterior pituitary cells, exclusively on lactotrophs. Bromocriptine stimulates Na^{+}, K^{+}-ATPase activity and/or cytosolic Ca^{2+} elevation and therefore reduction of prolactin which leads to no production of cAMP.

=== Pramipexole ===
Pramipexole is a highly active non-ergot D_{2}-like receptor agonist with a higher binding affinity to D_{3} receptors rather than D_{2} or D_{4} receptors. The mechanism of action of pramipexole is mostly unknown, it is thought to be involved in the activation of dopamine receptors in the area of the brain where the striatum and the substantia nigra is located. This stimulation of dopamine receptors in the striatum may lead to the better movement performance.

== Structure–activity relationship ==
When dealing with agonists it can be extremely complex to confirm relationships between structure and biological activity. Agonists generate responses from living tissues. Therefore, their activity depends both on their efficacy to activate receptors and their affinity to bind to receptors.

=== Crossing the blood brain barrier ===
Many molecules are unable to cross the blood–brain barrier (BBB). Molecules must be small, non-polar and lipophilic to cross over. Compounds without these qualities must have a specific transporter that can transport them over the BBB. Dopamine cannot diffuse across the BBB because of the catechol group, it is too polar and therefore unable to enter the brain. The catechol group is a dihydroxy benzene ring.

The synthesis of dopamine consists of three stages. The synthesis process starts with an amino acid, called L-tyrosine. In the second stage L-DOPA (levodopa) is formed by adding a phenol group to the benzene ring of L-tyrosine. The formation of L-DOPA from L-tyrosine is catalyzed by the enzyme tyrosine hydroxylase. The third stage is the formation of dopamine by removing the carboxylic acid group from L-DOPA, catalysed by the enzyme dopa decarboxylase.

Levodopa is also too polar to cross the blood brain barrier but it is an amino acid and has a specialized transporter called L-type amino acid transporter or LAT-1 that helps it diffuse through the barrier.

=== Dopamine ===
When dopamine interacts with ATP, which is a component of some dopamine receptors, it has a significant preference for a trans-conformation of the dopamine molecule. The dopamine-ATP complex is stabilised by hydrogen bonding between catechol hydroxyls and purine nitrogens and by electrostatic interactions between the protonated ammonium group of dopamine and a negative phosphate group. Two conformers of dopamine have been identified as alpha- and beta-conformers in which the catechol ring is coplanar with the plane of the ethylamine side chain. They are substantial in agonist-receptor interactions.

=== Ergoline derivatives ===
Central dopaminergic agonist properties of semisynthetic ergoline derivatives lergotrile, pergolide, bromocriptine, cabergoline and lisuride have been established. Some studies suggest that ergot alkaloids have the properties of mixed agonist-antagonist with regards to certain presynaptic and postsynaptic receptors. N-n-Propyl groups (chemical formula: –CH_{2}CH_{2}CH_{3}) frequently enhance dopamine agonist effects in the ergoline derivatives.

Bromocriptine

The (+)-enantiomer displays notably diminished activity whereas the (-)-enantiomer possess potent dopamine agonist properties.

==== Bromocriptine ====
Bromocriptine has an amino acid ergot alkaloid structure. It contains a bromine halogen on the ergot structure which increases the affinity for the D_{2}-receptor but often reduces the efficacy. The similarity between the dopamine structure and the ergoline ring in bromocriptine is likely the cause for its action on the dopamine receptors. It has shown to have equal affinity for D_{2}- and D_{3}-receptor and much lower affinity for D_{1}-receptor.

Apomorphine

=== Non-ergoline derivatives ===
Non-ergoline dopamine receptor agonists have higher binding affinity to dopamine D_{3}-receptors than dopamine D_{2}-receptors. This binding affinity is related to D_{2} and D_{3} receptor homology, the homology between them has a high degree of sequence and is closest in their transmembrane domains, were they share around 75% of the amino acid.

Rotigotine

==== Apomorphine ====
Apomorphine has a catechol element and belongs to a class called β-phenylethylamines and its main components are similar to the dopamine structure. The effect that apomorphine has on the dopamine receptors can also be linked to the similarities between its structure and dopamine. It is a chiral molecule and thus can be acquired in both the R and S form, the R form is the one that is used in therapy. When apomorphine interacts with the dopamine receptor, or the ATP on the receptor, the catechol and nitrogen are important to stabilize the structure with hydrogen bonding. The position of the hydroxyl groups is also important and monohydroxy derivatives have been found to be less potent than the dihydroxy groups. There are a number of stability concerns with apomorphine such as oxidation and racemization.

==== Rotigotine ====
Rotigotine is a phenolic amine and thus has poor oral bioavailability and fast clearance from the body. Therefore, it has been formulated as a transdermal patch, first and foremost to prevent first pass metabolism in the liver.

== Ligands ==
Examples of dopamine agonists include:

=== Partial agonist ===
- Aripiprazole (Partial agonist of the D_{2} family receptors - Trade name "Abilify" in the United States; atypical antipsychotic)
- Brexpiprazole (Partial agonist of the D_{2} family receptors - Trade name "Rexulti" in the United States; atypical antipsychotic)
- Cariprazine (Partial agonist of the D_{2} family receptors and D_{3} receptor - Trade name "Vraylar" in the United States; atypical antipsychotic)
- Phencyclidine (a.k.a. PCP; partial agonist. Psychoactivity mainly due to NMDA antagonism)
- Quinpirole (Partial agonist of the D_{2} and D_{3} family of receptors)
- Salvinorin A (chief active constituent of the psychedelic herb salvia divinorum, the psychoactivity of which is mainly due to Kappa-opioid receptor agonism; partial agonist at the D_{2} with an Intrinsic activity of 40-60%, binding affinity of K_{i}=5-10nM and EC_{50}=50-90nM)

=== Agonists of full/unknown efficacy ===
- Apomorphine (Apokyn – used to treat Parkinson's disease & Restless leg syndrome ) – biased at the D1 receptor.
- Bromocriptine (Parlodel – used to treat PD/RLS)
- Cabergoline (Dostinex – used to treat PD/RLS)
- Ciladopa (used to treat PD/RLS)
- Dihydrexidine (used to treat PD/RLS)
- Dinapsoline (used to treat PD/RLS)
- Doxanthrine (used to treat PD/RLS)
- Epicriptine (used to treat PD/RLS)
- Lisuride (used to treat PD/RLS)
- Pergolide (used to treat PD/RLS) – previously available as Permax, but removed from the market in the USA on March 29, 2007.
- Piribedil (Pronoran and Trivastal – used to treat PD/RLS)
- Pramipexole (Mirapex and Sifrol – used to treat PD/RLS)
- Propylnorapomorphine (used to treat PD/RLS)
- Quinagolide (Norprolac – used to treat PD/RLS)
- Ropinirole (Requip – used to treat PD/RLS)
- Rotigotine (Neupro – used to treat PD/RLS)
- Roxindole (used to treat PD/RLS)
- Sumanirole (used to treat PD/RLS)

Some, such as fenoldopam, are selective for dopamine receptor D1.

=== Related class of drugs: Indirect agonists ===
There are two classes of drugs that act as indirect agonists of dopamine receptors: dopamine reuptake inhibitors and dopamine releasing agents. These are not considered dopamine agonists, since they have no specific agonist activity at dopamine receptors, but they are nonetheless related. Indirect agonists are prescribed for a wider range of conditions than standard dopamine agonists.

The most commonly prescribed indirect agonists of dopamine receptors include:

- Amphetamine and/or dextroamphetamine (used to treat ADHD, narcolepsy, and obesity)
- Bupropion (used to facilitate smoking cessation and treat nicotine addiction and clinical depression)
- Lisdexamfetamine (used to treat ADHD and binge eating disorder)
- Methylphenidate or dexmethylphenidate (used to treat ADHD and narcolepsy)
- Modafinil or armodafinil (used primarily to treat narcolepsy)

Other examples include:

- Cathinone
- Caffeine
- Cocaine (anesthetic with no medical uses as a central nervous system stimulant)
- Methamphetamine (used in rare circumstances to treat ADHD and obesity)
- Phenethylamine (endogenous trace amine)
- p-Tyramine (endogenous trace amine)

== History ==
Since the late 1960 Levodopa (L-DOPA) has been used to treat Parkinson's disease but there has always been a debate whether the treatment is worth the side effects. Around 1970 clinicians started using the dopamine agonist apomorphine alongside L-DOPA to minimize the side effects caused by L-DOPA, the dopamine agonists bind to the dopamine receptor in the absence of dopamine. Apomorphine had limited use since it had considerable side effects and difficulty with administration. In 1974 bromocriptine was use widely after clinicians discovered its benefits in treating Parkinsons. When using the two drug classes together there is a possibility to reduce the amount of L-DOPA by 20-30% and thus keeping the fluctuating motor responses to a minimum. Dopamine agonists are often used in younger people as monotherapy and as initial therapy instead of L-DOPA. Although it is important to know that there is a correlation between the two drugs, if l-DOPA doesn't work dopamine agonists are also ineffective.

The early dopamine agonists, such as bromocriptine, were ergot derived and activated the D_{2}-receptor. They induced major side effects such as fibrosis of cardiac valves. It is considered that the reason they induced such side effects is that they activate many types of receptors.

Due to the major adverse effects of ergot-derived dopamine agonists, they are generally not used in modern medicine and have mostly been abandoned in favor of non-ergot agonists such as pramipexole, ropinirole and rotigotine. They do not induce as serious side effects although common side effects are nausea, edema and hypotension. Patients have also shown impaired impulse control such as overspending, hypersexuality and gambling.

== See also ==
- Dopamine antagonist
- Dopamine reuptake inhibitor
- Monoaminergic
- Dopaminergic
- Serotonergic
- Adrenergic
