= Dopamine dysregulation syndrome =

Neuralogical disorder caused by long-term use of dopaminergic drugs

- Two-dimensional skeletal formula of the dopamine molecule. Dopamine receptor agonists mediate the development of DDS.
- Specialty: Neurology, Psychiatry
- Symptoms: Impulsivity, hypersexuality, repetitive and obsessive behavior, addiction to offending medication
- Complications: Psychosis, addiction, marital problems, financial problems
- Causes: Dopaminergic drugs (e.g., dopamine agonists, levodopa)
- Treatment: Reduce intake of dopaminergic drug
- Medication: Antipsychotics, valproate

Dopamine dysregulation syndrome (DDS) is a rare dysfunction of the reward system observed in some individuals taking dopaminergic medications for an extended length of time. It is characterized by severely disinhibited patterns of behavior, leading to problems such as addiction to the offending medication, compulsive gambling, or compulsive sexual behavior. It typically occurs in people with Parkinson's disease (PD) or restless legs syndrome (RLS) who have taken dopamine agonist medications for an extended period of time.

== Signs and symptoms ==
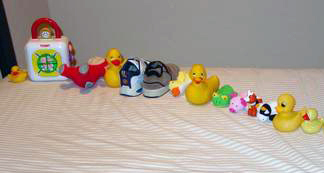
Punding, a possible symptom of DDS, is the repetition of complex motor behaviors such as collecting or arranging objects.

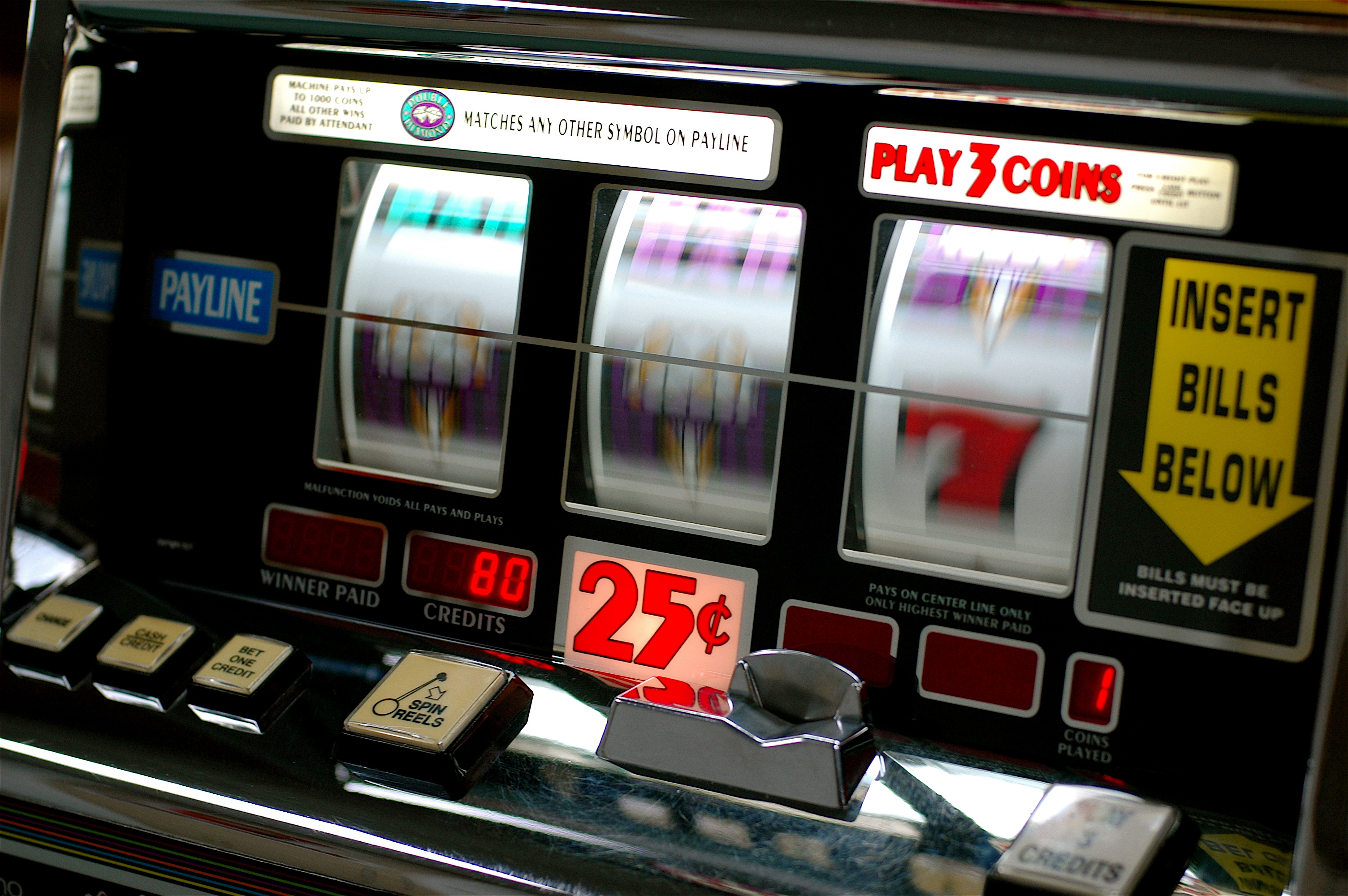
A slot machine, commonly used for gambling.

The most common symptom is craving for the dopaminergic medication. However, other behavioral symptoms can appear independently of cravings or co-occur with it. Cravings are an intense impulse of the subject to obtain medication even in the absence of symptoms that indicate its intake. To fulfill this need, the person will self-administer extra doses. When self-administration is not possible, aggressive outbursts or the use of strategies such as symptom simulation or bribery to access additional medication can also appear.

Hypomania, manifesting with feelings of euphoria, omnipotence, or grandiosity are prone to appear in those moments when medication effects are at their maximum; dysphoria, characterized by sadness, psychomotor slowing, fatigue or apathy are typical with dopamine replacement therapy (DRT) withdrawal. Different impulse-control disorders have been described including compulsive gambling, compulsive shopping, eating disorders, and hypersexuality. Behavioral disturbances, most commonly aggressive tendencies, are the norm. Psychosis is also common.

== Causes ==
Parkinson's disease is a common neurodegenerative disease characterized by a degeneration of dopamine neurons in the substantia nigra and a loss of dopamine in the putamen. It is described as a motor disease, but it also produces cognitive and behavioral symptoms. The most common treatment is dopamine replacement therapy, which consists in the administration of levodopa (L-DOPA) or dopamine agonists (e.g., pramipexole or ropinirole) to patients. Dopamine replacement therapy is well known to improve motor symptoms but its effects in cognitive and behavioral symptoms are more complex. Dopamine has been related to the normal learning of stimuli with behavioral and motivational significance, attention, and most importantly the reward system. In accordance with the role of dopamine in reward processing, addictive drugs stimulate dopamine release. Although the exact mechanism has yet to be elucidated, the role of dopamine in the reward system and addiction has been proposed as the origin of DDS. Models of addiction have been used to explain how dopamine replacement therapy produces DDS. One of these models of addiction proposes that over the usage course of a drug there is a habituation to the rewarding effects that it produces at the initial stages. This habituation is thought to be dopamine mediated. With long-term administration of levodopa, the reward system gets used to it and needs higher quantities. As the user increases drug intake there is a loss of dopaminergic receptors in the striatum which acts in addition to an impairment in goal-direction mental functions to produce an enhancement of sensitization to dopamine therapy. The behavioral and mood symptoms of the syndrome are produced by the dopamine overdose.

The most commonly implicated drug in causing DDS is levodopa, a prodrug of dopamine and a non-selective dopamine receptor agonist. In a 2017 systematic review of DDS cases in Parkinson's disease patients, 88% of a total of 98 cases of DDS were related to levodopa. The remaining cases were due to the dopamine receptor agonists apomorphine (6%), pramipexole (3%), rotigotine (1%), ropinirole (1%), and piribedil (1%). In a 2019 systematic review of DDS in non-Parkinson's disease patients, levodopa was implicated in 11 of 14 or 79% of the cases, whereas the remainder were linked to the dopamine receptor agonists pramipexole, ropinirole, and talipexole. The levodopa-containing supplement Mucuna pruriens has also been reported as a cause of DDS in a case report.

== Diagnosis ==
Diagnosis of the syndrome is clinical since there are no laboratory tests to confirm it. For diagnosis a person with documented responsiveness to medication has to increase medication intake beyond dosage needed to relieve their parkinsonian symptoms in a pathological addiction-like pattern. A current mood disorder (e.g., depression, anxiety, or hypomania), behavioral disorder (e.g., excessive gambling, shopping, or sexual tendency, aggression, or social isolation) or an altered perception about the effect of medication also have to be present. A questionnaire on the typical symptoms of DDS has also been developed and can help in the diagnosis process.

== Prevention ==
The main prevention measure proposed is the prescription of the lowest possible dose of dopamine replacement therapy to individuals at risk. The minimization of the use of dopamine agonists, and of short duration formulations of L-DOPA can also decrease risk of the syndrome.

== Management ==
First choice management measure consists in the enforcement of a dopaminergic drug dosage reduction. If this decrease is maintained, dysregulation syndrome features soon decrease. Cessation of dopamine agonists therapy may also be of use. Some behavioral characteristics may respond to psychotherapy; and social support is important to control risk factors. In some cases antipsychotic drugs may also be of use in the presence of psychosis, aggression, gambling, or hypersexuality.

Based upon five case reports, valproate may have efficacy in controlling the symptoms of levodopa-induced DDS that arise from the use of levodopa for the treatment of Parkinson's disease.

== Epidemiology ==
DDS is not common among PD patients. Prevalence may be around 4%. Its prevalence is higher among males with an early onset of the disease. Previous substance abuse such as heavy drinking or drug intake seems to be the main risk factor along with a history of affective disorder.

== History ==
PD was first formally described in 1817; however, L-DOPA did not enter clinical practice until almost 1970. In these initial works there were already reports of neuropsychiatric complications. During the following decades cases featuring DDS symptoms in relation to dopamine therapy such as hypersexuality, gambling, or punding, appeared. DDS was first described as a syndrome in the year 2000. Three years later the first review articles on the syndrome were written, showing an increasing awareness of the DDS importance. Diagnostic criteria were proposed in 2005.
