= Etrabamine =

Clinical data
- Other names: JL-14839; JL14839; 14.839JL; 6-Methylamino-4,5,6,7-tetrahydrobenzothiazole
- Routes of administration: Oral
- Drug class: Dopamine receptor agonist; Dopamine D_{2} and D_{3} receptor agonist
- ATC code: None

Identifiers
- IUPAC name: N-methyl-4,5,6,7-tetrahydro-1,3-benzothiazol-6-amine
- CAS Number: 70590-58-8
- PubChem CID: 68895
- UNII: V55R69267Q
- ChEMBL: ChEMBL2106160
- CompTox Dashboard (EPA): DTXSID10867929

Chemical and physical data
- Formula: C_{8}H_{12}N_{2}S
- Molar mass: 168.26 g·mol^{−1}
- 3D model (JSmol): Interactive image
- SMILES: CNC1CCC2=C(C1)SC=N2
- InChI: InChI=1S/C8H12N2S/c1-9-6-2-3-7-8(4-6)11-5-10-7/h5-6,9H,2-4H2,1H3; Key:YDSVAKPJAOSZJA-UHFFFAOYSA-N

Etrabamine (INN; developmental code name JL-14839 or 14.839JL), also known as 6-methylamino-4,5,6,7-tetrahydrobenzothiazole, is a dopamine receptor agonist which was under development for the treatment of Parkinson's disease but was never marketed. It is taken orally.

The drug shows affinity for the dopamine D_{2} and D_{3} receptors (K_{i} = 2,620 nM and 300 nM, both for L-etrabamine). It acts as a dopamine D_{2} and D_{3} receptor agonist and does not appear to act as an agonist of the dopamine D_{1} receptor. Etrabamine produces stereotypy in rodents and to a greater extent than apomorphine. This can be blocked by the dopamine antagonists sulpiride, haloperidol, and pimozide. It reverses the hypolocomotion induced by the dopamine depleting agent reserpine in rodents. The drug reduces levels of dopamine metabolites in the striatum in rodents. It strongly suppresses prolactin levels in rodents.

The chemical synthesis of etrabamine has been described. The chemical structure of etrabamine was unlike that of other dopamine receptor agonists when it was first developed in the 1980s. Subsequently, pramipexole, a closely related derivative of etrabamine, was developed and introduced for the treatment of Parkinson's disease. Pramipexole shows 2.7- and 29-fold higher affinity for the dopamine D_{2} and D_{3} receptors than etrabamine, respectively. Various other analogues and derivatives of etrabamine besides pramipexole have also been developed.

Etrabamine was first described in the scientific literature in 1987. It was under development by Logeais. The drug reached phase 2 clinical trials prior to the discontinuation of its development in 1997. A close derivative known as pramipexole was first approved for medical use in 1997.

== See also ==
- List of investigational Parkinson's disease drugs
- Talipexole
