= C22H27NO =

The molecular formula C_{22}H_{27}NO (molar mass: 321.45 g/mol, exact mass: 321.2093 u) may refer to:

- Etybenzatropine, also known as ethybenztropine and tropethydrylin
- Phenazocine
