= CJ-1639 =

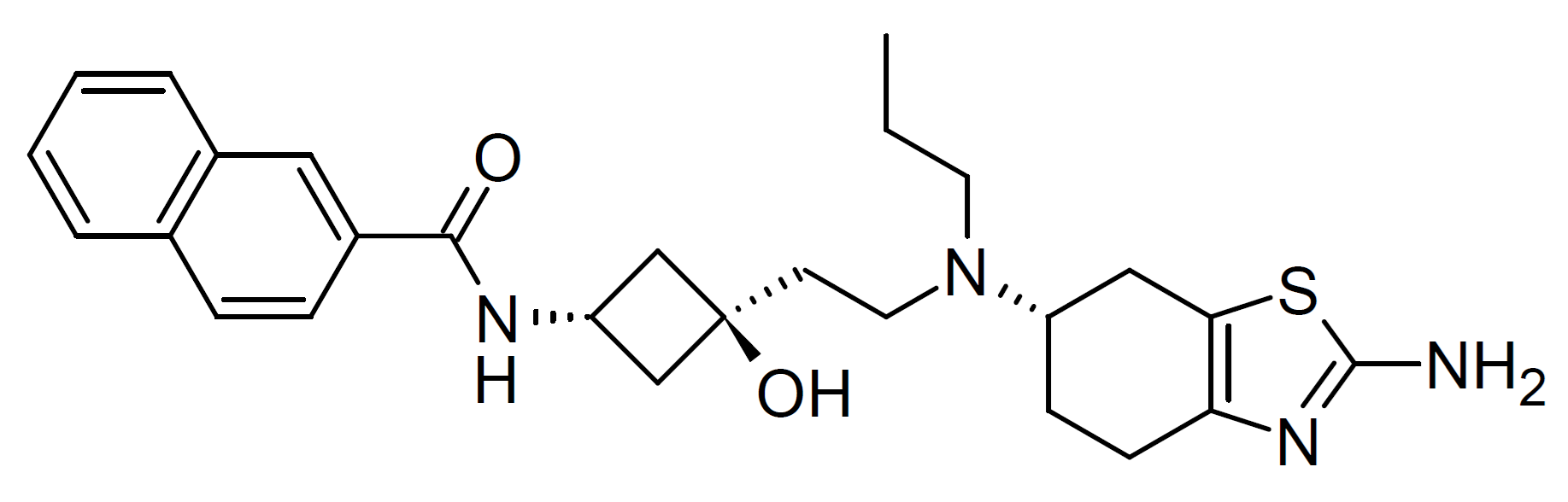

Identifiers
- IUPAC name: N-[3-[2-[[(6S)-2-amino-4,5,6,7-tetrahydro-1,3-benzothiazol-6-yl]-propylamino]ethyl]-3-hydroxycyclobutyl]naphthalene-2-carboxamide
- CAS Number: 1313759-88-4
- PubChem CID: 53475319

Chemical and physical data
- Formula: C_{27}H_{34}N_{4}O_{2}S
- Molar mass: 478.66 g·mol^{−1}
- 3D model (JSmol): Interactive image
- SMILES: CCCN(CCC1(CC(C1)NC(=O)C2=CC3=CC=CC=C3C=C2)O)[C@H]4CCC5=C(C4)SC(=N5)N
- InChI: InChI=1S/C27H34N4O2S/c1-2-12-31(22-9-10-23-24(15-22)34-26(28)30-23)13-11-27(33)16-21(17-27)29-25(32)20-8-7-18-5-3-4-6-19(18)14-20/h3-8,14,21-22,33H,2,9-13,15-17H2,1H3,(H2,28,30)(H,29,32)/t21?,22-,27?/m0/s1; Key:QXYZJXCNTMMWEO-ZVOVCPRUSA-N

CJ-1639 is a drug derived from pramipexole, which acts as a highly potent and selective full agonist for the dopamine D_{3} receptor. It has a K_{i} of 3.61 nM and is over 1000x selective for D_{3} over the D_{1} and D_{2} receptors.
