= C16H24N2 =

The molecular formula C_{16}H_{24}N_{2} (molar mass: 244.37 g/mol, exact mass: 244.193949) may refer to:

- Diisopropyltryptamine, a psychedelic hallucinogenic drug
- Dipropyltryptamine
- DPAI
- Indolylpropylaminopentane
- Isoaminile
- Propylisopropyltryptamine
- Xylometazoline
