= S3608 =

Identifiers
- IUPAC name: 2-[4-(2,3-dihydro-1-benzofuran-5-ylmethyl)piperazin-1-yl]-1,3-thiazole
- CAS Number: 55745-35-2
- PubChem CID: 171470
- ChemSpider: 149902
- UNII: 6ZQC8FH5JZ
- CompTox Dashboard (EPA): DTXSID50204298
- ECHA InfoCard: 100.054.333

Chemical and physical data
- Formula: C_{16}H_{19}N_{3}OS
- Molar mass: 301.41 g·mol^{−1}
- 3D model (JSmol): Interactive image
- SMILES: C1COC2=C1C=C(C=C2)CN3CCN(CC3)C4=NC=CS4
- InChI: InChI=1S/C16H19N3OS/c1-2-15-14(3-9-20-15)11-13(1)12-18-5-7-19(8-6-18)16-17-4-10-21-16/h1-2,4,10-11H,3,5-9,12H2; Key:PZGCFBVHUMLXBW-UHFFFAOYSA-N

S3608 is a piperazine derivative related to piribedil, which similarly acts as a dopamine D_{2} and D_{3} receptor agonist.
