= Matsupexole =

Clinical data
- Other names: Matsupexol; AM006; AM-006; KDT-3594; KDT3594
- Routes of administration: Oral
- Drug class: Dopamine receptor agonist; Dopamine D_{2} and D_{3} receptor agonist

Identifiers
- IUPAC name: (4aR,6R,8aR)-2-amino-3-cyano-N-[2-(dimethylamino)ethylcarbamoyl]-8-methyl-N-propyl-4a,5,6,7,8a,9-hexahydro-4H-thieno[3,2-g]quinoline-6-carboxamide
- CAS Number: 1399442-97-7
- PubChem CID: 66548529
- DrugBank: DB21715
- ChemSpider: 133328392
- UNII: K4UEG65HTX
- ChEMBL: ChEMBL6068022

Chemical and physical data
- Formula: C_{22}H_{34}N_{6}O_{2}S
- Molar mass: 446.61 g·mol^{−1}
- 3D model (JSmol): Interactive image
- SMILES: CCCN(C(=O)[C@@H]1C[C@@H]2CC3=C(C[C@H]2N(C1)C)SC(=C3C#N)N)C(=O)NCCN(C)C
- InChI: InChI=1S/C22H34N6O2S/c1-5-7-28(22(30)25-6-8-26(2)3)21(29)15-9-14-10-16-17(12-23)20(24)31-19(16)11-18(14)27(4)13-15/h14-15,18H,5-11,13,24H2,1-4H3,(H,25,30)/t14-,15-,18-/m1/s1; Key:PJYJWXOMQPHSKB-IIDMSEBBSA-N

Matsupexole (INN; developmental code names AM006 and KDT-3594) is a dopamine receptor agonist which is under development for the treatment of Parkinson's disease. It is taken orally.

The drug is a non-ergoline derivative related to pramipexole and acts as a dopamine D_{2} and D_{3} receptor agonist. It has far lower selectivity for the dopamine D_{3} receptor over the dopamine D_{2} receptor than pramipexole and other non-ergoline dopamine receptor agonists. Relatedly, whereas pramipexole and other non-ergoline dopamine receptor agonists like ropinirole and rotigotine produce somnolence in humans and pramipexole has been found to strongly promote non-REM sleep in rodents, these side effects being associated with dopamine D_{3} receptor agonism, matsupexole and cabergoline did not promote non-REM sleep at efficacious antiparkinsonian doses in rodents. This may be due to a better balance of wakefulness-promoting dopamine D_{2} receptor activation versus sedating dopamine D_{3} receptor activation. Similarly to pramipexole, but unlike cabergoline, matsupexole showed negligible activity as a serotonin 5-HT_{2B} receptor agonist and hence is not thought to have a risk of cardiac valvulopathy.

Matsupexole was first described in the scientific literature by 2017. It originated by Kissei Pharmaceutical and is being developed by Kissei Pharmaceutical and AffaMed Therapeutics in Japan and China. As of August 2025, the drug is in phase 2 clinical trials. Matsupexole is described by its developers as a potential best-in-class dopamine receptor agonist for Parkinson's disease.

== See also ==
- List of investigational Parkinson's disease drugs
