= C23H26N2O2 =

The molecular formula C_{23}H_{26}N_{2}O_{2} (molar mass: 362.465 g/mol, exact mass: 362.1994 u) may refer to:

- Dexetimide
- Solifenacin
