= C16H24N2O2 =

The molecular formula C_{16}H_{24}N_{2}O_{2} (molar mass : 276.37 g/mol) may refer to:

- 1-Boc-4-AP, an intermediate in the manufacture of fentanyl
- 5,6-MeO-MiPT, a lesser-known psychedelic drug
- Molindone, a therapeutic antipsychotic
- 7-Hydroxyropinirole
