= Piribedil =

Dopamine agonist medication

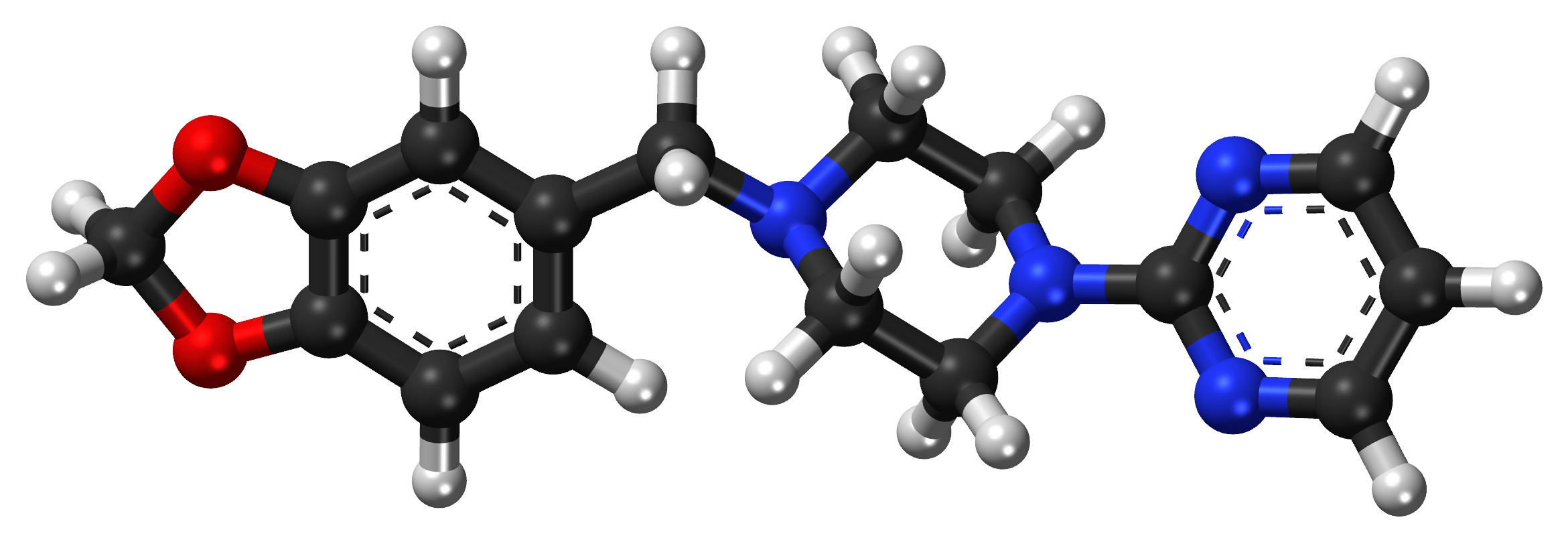

Clinical data
- Trade names: Pronoran, Trivastal Retard, Trastal, Trivastan, Clarium, others
- AHFS/Drugs.com: International Drug Names
- Routes of administration: By mouth
- ATC code: N04BC08 (WHO)

Legal status
- Legal status: EU: Rx-only; In general: ℞ (Prescription only)

Pharmacokinetic data
- Bioavailability: 10% (peak at 1 hour)
- Protein binding: 70–80%
- Metabolism: extensive liver
- Elimination half-life: 1.7–6.9 hours
- Excretion: Kidney (68%) and bile duct (25%)

Identifiers
- IUPAC name: 2-[4-(benzo[1,3]dioxol-5-ylmethyl)piperazin-1-yl]pyrimidine
- CAS Number: 3605-01-4
- PubChem CID: 4850
- IUPHAR/BPS: 49
- ChemSpider: 4684
- UNII: DO22K1PRDJ
- KEGG: D07305
- ChEMBL: ChEMBL1371770
- CompTox Dashboard (EPA): DTXSID9045188
- ECHA InfoCard: 100.020.695

Chemical and physical data
- Formula: C_{16}H_{18}N_{4}O_{2}
- Molar mass: 298.346 g·mol^{−1}
- 3D model (JSmol): Interactive image
- SMILES: C1CN(CCN1CC2=CC3=C(C=C2)OCO3)C4=NC=CC=N4
- InChI: InChI=1S/C16H18N4O2/c1-4-17-16(18-5-1)20-8-6-19(7-9-20)11-13-2-3-14-15(10-13)22-12-21-14/h1-5,10H,6-9,11-12H2; Key:OQDPVLVUJFGPGQ-UHFFFAOYSA-N

Piribedil is an antiparkinsonian agent and piperazine derivative which acts as a D_{2} and D_{3} receptor agonist. It also has α_{2}-adrenergic antagonist properties.

== Medical uses ==
- Treatment of Parkinson's disease (PD), either as monotherapy (without levodopa) or in combination with L-DOPA therapy, in the early stages of the disease as well as in the advanced ones
- Treatment of pathological cognitive deficits in the elderly (impaired attention, motivation, memory, etc.)
- Treatment of dizziness in the young patients
- Treatment of retinal ischemic manifestations
- Adjunctive treatment of intermittent claudication due to peripheral vascular disease (PVD) of the lower limbs (stage 2)
- Adjunctive treatment of anhedonia, apathy and treatment-resistant depression in unipolar and bipolar depressives (off-label)
- Treatment of gait disorders associated with Parkinson's disease (no related cause) and other forms of parkinsonism

=== Other uses ===
The drug has been shown to enhance working memory capacities in normal aging adults.

In age-related memory impairment, it has a positive effect on psychophysiological state of elderly people, improving memory and attention and increasing the velocity of psychomotor reactions and lability of nervous processes.

It enhances cognitive skill learning in healthy older adults.

It showed a positive effect in restless legs syndrome.

== Side effects ==
- Minor gastrointestinal upset (nausea, vomiting, flatulence, etc.) in predisposed individuals, or when taken between meals: adjust dosage individually, and/or add domperidone
- Orthostatic hypotension or drowsiness may occur, particularly in predisposed individuals (underlying condition or causative illness)
- Mild dizziness, confusion and feeling "drunk" also may occur

As with other dopamine agonists (like pramipexole and ropinirole), compulsive behavior like pathological gambling, overeating, excessive shopping, increased libido, sexual and/or other intense urges, may develop.

Another rare side effect of piribedil is excessive daytime sleepiness and unintended sleep episodes.

== Overdose ==
At very high doses, piribedil has an emetic action on the chemoreceptor trigger zone (CTZ). Tablets will thus be rapidly rejected, which explains why no data are currently available concerning the risk of overdosage.

== Interactions ==
Dopamine antagonists reduce the effect of piribedil.

== Pharmacology ==
=== Pharmacodynamics ===
- Dopamine receptor agonist, selective for subtypes D_{2} and D_{3}
- Dopamine receptor antagonist, selective for subtypes D_{4}.
- Adrenergic receptor antagonist, subtypes α_{2A} and α_{2C}.
- Lack of affinity to serotonin receptor 5-HT_{2B}.
