= Impulse-control disorder =

Class of mental disorders characterized by an inability to resist temptations or urges

- Other names: Impulse control disorder
- Specialty: Psychiatry, clinical psychology

Impulse-control disorder (ICD) is a class of psychiatric disorders characterized by impulsivity – failure to resist a temptation, an urge, or an impulse; or having the inability to not speak on a thought.

The fifth edition of the American Psychiatric Association's Diagnostic and Statistical Manual of Mental Disorders (DSM-5) that was published in 2013 includes a new chapter on disruptive, impulse-control, and conduct disorders covering disorders "characterized by problems in emotional and behavioral self-control". The World Health Organization publishes a similar list of impulse control disorders in its International Classification of Diseases (ICD), with some overlaps and differences.

Five behavioral stages characterize impulsivity: an impulse, growing tension, pleasure on acting, relief from the urge, and finally guilt (which may or may not arise).

== DSM-5 Types ==
The DSM-5 lists several disorders in its Disruptive, Impulse-Control, and Conduct Disorders chapter, without further specifying which of those categories each disorder may belong to. Trichotillomania (hair-pulling) and skin-picking were moved in DSM-5 to the obsessive–compulsive chapter, and "pathological gambling" was replaced with "gambling disorder" in the addictive disorders section.

Many other DSM-5 disorders may include difficulties in self-control of behavior. The ones in this chapter of the DSM-5 generally involve actions that violate others' rights, or cause conflicts with social norms, authorities, or laws. The underlying causes may be different in each disorder or each individual.

Several other new classifications were proposed prior to the publication of the DSM-5. Among those were compulsive–impulsive (C–I) Internet usage disorder, C–I sexual behaviors, C–I skin picking and C–I shopping. They were ultimately not included in those forms. The DSM-5 states that there is insufficient evidence to produce diagnostic criteria needed to establish repetitive behavior patterns sometimes called sex addiction, exercise addiction, or shopping addiction, as mental disorders, and thus they are not included, either as impulse control disorders or addictions.

=== Intermittent explosive disorder ===
Intermittent explosive disorder (IED) is a clinical condition of experiencing recurrent aggressive episodes that are out of proportion of any given stressor. Earlier studies reported a prevalence rate between 1–2% in a clinical setting, but a study done by Coccaro and colleagues in 2004 had reported about 11.1% lifetime prevalence and 3.2% one month prevalence in a sample of a moderate number of individuals (n=253). Based on the study, Coccaro and colleagues estimated the prevalence of IED in 1.4 million individuals in the US and 10 million with lifetime IED.

=== Antisocial personality disorder ===
This personality disorder is also dual coded in this chapter, because it is closely connected to the range of "externalizing" impulse control disorders.

=== Pyromania ===
Pyromania is characterized by impulsive and repetitive urges to deliberately start fires. Because of its nature, the number of studies performed for fire-setting are understandably limited. However, studies done on children and adolescents with pyromania have reported its prevalence to be between 2.4 and 3.5% in the United States. It has also been observed that the incidence of fire-setting is more common in juvenile and teenage boys than girls of the same age.

=== Kleptomania ===
Kleptomania is characterized by an impulsive urge to steal purely for the sake of gratification. In the US, the presence of kleptomania is unknown but has been estimated at 6 per 1000 individuals. Kleptomania is also thought to be the cause of 5% of annual shoplifting in the U.S. If true, 100,000 arrests are made in the U.S. annually due to kleptomaniac behavior.

== ICD-11 types ==
In common with the DSM-5, the World Health Organization's ICD-11 includes pyromania, kleptomania, and intermittent explosive disorder as impulse control disorders. Oppositional defiant disorder and conduct-dissocial disorder are instead listed under "disruptive behaviour or dissocial disorders". In contrast, it also includes several other disorders such as compulsive sexual behavior disorder, substance-induced impulse control disorders, gambling disorder, gaming disorder, body-focused repetitive behavior disorders (hair pulling, skin picking, etc.) and compulsive buying–shopping disorder, as forms of impulse control disorders.

=== Compulsive sexual behavior disorder ===
Sexual compulsion includes an increased urge in sexual behavior and thoughts. This compulsion may also lead to several consequences in the individual's life, including risky partner selection, increased chance for STIs and depression, as well as unwanted pregnancy. There has not yet been a determined estimate of its prevalence due to the secretiveness of the disorder. However, research conducted in the early 1990s in the United States gave prevalence estimates between 5–6% in the U.S. population, with male cases being higher than female.

=== Compulsive buying–shopping disorder ===
Compulsive shopping or buying is characterized by a frequent irresistible urge to shop even if the purchases are not needed or cannot be afforded. The prevalence of compulsive buying in the U.S. has been estimated to be 2–8% of the general adult population, with 80–95% of these cases being females. The onset is believed to occur in late teens or early twenties and the disorder is considered to be generally chronic.

== Signs and symptoms ==
The signs and symptoms of impulse-control disorders vary based on the age of the persons with them, the actual type of impulse-control that they are struggling with, the environment in which they are living, and whether they are male or female.

=== Co-morbidity ===
Complications of late Parkinson's disease may include a range of impulse-control disorders, including eating, buying, compulsive gambling, sexual behavior, and related behaviors (punding, hobbyism and walkabout). Prevalence studies suggest 13.6–36.0% of Parkinson's patients exhibit at least one form of ICD. There is a significant co-occurrence of pathological gambling (PG) and personality disorder, and is suggested to be caused partly by their common "genetic vulnerability". The degree of heritability to ICD is similar to other psychiatric disorders including substance use disorder. There has also been found a genetic factor to the development of ICD just as there is for substance use disorder. The risk for subclinical PG in a population is accounted for by the risk of alcohol dependence by about 12–20% genetic and 3–8% environmental factors. There is a high rate of co-morbidity between ADHD and other impulse-control disorders.

== Mechanism ==
Dysfunction of the striatum may prove to be the link between obsessive–compulsive disorder (OCD), ICD and substance use disorder (SUD). According to research, the "impulsiveness" that occurs in the later stages of OCD is caused by progressive dysfunction of the ventral striatal circuit. Whereas in case of ICD and SUD, the increased dysfunction of dorsal striatal circuit increases the "ICD and SUD behaviours that are driven by the compulsive processes". OCD and ICD have traditionally been viewed as two very different disorders, the former one is generally driven by the desire to avoid harm whereas the latter one driven "by reward-seeking behaviour". Still, there are certain behaviors similar in both, for example the compulsive actions of ICD patients and the behavior of reward-seeking (for example hoarding) in OCD patients.

== Treatment ==
Impulse-control disorders have two treatment options: psychosocial and pharmacological. Treatment methodology is informed by the presence of comorbid conditions.

=== Medication ===
In the case of pathological gambling, along with fluvoxamine, clomipramine has been shown effective in the treatment, with reducing the problems of pathological gambling in a subject by up to 90%. Whereas in trichotillomania, the use of clomipramine has again been found to be effective, fluoxetine has not produced consistent positive results. Fluoxetine, however, has produced positive results in the treatment of pathological skin picking disorder, although more research is needed to conclude this information. Fluoxetine has also been evaluated in treating IED and demonstrated significant improvement in reducing frequency and severity of impulsive aggression and irritability in a sample of 100 subjects who were randomized into a 14-week, double-blind study. Despite a large decrease in impulsive aggression behavior from baseline, only 44% of fluoxetine responders and 29% of all fluoxetine subjects were considered to be in full remission at the end of the study. Paroxetine has shown to be somewhat effective although the results are inconsistent. Another medication, escitalopram, has shown to improve the condition of the subjects of pathological gambling with anxiety symptoms. The results suggest that although SSRIs have shown positive results in the treatment of pathological gambling, inconsistent results with the use of SSRIs have been obtained which might suggest a neurological heterogeneity in the impulse-control disorder spectrum.

=== Psychosocial ===
The psychosocial approach to the treatment of ICDs includes cognitive behavioral therapy (CBT) which has been reported to have positive results in the case of treatment of pathological gambling and sexual addiction. There is general consensus that cognitive-behavioural therapies offer an effective intervention model.

==== Pyromania ====
Pyromania is harder to control in adults due to lack of co-operation; however, CBT is effective in treating child pyromaniacs. (Frey 2001)

==== Intermittent explosive disorder ====
Along with several other methods of treatments, cognitive behavioural therapy has also shown to be effective in the case of Intermittent explosive disorder as well. Cognitive Relaxation and Coping Skills Therapy (CRCST), which consists of 12 sessions starting first with the relaxation training followed by cognitive restructuring, then exposure therapy is taken. Later, the focus is on resisting aggressive impulses and taking other preventative measures.

==== Kleptomania ====
In the case of kleptomania, the cognitive behaviour techniques used in these cases consists of covert sensitization, imaginal desensitization, systematic desensitization, aversion therapy, relaxation training, and "alternative sources of satisfaction".

==== Compulsive buying ====
Although compulsive buying is not specified in the DSM, some researchers have suggested that it consists of core features that represent impulse-control disorders which includes preceding tension, difficult to resist urges and relief or pleasure after action. The efficiency of cognitive behavior therapy for compulsive buying is not truly determined yet; however, common techniques for the treatment include exposure and response prevention, relapse prevention, cognitive restructuring, covert sensitization, and stimulus control.

== See also ==
- Behavioral addiction
- Binge eating disorder
- Body-focused repetitive behavior
- Child pyromaniac
- Dopamine dysregulation syndrome
- Biopsychosocial model
