= Pyromania in children =

Child with an urge to set fires

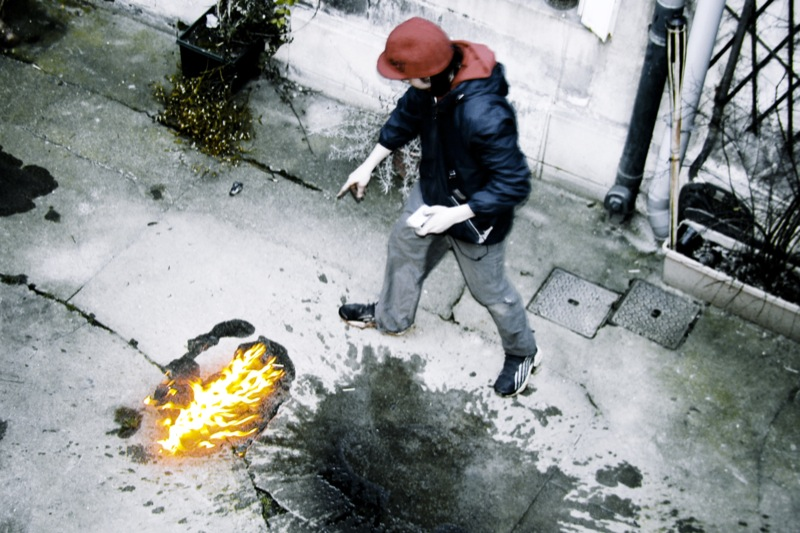

Pyromania is an impulse-control disorder that is primarily distinguished by a compulsion to set fires to relieve built-up tension. Child pyromania is the rarest form of fire-setting.

Most young children are not diagnosed with pyromania, but rather with conduct disorders. A key feature of pyromania is repeated association with fire without a real motive. Pyromania is not a commonly diagnosed disorder, and only occurs in about one percent of the population. It can occur in children as young as three years old.

About ninety percent of the people officially diagnosed with pyromania are male. Pyromaniacs and people with other mental illnesses are responsible for about 14% of fires.

== Symptoms and signs ==
Many clinical studies have found that fire-setting rarely occurs by itself, but usually occurs in addition to other socially unacceptable behavior. The motives that have earned the most attention are pleasure, a cry for help, retaliation against adults, and a desire to reunite the family.Fire-setting among children and teens can be recurring or periodic. Some children and teens may set fires often to release tension. Others may only seek to set fires during times of great stress. Some of the symptoms of pyromania are depression, conflicts in relationships, and trouble coping with stress and anxiety.

== Causes ==
Fire-setting is made up of five subcategories: the curious fire-setter, the sexually motivated fire-setter, the "cry for help" fire-setter, the "severely disturbed" group, and the rare form of pyromania. Pyromania usually surfaces in childhood, but there is no conclusive data about the average age of onset.Child pyromaniacs are usually filled with an uncontrollable urge to set fires to relieve tension. Not much is known about what genetically causes pyromania but there have been many studies that have explored the topic.

The causes of fire setting among young children and youths can be attributed to many factors, which are divided into individual and environmental factors:

- Individual factors are
1. Antisocial behaviors and attitudes: Children that set fires usually do not only set fires but also commit other crimes or offenses including vandalism, violence, anger, etc.
2. Sensation seeking: Some children are attracted to fire-setting because they are bored and are looking for something to do.
3. Attention seeking: Lighting a fire becomes a way to "get back" at adults and, in turn, produce a response from the adults.
4. Lack of social skills: Some children simply have not been taught enough social skills. Many children and adolescents who have been discovered setting fires consider themselves to be "loners".
5. Lack of fire-safety skills and ignorance of danger: This is what drives most children who do not display signs of pyromania- just natural curiosity and ignorance of the fire's destructive power.
6. Learning difficulties.
7. Parental conflicts like separation, neglect, and abuse.
8. Sexual abuse.
9. Maltreatment.
- Environmental factors are
1. Poor supervision by parents or guardians.
2. Seeing adults use fire inappropriately at an early age.
3. Parental neglect.
4. Parents abusing drugs or acting violently- this factor has been studied and the conclusions show that fire-setters are more likely in homes where the parents abuse them.
5. Peer pressure.
6. Stressful life events: Fire-setting becomes a way to cope with crises.

== Diagnosis ==
The Diagnostic and Statistical Manual of Mental Disorders, also known as the DSM, gives six standards that must be met for a child to be officially diagnosed with pyromania:

1. The child has to have set more than one fire deliberately.
2. Before setting the fire, the child must have felt some feelings of tension or arousal.
3. The child must show that he or she is attracted to fire and anything related to fire.
4. The child must feel a sense of relief or satisfaction from setting the fire and witnessing it.
5. The child does not have other motives like revenge, financial gain, delusions, or brain damage for setting the fire.
6. The fire-setting problem cannot be attributed to other disorders like anti-social personality disorder or conduct disorders.

Even though fire-setting and pyromania are prevalent in children, these standards are hard to apply to their age group. There is not a lot of experience in diagnosing pyromania, mainly because of the little experience that health care professionals have with fire-setting.

=== Comparison to child fire-setters ===
There are many important distinctions between a child pyromaniac and a child fire-setter. In general, a fire-setter is any individual who feels the impulse to set a fire for unusual reasons. While a child fire-setter is usually curious about fire and has the desire to learn more about it, a child with pyromania has an abnormally powerful, recurring impulse or desire to set intentional fires.

Pyromania is when the desire to set fires is repetitive and destructive to people or property. The most important difference between pyromania and fire-setting is that pyromania is a mental disorder, but fire-setting is simply a behavior and can be more easily fixed.

Minor or non-severe fire-setting is defined as "accidental or occasional fire-starting behavior" by unsupervised children. Usually these fires are started when a curious child plays with matches, lighters, or small fires. Juveniles in this minor group average at most 2.5 accidental fires in their lifetime. Most children in this group are between five and ten years of age and do not realize the dangers of playing with fire. Pathological fire-setting manifests when the action is "a deliberate, planned, and persistent behavior". Juveniles in this severe group set about 5.3 fires. Most young children are not diagnosed as having pyromania but conduct disorders.

== Treatment ==
If a child is diagnosed with pyromania, there are treatment options despite the lack of scientific research on the genetic cause. Studies have shown that children with repeat cases of setting fires tend to respond better to a case-management approach rather than a medical approach.

The first crucial step for treatment should be parents sitting down with their child and having a one-on-one interview. The interview itself should try to determine which stresses on the family, methods of discipline, or other factors contribute to the child's uncontrollable desire to set fires. Some examples of treatment methods are problem-solving skills, anger management, communication skills, aggression replacement training, and cognitive restructuring.

The chances that a child will recover from pyromania are very slim according to recent studies, but there are ways to channel the child's desire to set fires to relieve tension—for example, alternate activities such as playing a sport or an instrument.

Another method of treatment is fire-safety education. At times, the best method of treatment is child counseling or a residential treatment center.

However, since cases of child pyromania are so rare, there has not been enough research done on the success of these treatment methods. The most common and effective treatment of pyromania in children is behavioral modification. The results usually range from fair to poor. Behavioral modification seems to work on children with pyromaniac tendencies about 95% of the time.

== Epidemiology ==
Two basic types of children start fires. The first type is the curiosity fire-setter who starts the fire just to find out what will happen. The second type is the problem fire-setter who usually sets fires based on changes in their environment or due to a conduct disorder.

== History ==
Early studies into the causes of pyromania come from Freudian psychoanalysis. Around 1850, there were many arguments about the causes of pyromania.

The two biggest sides of the argument were whether pyromania comes from a mental or genetic disorder or moral deficiency. Freud reasoned that fire-setting was an archaic desire to gain power over nature.

The first study done on fire-setting behavior in children was in 1940 and was credited to Helen Yarnall, who compared fire-setting to fears of castration in male children and said that by setting a fire, some young males feel that they have gained power over adults. This 1940 study also introduced the idea that a good predictor of violent behavior in adult life is fire-setting and cruelty towards animals as a child.

In Argentina, juvenile serial killer Cayetano Santos Godino intermingled his murders of young children with intentional fires (at least seven known), being later diagnosed as a pyromaniac.
