= Phenglutarimide =

Chemical compound

Clinical data
- ATC code: N04AA09 (WHO)

Identifiers
- IUPAC name: 3-(2-Diethylaminoethyl)-4-phenylpiperidine-2,6-dione
- CAS Number: 1156-05-4
- PubChem CID: 102669
- ChemSpider: 92737
- UNII: 679RC9H8TG
- KEGG: D07301
- ChEMBL: ChEMBL1096643
- CompTox Dashboard (EPA): DTXSID0023450
- ECHA InfoCard: 100.013.261

Chemical and physical data
- Formula: C_{17}H_{24}N_{2}O_{2}
- Molar mass: 288.391 g·mol^{−1}
- 3D model (JSmol): Interactive image
- SMILES: CCN(CC)CC[C@]1(CCC(=O)NC1=O)c1ccccc1
- InChI: InChI=1S/C17H24N2O2/c1-3-19(4-2)13-12-17(14-8-6-5-7-9-14)11-10-15(20)18-16(17)21/h5-9H,3-4,10-13H2,1-2H3,(H,18,20,21); Key:BFMBKRQFMIILCH-UHFFFAOYSA-N

Phenglutarimide (brand names Aturbal and Aturbane) is an anticholinergic used as an antiparkinsonian agent.
