= ATC code N04 =

Pharmaceutical drug classification

ATC code N04 Anti-parkinson drugs is a therapeutic subgroup of the Anatomical Therapeutic Chemical Classification System, a system of alphanumeric codes developed by the World Health Organization (WHO) for the classification of drugs and other medical products. Subgroup N04 is part of the anatomical group N Nervous system.

Codes for veterinary use (ATCvet codes) can be created by placing the letter Q in front of the human ATC code: for example, QN04.
National versions of the ATC classification may include additional codes not present in this list, which follows the WHO version.

== N04A Anticholinergic agents ==
=== N04AA Tertiary amines ===
N04AA01 Trihexyphenidyl
N04AA02 Biperiden
N04AA03 Metixene
N04AA04 Procyclidine
N04AA05 Profenamine
N04AA08 Dexetimide
N04AA09 Phenglutarimide
N04AA10 Mazaticol
N04AA11 Bornaprine
N04AA12 Tropatepine

=== N04AB Ethers chemically close to antihistamines ===
N04AB01 Etanautine
N04AB02 Orphenadrine (chloride)

=== N04AC Ethers of tropine or tropine derivatives ===
N04AC01 Benzatropine
N04AC30 Etybenzatropine

== N04B Dopaminergic agents ==
=== N04BA Dopa and dopa derivatives ===
N04BA01 Levodopa
N04BA02 Levodopa and decarboxylase inhibitor
N04BA03 Levodopa, decarboxylase inhibitor and COMT inhibitor
N04BA04 Melevodopa
N04BA05 Melevodopa and decarboxylase inhibitor
N04BA06 Etilevodopa and decarboxylase inhibitor
N04BA07 Foslevodopa and decarboxylase inhibitor

=== N04BB Adamantane derivatives ===
N04BB01 Amantadine

=== N04BC Dopamine agonists ===
N04BC01 Bromocriptine
N04BC02 Pergolide
N04BC03 Dihydroergocryptine mesylate
N04BC04 Ropinirole
N04BC05 Pramipexole
N04BC06 Cabergoline
N04BC07 Apomorphine
N04BC08 Piribedil
N04BC09 Rotigotine

=== N04BD Monoamine oxidase B inhibitors ===
N04BD01 Selegiline
N04BD02 Rasagiline
N04BD03 Safinamide

=== N04BX Other dopaminergic agents ===
N04BX01 Tolcapone
N04BX02 Entacapone
N04BX03 Budipine
N04BX04 Opicapone

== N04C Other antiparkinson drugs ==
=== N04CX Other antiparkinson drugs ===
N04CX01 Istradefylline
