= Tropatepine =

Chemical compound

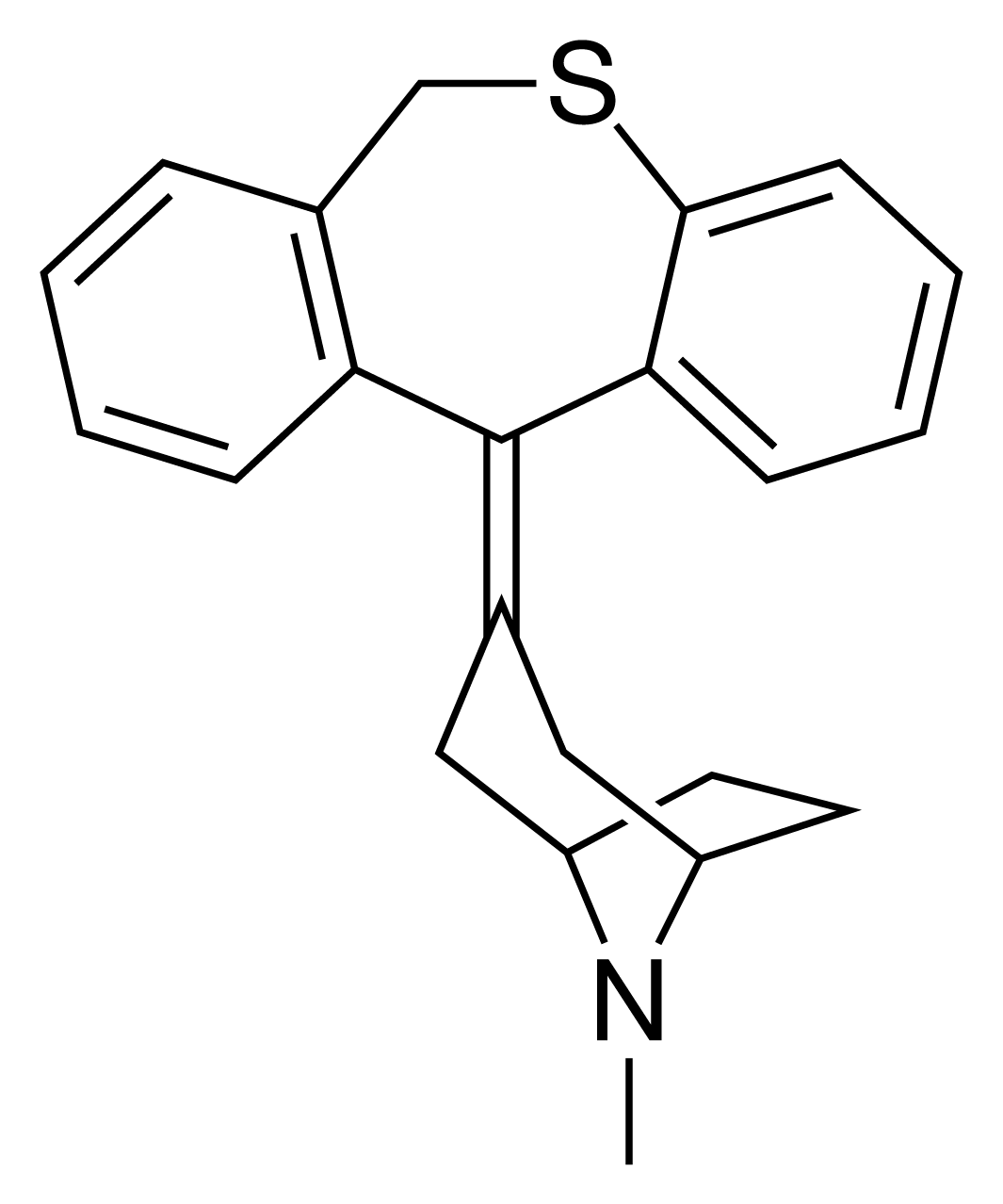

Clinical data
- Trade names: Lepticur
- AHFS/Drugs.com: International Drug Names
- ATC code: N04AA12 (WHO)

Identifiers
- IUPAC name: (1S,5S)-3-dibenzo[b,e]thiepin-11(6H)-ylidene-8-methyl-8-azabicyclo[3.2.1]octane
- CAS Number: 27574-24-9
- PubChem CID: 198068
- ChemSpider: 171431
- UNII: C27HY5RFU5
- KEGG: D07303
- CompTox Dashboard (EPA): DTXSID70865380

Chemical and physical data
- Formula: C_{22}H_{23}NS
- Molar mass: 333.49 g·mol^{−1}
- 3D model (JSmol): Interactive image
- SMILES: S3c1ccccc1/C(c2c(cccc2)C3)=C5/CC4N(C)C(CC4)C5
- InChI: InChI=1S/C22H23NS/c1-23-17-10-11-18(23)13-16(12-17)22-19-7-3-2-6-15(19)14-24-21-9-5-4-8-20(21)22/h2-9,17-18H,10-14H2,1H3; Key:JOQKFRLFXDPXHX-UHFFFAOYSA-N

Tropatepine (brand name Lepticur) is an anticholinergic used as an antiparkinsonian agent.

== Synthesis ==
Tropatepine can be synthesized from 3-chlorotropane (1). A Grignard reaction between 3-chlorotropane and dibenzo[b,e]thiepin-11(6H)-one (2) followed by dehydration to the olefin produces tropatepine (3).

Synthesis of tropatepine

== See also ==
- Muscarinic antagonist
