= Bornaprine =

Chemical compound

Clinical data
- AHFS/Drugs.com: International Drug Names
- Routes of administration: Oral, intravenous, subcutaneous, transdermal
- ATC code: N04AA11 (WHO)

Pharmacokinetic data
- Elimination half-life: 30 hours
- Excretion: Urine, feces

Identifiers
- IUPAC name: 3-diethylaminopropyl 6-cyclohexylbicyclo[2.2.1]heptane-6-carboxylate
- CAS Number: 20448-86-6 26908-91-8
- PubChem CID: 30160
- ChemSpider: 28011
- UNII: 9M363FGA7J
- CompTox Dashboard (EPA): DTXSID20864944
- ECHA InfoCard: 100.205.286

Chemical and physical data
- Formula: C_{21}H_{31}NO_{2}
- Molar mass: 329.484 g·mol^{−1}
- 3D model (JSmol): Interactive image
- Density: 1.056 g/cm^{3}
- Boiling point: 434.3 °C (813.7 °F)
- SMILES: O=C(OCCCN(CC)CC)C2(c1ccccc1)CC3CCC2C3
- InChI: InChI=1S/C21H31NO2/c1-3-22(4-2)13-8-14-24-20(23)21(18-9-6-5-7-10-18)16-17-11-12-19(21)15-17/h5-7,9-10,17,19H,3-4,8,11-16H2,1-2H3; Key:BDNMABJZSXTKAQ-UHFFFAOYSA-N

Bornaprine (brand name Sormodrem) is a synthetic anticholinergic medication that is primarily used to treat Parkinson's disease. Additionally, bornaprine has been used to treat other disorders, including hyperhidrosis.

== History ==
Bornaprine was first synthesized in 1960 by the German scientist H Haas, under the name Kr 399. Additional tests revealed that bornaprine was significantly more effective than nicotine at antagonizing choline. Because of its anticholinergic effects, it was intended to help with the symptoms of Parkinson's. Early clinical trials with Parkinsonian patients (completed in Germany), showed that bornaprine was successful at treating many of the key side-effects of Parkinson's including akinesia, language, tremors, and psychological symptoms.

== Pharmacodynamics ==
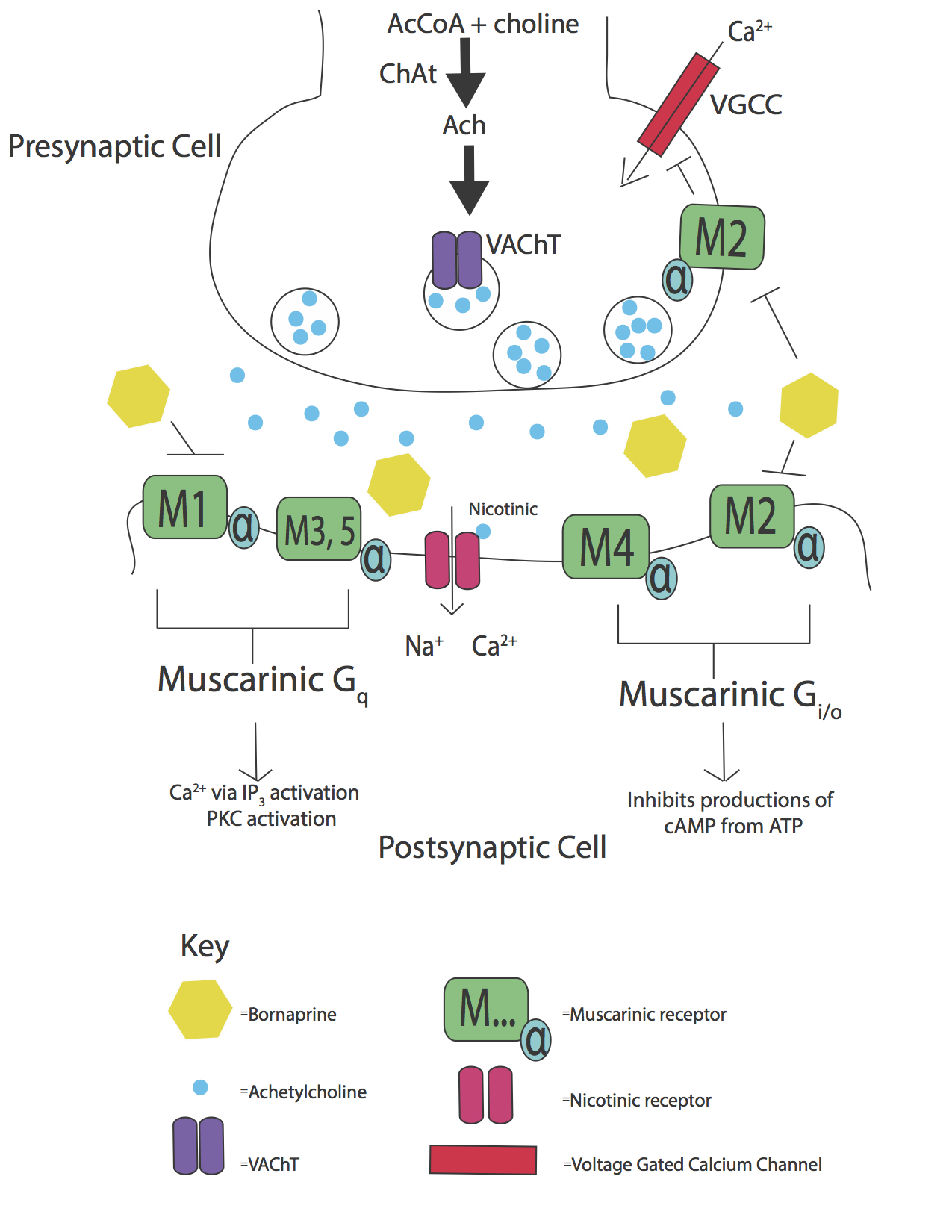
Bornaprine pathway

Bornaprine is an antimuscarinic agent that nonselectively antagonizes muscarinic acetylcholine receptors, M1 and M2. Bornaprine has been characterized as a very potent anticholinergic medication and further clinical trials have indicated its effectiveness at treating parkinsonian tremors. Bornaprine also has a pa2 value (affinity of antagonist for receptor) of 7.27 ± 0.21 indicating a high potency.

== Pharmacokinetics ==
=== Absorption ===
Bornaprine is successfully absorbed into the plasma of humans within 1–2 hours after an oral dose. Additional oral doses of bornaprine resulted in some accumulation in the plasma.

=== Excretion ===
Single oral doses of bornaprine were successfully excreted in urine and feces in rats, dogs, and humans. The following mean excretion rates were also reported during five days for urine and feces: rat 31 and 70%, dog 53 and 39%, and humans 78 and 4%. Excretion was notably prolonged and incomplete at five days in humans, indicating a longer half life and metabolism rate of bornaprine for humans. In human subjects, bornaprine has a half life of approximately 30 hours compared to 5 and 12 hour half lives in rats and dogs, respectively.

=== Metabolites ===
Bornaprine is an epimeric mixture of exo and endo esters, and its major metabolites have been identified and include: three isomers of monohydroxy-N-desthel-sormodren, three isomers of monohydroxy-sormodren and 5-hydroxyl. Each of these metabolites were hydroxylated at either C-5 or C-6 in the bicyclic ring. The activity of each of compounds has been studied extensively and 5-hydroxyl showed similar anticholinergic activity to the parent compound when tested in isolated rat atrium unlike other identified metabolites.

== Availability ==
Bornaprine is currently available under the brand name Sormodren in the following countries: Austria (Abbott Pharmaceuticals), Germany (Abbott), Italy (Teofarma Pharmaceuticals), and Turkey (Abbott). Bornaprine is normally administered in a tablet form, however a recent patent is investigating the effect of several anticholinergic drugs, including bornaprine, in transdermal patches. These patches are not currently available to the public market. Bornaprine is not currently on the market in the United States and its clinical trial status is unknown.

== Treatment ==
=== Parkinson's disease ===
Like many other anticholinergic drugs, bornaprine had been used to treat the symptoms of Parkinson's disease. Bornaprine most effectively treats the tremors associated with Parkinson's and also helps bradykinesia, hypokinesia, and posture and facial expression.

=== Hyperhidrosis ===
Hyperhidrosis occurs in acute phase of spinal cord injured patients and an effective oral treatment for hyperhidrosis has yet to be perfected. A recent study done with patients with medullary lesions found bornaprine to be very effective in decreasing the amount of sweating in patients with minimal side-effects. Bornaprine is now commonly prescribed for treating hyperhidrosis in Europe.

=== Sleep ===
When administered to healthy humans, bornaprine suppressed the amount of REM sleep, suggesting that the M1 and M2 receptors are involved in sleep increase and REM latency. This also suggests that bornaprine may be able to be used as a sleep aid in the future.

== Side effects ==
Since bornaprine is a potent anticholinergic drug, it has a similar side effect profile to other anticholinergic drugs, including dry mouth and constipation. Additionally, when bornaprine was administered to patients with secondary parkinsonism, few patients reported transient confusion.

== Toxicity ==
LD_{50} tests performed on rodents revealed that 26 mg/kg intravenously and 112 mg/kg subcutaneously administered amounts of bornaprine were toxic. Subcutaneous application resulted in ataxia, spastic paralysis, and convulsions.

== Synthesis ==
Bornaprine can be synthesized beginning with atropic acid (2-phenyl acrylic acid, 1). A Diels-Alder reaction with cyclopentadiene (2) gives the bicyclic compound 3. Catalytic hydrogenation over Raney nickel gives 2-phenylbicyclo[2.2.1]heptane-2-carboxylic acid (5). Conversion of the acid to the acid chloride and esterification with 3-diethylaminopropanol (4) completes the synthesis of bornaprine (6).

Synthesis of bornaprine
