= Pramipexole/ondansetron =

Combination drug formulation

Combination of
- Pramipexole: Dopamine D_{2}-like receptor agonist
- Ondansetron: Serotonin 5-HT_{3} receptor antagonist

Clinical data
- Other names: Ondansetron/pramipexole; ALTO-207; ALTO207; CTC-501; CTC501

Pramipexole/ondansetron, also known by its developmental code name ALTO-207 and formerly as CTC-501, is a combination of pramipexole, a dopamine D_{2}-like receptor agonist, and ondansetron, a serotonin 5-HT_{3} receptor antagonist, which is under development for treatment-resistant major depressive disorder (TRD or MDD). The inclusion of ondansetron is to reduce the side effects of pramipexole like nausea and vomiting in order to allow for higher doses of pramipexole that may be more effective for treatment of depression as well as more rapid upward titration of pramipexole dosage. The drug was originated by Chase Therapeutics and is being developed by Alto Neuroscience. As of March 2026, it is in phase 2 clinical trials for MDD.

== See also ==
- List of investigational antidepressants
