= Dipropyldopamine =

Clinical data
- Other names: DPDA; N,N-Di-n-propyldopamine; N,N-Dipropyldopamine; N,N-Di-n-propyl-DA; N,N-Dipropyl-DA
- Drug class: Dopamine receptor agonist; Dopamine D_{1} and D_{2}-like receptor agonist
- ATC code: None

Identifiers
- IUPAC name: 4-[2-(dipropylamino)ethyl]benzene-1,2-diol
- CAS Number: 66185-61-3
- PubChem CID: 3106
- ChemSpider: 2995
- UNII: CP598ZU72P
- ChEBI: CHEBI:93446
- ChEMBL: ChEMBL15564
- CompTox Dashboard (EPA): DTXSID50216371

Chemical and physical data
- Formula: C_{14}H_{23}NO_{2}
- Molar mass: 237.343 g·mol^{−1}
- 3D model (JSmol): Interactive image
- SMILES: CCCN(CCC)CCC1=CC(=C(C=C1)O)O
- InChI: InChI=1S/C14H23NO2/c1-3-8-15(9-4-2)10-7-12-5-6-13(16)14(17)11-12/h5-6,11,16-17H,3-4,7-10H2,1-2H3; Key:LMYSNFBROWBKMB-UHFFFAOYSA-N

Dipropyldopamine (DPDA), also known as N,N-di-n-propyldopamine, is a synthetic dopamine receptor agonist related to the catecholamine neurotransmitter dopamine which has been used in scientific research. It is a dual agonist of both dopamine D_{1}-like and D_{2}-like receptors, with much greater potency at dopamine D_{2} receptors than dopamine itself. Unlike dopamine, the drug lacks β-adrenergic receptor activity and also has weaker vasoconstrictor effects.

DPDA produces hypolocomotion across a wide range of doses in rodents. It modestly reduces climbing behavior at low doses and markedly enhances it at much high doses. The drug is thought to be resistant to metabolism by monoamine oxidase (MAO) but to still be susceptible to metabolism by catechol O-methyltransferase (COMT). It was virtually inactive orally in rodents. In contrast to dopamine, which is peripherally selective, DPDA can cross the blood–brain barrier and produce effects in the central nervous system.

DPDA was first described in the scientific literature by 1977. Other N,N-dialkyl derivatives of dopamine besides DPDA have been studied. In addition, esters of DPDA have been developed and studied.

== See also ==
- Catecholamine
- DPAI
