= Mazaticol =

Chemical compound

Clinical data
- Routes of administration: Oral
- ATC code: N04AA10 (WHO)

Legal status
- Legal status: In general: uncontrolled

Identifiers
- IUPAC name: [(1R,3R,5R)-6,6,9-trimethyl-9-azabicyclo[3.3.1]non-3-yl hydroxy(di-2-thienyl)acetate
- CAS Number: 42024-98-6
- PubChem CID: 68667
- ChemSpider: 61921
- UNII: I6X824OGWZ
- CompTox Dashboard (EPA): DTXSID1057743

Chemical and physical data
- Formula: C_{21}H_{27}NO_{3}S_{2}
- Molar mass: 405.57 g·mol^{−1}
- 3D model (JSmol): Interactive image
- SMILES: CC1(CC[C@@H]2C[C@H](C[C@H]1N2C)OC(=O)C(c3cccs3)(c4cccs4)O)C
- InChI: InChI=1S/C21H27NO3S2/c1-20(2)9-8-14-12-15(13-16(20)22(14)3)25-19(23)21(24,17-6-4-10-26-17)18-7-5-11-27-18/h4-7,10-11,14-16,24H,8-9,12-13H2,1-3H3/t14-,15-,16-/m1/s1; Key:AMHPTVWBZSYFSS-BZUAXINKSA-N

Mazaticol (Pentona) is an anticholinergic used as an antiparkinsonian agent in Japan.

The compound was known as PG-501 is first mentioned in Japanese studies in the early 1970s, noting "PG-501 was found to have pronounced anti-acetylcholine, anti-tremorine-induced tremor, anti-physostigmine-induced death, anti-haloperidol-induced parkinsonism and anti EEG arousal activities."
