= 7-Hydroxyropinirole =

Clinical data
- Other names: SK&F-89124; SKF-89124; SK&F89124; SKF89124; SK&F-89,124; SKF-89,124; SKF-89124A
- Drug class: Dopamine receptor agonist; Dopamine D_{2}-like receptor agonist
- ATC code: None

Identifiers
- IUPAC name: 4-[2-(dipropylamino)ethyl]-7-hydroxy-1,3-dihydroindol-2-one
- CAS Number: 81654-62-8
- PubChem CID: 133741
- ChemSpider: 117961
- UNII: 9LD7EVH3Y5
- ChEMBL: ChEMBL587
- CompTox Dashboard (EPA): DTXSID60231232

Chemical and physical data
- Formula: C_{16}H_{24}N_{2}O_{2}
- Molar mass: 276.380 g·mol^{−1}
- 3D model (JSmol): Interactive image
- SMILES: CCCN(CCC)CCC1=C2CC(=O)NC2=C(C=C1)O
- InChI: InChI=1S/C16H24N2O2/c1-3-8-18(9-4-2)10-7-12-5-6-14(19)16-13(12)11-15(20)17-16/h5-6,19H,3-4,7-11H2,1-2H3,(H,17,20); Key:PVIICBUWKXYFAA-UHFFFAOYSA-N

7-Hydroxyropinirole (developmental code name SK&F-89124 or SKF-89124) is a dopamine receptor agonist and active metabolite of the antiparkinsonian agent ropinirole (SK&F-101468). It is a major metabolite of ropinirole in rats and dogs but a minor metabolite in mice, monkeys, and humans. In humans, 7-hydroxyropinirole accounts for less than 5% of a dose of ropinirole. Its involvement in ropinirole's effects in humans is unknown.

The drug is described as a highly potent and highly selective dopamine D_{2}-like receptor agonist. It has been reported to be 30-fold more potent than ropinirole as a dopamine D_{2} receptor agonist in vitro. However, ropinirole and 7-hydroxyropinirole were equipotent in terms of antiparkinsonian activity in rodents in vivo.

7-Hydroxyropinirole is said to be rapidly glucuronidated in humans. In addition, 7-hydroxyropinirole has reduced capacity to cross the blood–brain barrier than ropinirole. This is due to its hydroxyl group, which increases it polarity and reduces its lipophilicity. The log P of ropinirole is 2.46, whereas that of 7-hydroxyropinirole is 2.17.

7-Hydroxyropinirole was first described in the scientific literature by 1983. Subsequently, ropinirole was described in 1985.

== See also ==
- Partial ergoline
- 14-Hydroxy-LSD
- Lergotrile
