= Dexetimide =

Chemical compound

Clinical data
- AHFS/Drugs.com: International Drug Names
- ATC code: N04AA08 (WHO)

Legal status
- Legal status: BR: Class C1 (Other controlled substances)

Identifiers
- IUPAC name: 3-(1-benzyl-4-piperidyl)-3-phenylpiperidine-2,6-dione
- CAS Number: 21888-98-2
- PubChem CID: 30843
- IUPHAR/BPS: 354
- DrugBank: DB08997
- ChemSpider: 28615
- UNII: 43477QYX3D
- KEGG: D03711
- ChEMBL: ChEMBL1908364
- CompTox Dashboard (EPA): DTXSID701043218

Chemical and physical data
- Formula: C_{23}H_{26}N_{2}O_{2}
- Molar mass: 362.473 g·mol^{−1}
- 3D model (JSmol): Interactive image
- SMILES: O=C2NC(=O)CCC2(c1ccccc1)C4CCN(Cc3ccccc3)CC4
- InChI: InChI=1S/C23H26N2O2/c26-21-11-14-23(22(27)24-21,19-9-5-2-6-10-19)20-12-15-25(16-13-20)17-18-7-3-1-4-8-18/h1-10,20H,11-17H2,(H,24,26,27)/t23-/m1/s1; Key:LQQIVYSCPWCSSD-HSZRJFAPSA-N

Dexetimide (brand name Tremblex) is a piperidine anticholinergic. It is a muscarinic antagonist that is used to treat drug induced parkinsonism. Dexetimide was discovered at Janssen Pharmaceutica in 1968.
