= Etybenzatropine =

Chemical compound

Clinical data
- Routes of administration: Oral, IM, IV
- ATC code: N04AC30 (WHO)

Identifiers
- IUPAC name: (3-endo)-3-(Diphenylmethoxy)-8-ethyl-8-azabicyclo[3.2.1]octane
- CAS Number: 524-83-4
- PubChem CID: 71637
- ChemSpider: 16736129
- UNII: G1X2X9N95N
- KEGG: D04087
- CompTox Dashboard (EPA): DTXSID50905096

Chemical and physical data
- Formula: C_{22}H_{27}NO
- Molar mass: 321.464 g·mol^{−1}
- 3D model (JSmol): Interactive image
- SMILES: CCN1[C@@H]2CC[C@H]1C[C@H](C2)OC(c3ccccc3)c4ccccc4
- InChI: InChI=1S/C22H27NO/c1-2-23-19-13-14-20(23)16-21(15-19)24-22(17-9-5-3-6-10-17)18-11-7-4-8-12-18/h3-12,19-22H,2,13-16H2,1H3/t19-,20+,21+; Key:PHTMLLGDZBZXMW-AERCQKQUSA-N

Etybenzatropine

Clinical data
- Other names: Ethybenztropine, Tropethydrylin, Panolid, Ponalid, Ponalide
- Routes of administration: Oral, IM, IV
- ATC code: N04AC30 (WHO)

Identifiers
- IUPAC name: (1R,5S)-3-benzhydryloxy-8-ethyl-8-azabicyclo[3.2.1]octane
- CAS Number: 524-83-4
- PubChem CID: 71637
- DrugBank: DB13468
- ChemSpider: 16736129
- UNII: G1X2X9N95N
- KEGG: D04087
- ChEBI: CHEBI:135972
- ChEMBL: ChEMBL2104273
- CompTox Dashboard (EPA): DTXSID50905096

Chemical and physical data
- Formula: C_{22}H_{27}NO
- Molar mass: 321.464 g·mol^{−1}
- 3D model (JSmol): Interactive image
- SMILES: CCN1[C@@H]2CC[C@H]1CC(C2)OC(C3=CC=CC=C3)C4=CC=CC=C4
- InChI: InChI=1S/C22H27NO/c1-2-23-19-13-14-20(23)16-21(15-19)24-22(17-9-5-3-6-10-17)18-11-7-4-8-12-18/h3-12,19-22H,2,13-16H2,1H3/t19-,20+,21?; Key:PHTMLLGDZBZXMW-WCRBZPEASA-N

Etybenzatropine (INN), also known as ethybenztropine (USAN, BAN) and tropethydrylin, is an anticholinergic /antihistamine marketed under the trade names Panolid, Ponalid, and Ponalide, which is used as an antiparkinsonian agent. Like its analogue benzatropine, it may act as a dopamine reuptake inhibitor.

== See also ==
- Benzatropine
