= Dopamine therapy =

- Specialty: Neurology

Dopamine therapy is the regulation of levels of the neurotransmitter dopamine through the use of either agonists, or antagonists; and has been used in the treatment of disorders characterized by a dopamine imbalance. Dopamine replacement therapy (DRT) is an effective treatment for patients with decreased levels of dopamine. Often dopamine antagonists, compounds that activate dopamine receptors in the absence of that receptor's physiological ligand, the neurotransmitter dopamine, are used in this therapy. DRT has been shown to reduce symptoms and increase lifespan for patients with Parkinson's disease. Dopamine regulation plays a critical role in human mental and physical health. The neurons that contain the neurotransmitter are clustered in the midbrain region in an area called the substantia nigra. In Parkinson's patients, the death of dopamine-transmitting neurons in this area leads to abnormal nerve-firing patterns that cause motor problems. Research in patients with schizophrenia indicates abnormalities in dopamine receptor structure and function.

== Dopamine replacement therapy in Parkinson's disease ==
DRT has been used to improve motor skills, impulsivity, and decision making in Parkinson's patients. In Parkinson's disease patients, dopamine deficiencies can be seen in two key areas of the brain: the dorsal frontostriatal circuit, the area responsible for motor skills and task-switching, and the ventral frontostriatal circuit, the area responsible for impulsivity. Impairment in these areas can be treated with dopamine agonists, a group of medications that mimics the ligand dopamine and bonds to dopamine receptors. Other medications that convert into dopamine, as opposed to functioning as dopamine analogs, alleviate the effects of the degeneration of dopamine-producing neurons. One dopamine precursor, Levodopa, was the first drug approved specifically for Parkinson's disease. DRT increases dopamine in the brain to optimal levels in order to return motor skills, impulsivity, and decision making to normal function. Although DRT can improve motor skills and decision making in patients with mild to severe Parkinson's disease, an overdose of dopamine is associated with impaired impulsivity (see next section).

== The overdose hypothesis ==
Dopamine deficiency is more severe in the dorsal frontostriatal circuit than in the ventral frontostriatal circuit. However, DRT does not target these areas differently, and delivers the same amount of dopamine to both areas of the brain. DRT medication can increase dopamine in the dorsal frontostriatal circuit to an optimal level, leading to an improvement in task-switching activities and working memory. Simultaneously, the ventral frontostriatal circuit will experience an overdose of dopamine that will lead to increased impulsive behavior. Problems controlling impulsivity due to DRT drugs have been shown to induce impulsive forms of behavior, such as compulsive gambling. Although DRT drugs can worsen impulse control, a lack of DRT drugs does not necessarily result in better impulse control. Levels of improvement depend on the severity of psychiatric disorder.

== Early studies of dopamine therapy in schizophrenia ==
In patients with schizophrenia, evidence indicates abnormal dopamine receptor D2 structure, as well as a reduced link between dopamine receptor D1 and receptor D2. Studies have shown that targeting the D1 receptors in the prefrontal cortex can improve the cognitive functioning of schizophrenic patients. However, adverse effects of dopamine therapy may occur, including difficulty with impulse control. More research is needed to fully understand the effects of dopamine therapy in patients with schizophrenia.
