= DPAI =

Clinical data
- Other names: 4-(N,N-Dipropylaminoethyl)indole; 4-DPAEI; 2-Desoxo-2-ene-ropinirole; BD-179; BD179
- Drug class: Dopamine receptor agonist; Prolactin inhibitor
- ATC code: None

Identifiers
- IUPAC name: N-[2-(1H-indol-4-yl)ethyl]-N-propylpropan-1-amine
- CAS Number: 76149-15-0
- PubChem CID: 3086054
- ChemSpider: 2342766
- ChEMBL: ChEMBL67040
- CompTox Dashboard (EPA): DTXSID10227004

Chemical and physical data
- Formula: C_{16}H_{24}N_{2}
- Molar mass: 244.382 g·mol^{−1}
- 3D model (JSmol): Interactive image
- SMILES: CCCN(CCC)CCC1=C2C=CNC2=CC=C1
- InChI: InChI=1S/C16H24N2/c1-3-11-18(12-4-2)13-9-14-6-5-7-16-15(14)8-10-17-16/h5-8,10,17H,3-4,9,11-13H2,1-2H3; Key:AFRBPRLOPBAGCM-UHFFFAOYSA-N

DPAI, also known as 4-(N,N-dipropylaminoethyl)indole (4-DPAEI), 2-desoxo-2-ene-ropinirole, or BD-179, is a dopamine receptor agonist and partial ergoline closely related to the clinically used dopamine receptor agonist and antiparkinsonian agent ropinirole.

It has a delayed onset of effects and weak actions in vitro, suggestive that it may be a metabolically activated prodrug via 6-hydroxylation into its metabolite 6-HO-DPAI (TL-350). The drug is said to be a highly selective agonist of presynaptic dopamine autoreceptors, with little or no activity at postsynaptic dopamine receptors. It dramatically reduces dopamine release in the caudate nucleus, produces hypolocomotion, and strongly suppresses prolactin secretion in rodents. No effects of DPAI on serotonin receptors have been reported, at least as of 1982.

DPAI was first described in the scientific literature by 1980. It was developed independently by David E. Nichols and colleagues and by another group of researchers. Analogues of DPAI in which its propyl groups have been replaced with other alkyl groups such as methyl or ethyl groups, for instance DMAI (BD-214; UCD0076), have also been studied.

Chemical structures of DPAI and analogues
DPAI

Ropinirole

LSD

== See also ==
- Partial ergoline
- Dipropyltryptamine (DPT)
- Dipropyldopamine (DPDA)
- Diaza-2C-DFLY
