= Pramipexole =

Dopamine agonist medication

- Skeletal structure of pramipexole

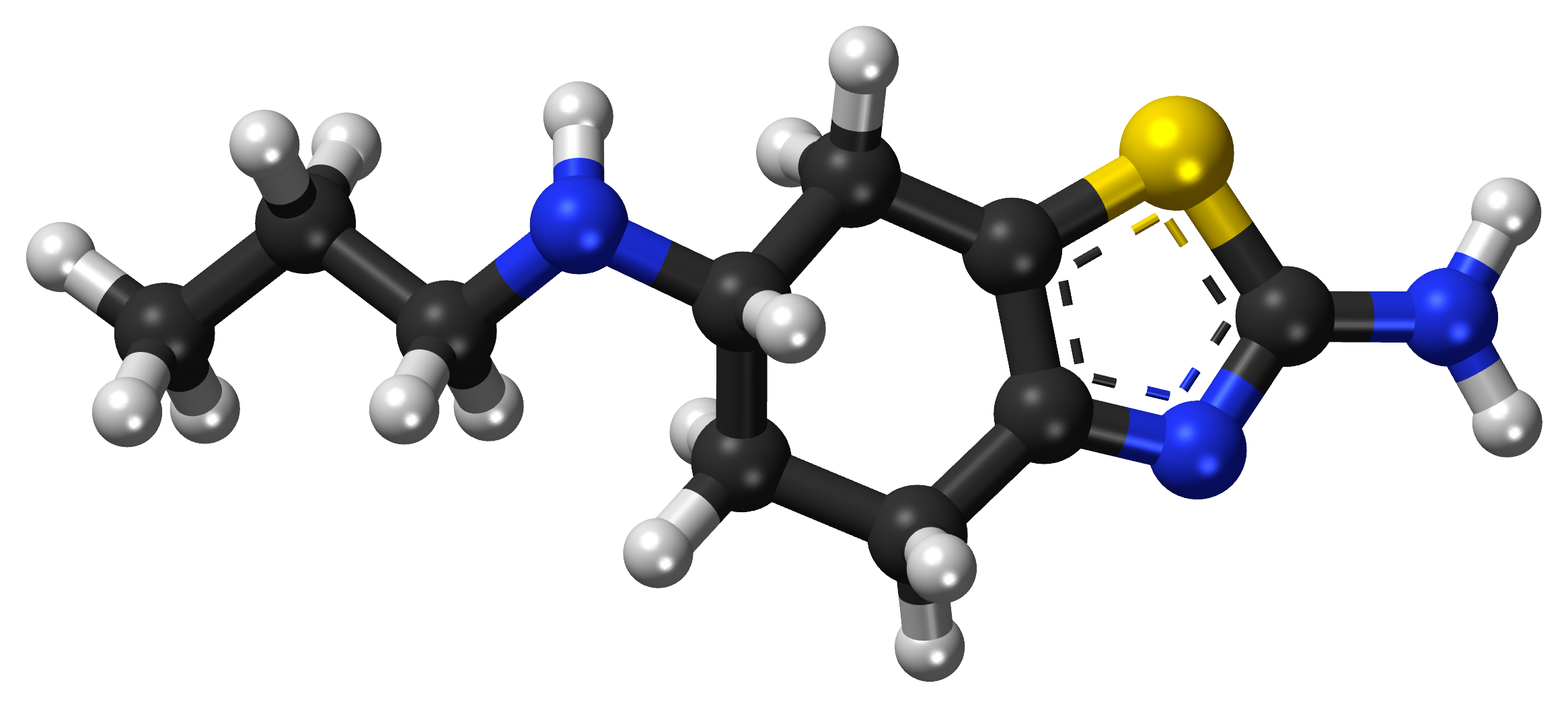
- 3D representation of a pramipexole molecule

Clinical data
- Pronunciation: /ˌpræmɪˈpɛksoʊl/
- Trade names: Mirapex, Mirapexin, Sifrol, others
- AHFS/Drugs.com: Monograph
- MedlinePlus: a697029
- License data: US DailyMed: Pramipexole
- Pregnancy category: AU: B3
- Routes of administration: By mouth
- Drug class: Dopamine receptor agonist; Dopamine D_{2}-like receptor agonist; Antiparkinsonian agent
- ATC code: N04BC05 (WHO)

Legal status
- Legal status: BR: Class C1 (Other controlled substances); CA: ℞-only; US: ℞-only; EU: Rx-only; In general: ℞ (Prescription only)

Pharmacokinetic data
- Bioavailability: >90%
- Protein binding: 15%
- Elimination half-life: 8–12 hours
- Excretion: Urine (90%), feces (2%)

Identifiers
- IUPAC name: (S)-N ^{6}-propyl-4,5,6,7-tetrahydro-1,3-benzothiazole-2,6-diamine
- CAS Number: 104632-26-0
- PubChem CID: 119570
- IUPHAR/BPS: 953
- DrugBank: DB00413
- ChemSpider: 106770
- UNII: 83619PEU5T
- KEGG: D05575; as salt: D00559
- ChEBI: CHEBI:8356
- ChEMBL: ChEMBL301265
- PDB ligand: G6L (PDBe, RCSB PDB)
- CompTox Dashboard (EPA): DTXSID6023496
- ECHA InfoCard: 100.124.761

Chemical and physical data
- Formula: C_{10}H_{17}N_{3}S
- Molar mass: 211.33 g·mol^{−1}
- 3D model (JSmol): Interactive image
- SMILES: n1c2c(sc1N)C[C@@H](NCCC)CC2
- InChI: InChI=1S/C10H17N3S/c1-2-5-12-7-3-4-8-9(6-7)14-10(11)13-8/h7,12H,2-6H2,1H3,(H2,11,13)/t7-/m0/s1; Key:FASDKYOPVNHBLU-ZETCQYMHSA-N

Pramipexole, sold under the brand Mirapex among others, is a medication used to treat Parkinson's disease and restless legs syndrome. In Parkinson's disease it may be used alone or together with levodopa. It is taken by mouth. Pramipexole is a dopamine agonist of the non-ergoline class.

Pramipexole was approved for medical use in the United States in 1997 and was first manufactured by Pharmacia and Upjohn. It is available as a generic medication. In 2023, it was the 201st most commonly prescribed medication in the United States, with more than 2 million prescriptions.

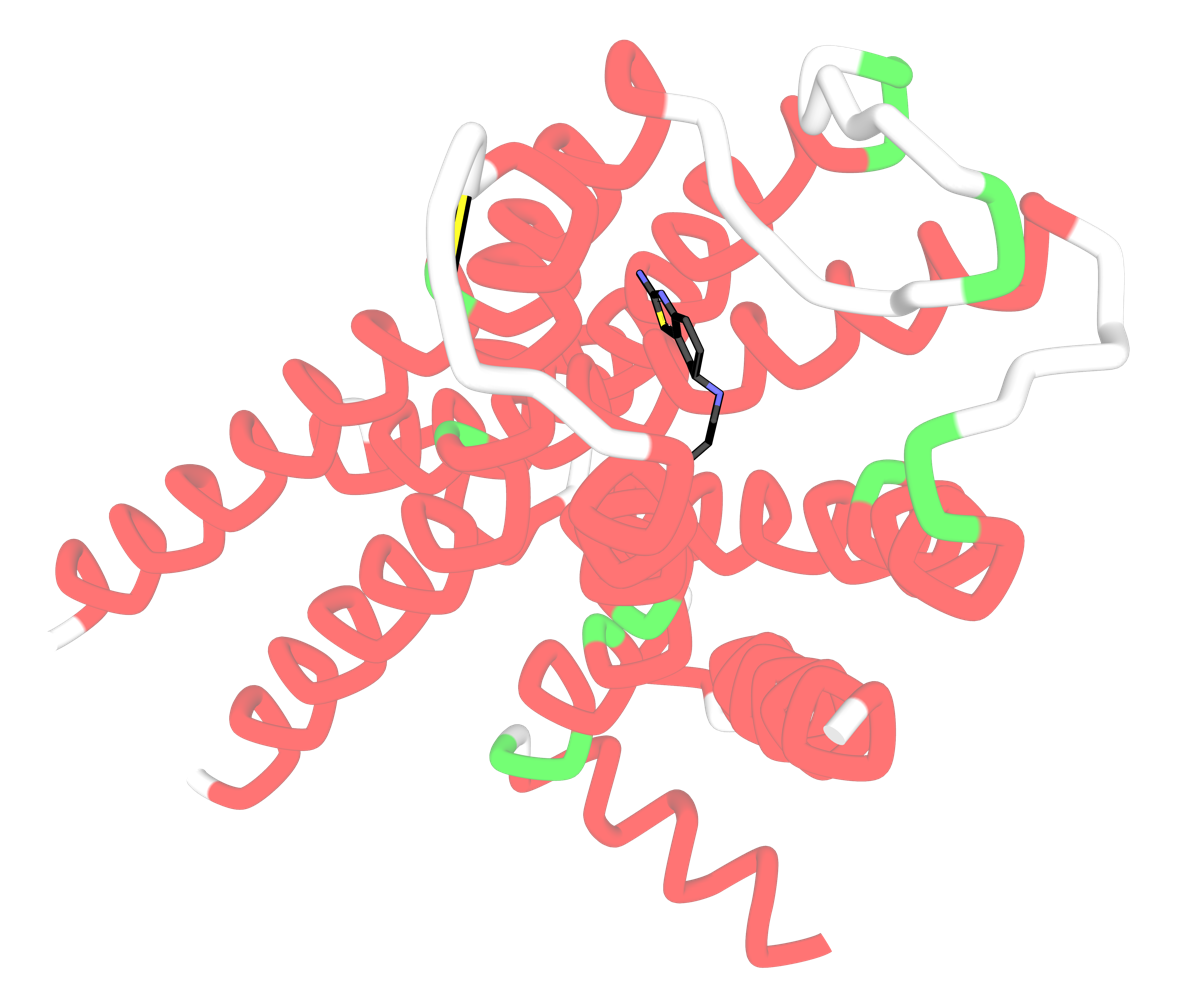
Pramipexole bound to the dopamine D3 receptor

== Medical uses ==
Pramipexole is used in the treatment of Parkinson's disease and restless legs syndrome. Safety in pregnancy and breastfeeding is unknown.

A 2008 meta-analysis found that pramipexole was more effective than ropinirole in the treatment of restless legs syndrome.

It is occasionally prescribed off-label for depression. Its effectiveness as an antidepressant may be a product of its strong partial agonistic activity on and preferential occupation of dopamine D_{3} receptors at low doses (see table below); as well, the drug has been shown to desensitize the inhibitory D_{2} autoreceptors but not the postsynaptic D_{2} receptors, leading to an increase in dopamine and serotonin levels in the prefrontal cortex. Chronic administration of pramipexole may also result in desensitization of D_{3} autoreceptors, leading to reduced dopamine transporter function. Trials have shown mixed results for depression.

Pramipexole has also been used as a treatment for REM sleep behavior disorder, but it is not licensed for use in this disorder. Observational studies suggest it may reduce the frequency and intensity of REM sleep behavior disorder symptoms, but randomized controlled trials have not been performed, so the evidence for its role in this disorder is weak.

== Side effects ==
Common side effects of pramipexole include:

- Headache
- Peripheral edema
- Hyperalgesia (body aches and pains)
- Nausea and vomiting
- Sedation and somnolence
- Decreased appetite and subsequent weight loss
- Orthostatic hypotension (resulting in dizziness, lightheadedness, and possibly fainting, especially when standing up)
- Insomnia
- Hallucinations (seeing, hearing, smelling, tasting or feeling things that are not there), amnesia and confusion
- Twitching, twisting, or other unusual body movements
- Unusual tiredness or weakness
- Pramipexole (and related D_{3}-preferring dopamine agonist medications such as ropinirole) can induce "impulsive–compulsive spectrum disorders" such as compulsive gambling, punding, hypersexuality, and overeating, even in people without any prior history of these behaviors. There have also been reported detrimental side effects related to impulse-control disorders resulting from off-label use of pramipexole or other dopamine agonists in treating clinical depression. The incidence and severity of impulse-control disorders for those taking the drug for depression are not fully understood because the drug has not been approved for the treatment of depression and the first major studies of its efficacy in treating anhedonic depression were conducted in 2022. There have been anecdotal reports of abrupt and severe personality changes related to impulsivity and loss of self-control in a minority of patients regardless of the condition being treated, although the incidence of these side effects is not yet fully known.
- Augmentation: (Note: The term "augmentation" has different meanings depending on the context. In the context of the pharmacological management of psychiatric disorders, for example, it means enhancing treatment effects by adding a second drug (or other treatment intervention). In the present context, augmentation has the meaning given above (in the body of the article).) Especially when used to treat restless legs syndrome, long-term pramipexole treatment may exhibit drug augmentation, which is "an iatrogenic worsening of [restless legs syndrome] symptoms following treatment with dopaminergic agents" and may include an earlier onset of symptoms during the day or a generalized increase in symptoms.

== Pharmacology ==
The activity profile of pramipexole at various sites has been characterized as follows:

Activities of pramipexole at various sites
Site	Affinity (K_{i}, nM)	Efficacy (E_{max}, %)	Action
D_{2S}	3.3	99 (130% beta-arrestin)	Full agonist (Gi/o); superagonist (β-arrestin)
D_{2L}	3.9	99 (70% beta-arrestin)	Full agonist (Gi/o); partial agonist (β-arrestin)
D_{3}	0.5	98 (70% beta-arrestin)	Full agonist (Gi/o); partial agonist (β-arrestin)
D_{4}	3.9	91 (42% beta-arrestin)	Full agonist (Gi/o); partial agonist (β-arrestin) [functionally G-protein biased]
Notes: Pramipexole also possesses lower affinity (500–10,000 nM) for the 5-HT_{1A}, 5-HT_{1B}, 5-HT_{1D}, and α_{2}-adrenergic receptors. It has negligible affinity (>10,000 nM) for the D_{1}, D_{5}, 5-HT_{2}, α_{1}-adrenergic, β-adrenergic, H_{1}, and mACh receptors. All sites were assayed using human materials. Pramipexole is a superagonist at the presynaptic D2S receptor, S referring to a shorter amino acid sequence commonly found presynaptically, which desensitizes over time unlike postsynaptic D2L (long) receptors.

While pramipexole is used clinically (see below), its D_{3}-preferring receptor binding profile has made it a popular tool compound for preclinical research. For example, pramipexole has been used (in combination with D_{2}- and or D_{3}-preferring antagonists) to discover the role of D_{3} receptor function in rodent models and tasks for neuropsychiatric disorders. Of note, it appears that pramipexole, in addition to having effects on dopamine D_{3} receptors, may also affect mitochondrial function via a mechanism that remains less understood. A pharmacological approach to separate dopaminergic from non-dopaminergic (e.g. mitochondrial) effects of pramipexole has been to study the effects of the R-stereoisomer of pramipexole (which has much lower affinity to the dopamine receptors when compared to the S-isomer) side by side with the effects of the S-isomer. This property can be characterised using dopaminergic activity equivalent (a relative measure comparing doses of different doses of stereoisomers in mg).

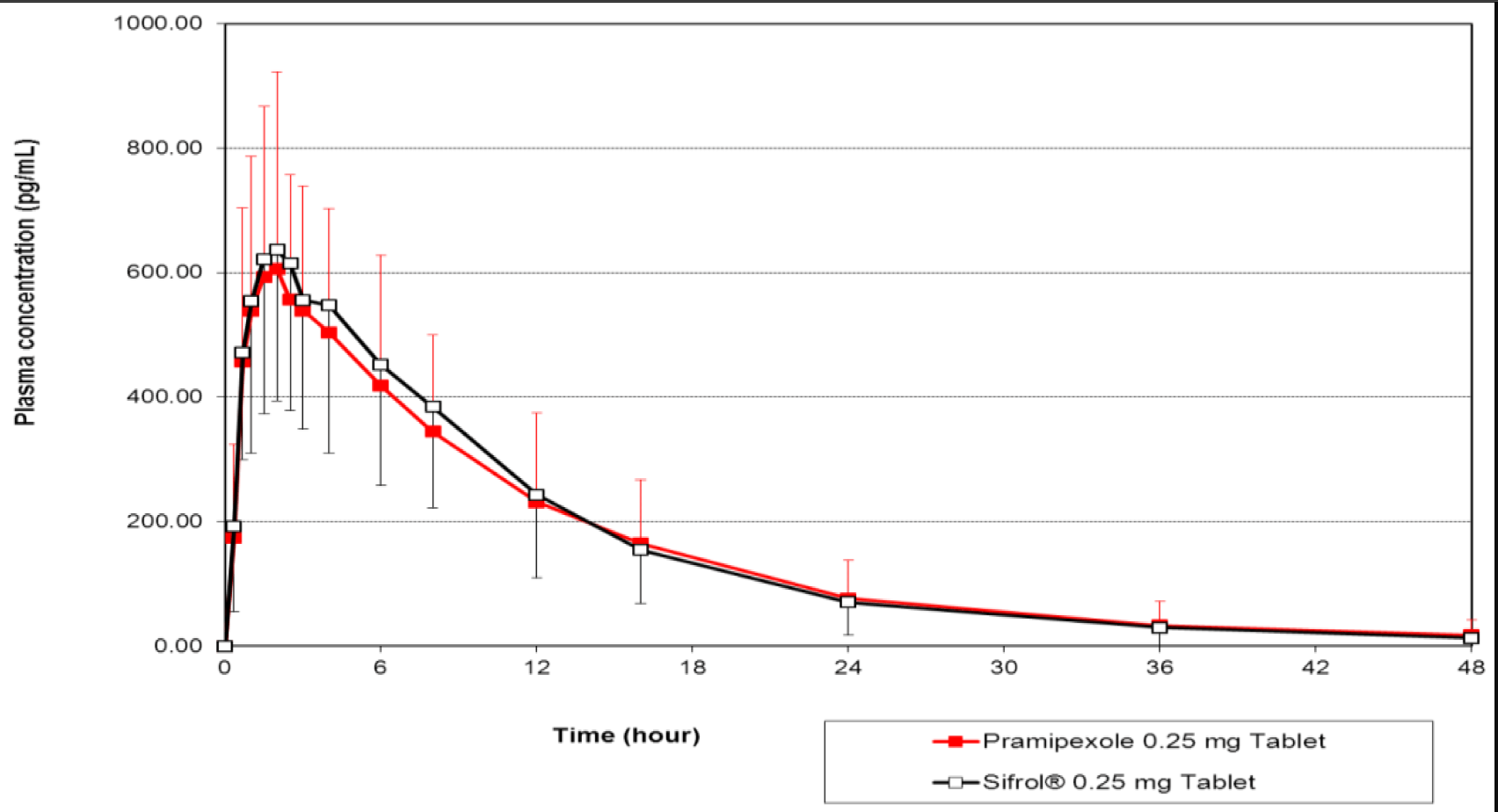
Plasma concentration of 0.25 mg PO after a single dose

Parkinson's disease is a neurodegenerative disease affecting the substantia nigra, a component of the basal ganglia. The substantia nigra has a high quantity of dopaminergic neurons, which are nerve cells that release the neurotransmitter known as dopamine. When dopamine is released, it may activate dopamine receptors in the striatum, which is another component of the basal ganglia. When neurons of the substantia nigra deteriorate in Parkinson's disease, the striatum no longer properly receives dopamine signals. As a result, the basal ganglia can no longer regulate body movement effectively and motor function becomes impaired. By acting as an agonist for the D_{2}, D_{3}, and D_{4} dopamine receptors, pramipexole may directly stimulate the underfunctioning dopamine receptors in the striatum, thereby restoring the dopamine signals needed for proper functioning of the basal ganglia.

Pramipexole can increase growth hormone indirectly through its inhibition of somatostatin. Pramipexole has also been shown to be protective against dopaminergic-related methamphetamine neurotoxicity.

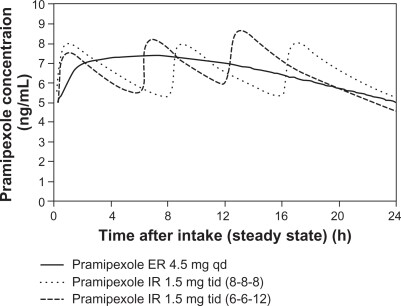
Plasma concentration of Mirapex and Mirapex ER at steady-state

Immediate-release pramipexole displays a T_{max} of approximately 2 hours and 3 hours if taken with a high-fat meal. Extended-release pramipexole displays a T_{max} of ~6 hours and ~8 hours if taken with food. The AUC of pramipexole remains unaltered regardless of food presence. Steady-state is achieved within 3 days and 5 days for the IR and ER formulations, respectively. Pramipexole is eliminated via the renal organic cation transporter as an unchanged drug showing no signs of any metabolism. Pramipexole has been shown to inhibit CYP2D6 with a K_{i} of 30μM which is significantly higher than the maximum approved dosage of 4.5mg/day thus any enzyme-mediated drug interactions are not clinically relevant. It comes in strengths of 0.125mg, 0.25mg, 0.5mg, 1mg, and 1.5mg instant release; the extended-release comes in 0.375mg, 0.75mg, 1.5mg, 2.25mg, 3mg, 3.75mg, and 4.5mg. The instant release is meant to be dosed three times daily for Parkinson's and once two hours before bedtime for restless leg syndrome. The extended-release is not approved for restless leg syndrome. It is not metabolized, with >90% of the dose excreted unchanged via SCL22A2/OCT2. Therefore, inhibitors of the renal organic cation transporter system (e.g., cimetidine ) will increase the area under the curve$\infty$ by 50% and increase the t_{1/2} by 40%.

== Chemistry ==
=== Synthesis ===
4-Acetamidocyclohexanone (1) is reacted with bromine, yielding 2-bromo-4-acetamidocyclohexanone (2). Then, 2 reacts with thiourea, giving compound 3. Through reaction with hydrogen bromide (HBr), the amide is converted into a primary amine (compound 4), which then reacts with diethyl mesoxalate and diborane (B_{2}H_{6}), yielding pramipexole (5).

Synthesis of pramipexole

=== Analogues ===
Derivatives of pramipexole include CJ-998, CJ-1037, CJ-1638, CJ-1639, D-264, D-440, and D-512.

Some analogues of pramipexole include etrabamine and talipexole. Another notable analogue of pramipexole is matsupexole.

== Society and culture ==
=== Brand names ===
Brand names include Mirapex, Mirapex ER, Mirapexin, Sifrol, Pexola, Pipexus, Glepark, Oprymea, Astepen, Calmolan, Erimexol, Ezaprev, Frodix, Galipeks, Labrixile, Mariprax, Medopexol, Mepimer, Minergi, Miparkan, Miraper, Miviren, Nulipar, Pacto, Panarak, Parim, Parixol, Parkipex, Parkyn, Parmital, Parpex, Pexa XR, Peximyr, Pexopar, Pisa, Portiv, Pradose, Pramigen, Pramipexin, Pramirol, Pramithon, Pranow, Prapex, Quera LP, Rampiex, Ramixole, Rapexole, Ritmorest, Axalanz, Biopsol, Derinik, Elderpat, Intaxel, Mirapapkin, Mirapezol, Movial, Muvend, Nervius, Neurosomat, Newmirex, Noxopran, Nulipar, Oxpola, Parmital, Periamid, Pralexan, Pramexol, Pramifer, Pramifrol, Pramiola, Pramip, Pramitrem, Primizol, Ramipex, Rapexole, Simipex, Simpral, Stabil, Treminel, Trimexol, X-Tremble.

== Research ==
=== Further Parkinson's disease symptoms treatment ===
Parkinson's disease, apart from motor symptoms, is associated with chronic pain, which is mediated through three different mechanisms: nociception, neuropathy and nociplasty. In animal models, it was shown that pramipexole alleviates allodynia and hyperalgesia caused by excessive glial cell (astrocytes, microglia) activation in the spinal cord, which is the causative effect of Parkinson's disease-related nociceptive pain. Pramipexole appears to exert this effect through its anti-inflammatory effect by inhibiting the release of several pro-inflammatory cytokines (TNF-α, IL-1β, IL-6, IL-8, IL-12 and IL-18). and NF-κB.

=== Cerebral ischemia and reperfusion injury ===
Pramipexole in combination with levodopa was shown to alleviate neurological repercussions, improve neuron morphology and their survival after cerebral ischemia-related reperfusion injury through ferroptosis inhibition (via Nrf2/GPX4/SLC7A11 pathway) or by mitochondrial membrane potential stabilization.

=== Traumatic brain injury ===
After traumatic brain injury, neurons can undergo necroptosis via necrosome formation and RIPK1 pathway. Pramipexole was shown to act as a neuroprotective agent by inducing hypothermia.

=== Psychiatry ===
Pramipexole has been evaluated for the treatment of sexual dysfunction experienced by some users of selective serotonin reuptake inhibitors. It has shown effects on pilot studies in a placebo-controlled proof of concept study in bipolar disorder. It is also being investigated for the treatment of clinical depression, including neuroinflammatory subtypes via NLRP3 inflammasome pathway.

=== Other indications ===
Pramipexole is under clinical trials for the treatment of fibromyalgia, essential tremor, primary orthostatic tremor ('shaky leg syndrome'), and persistent genital arousal disorder.

== See also ==
- Pramipexole/ondansetron
