= Ropinirole =

Dopamine agonist medication

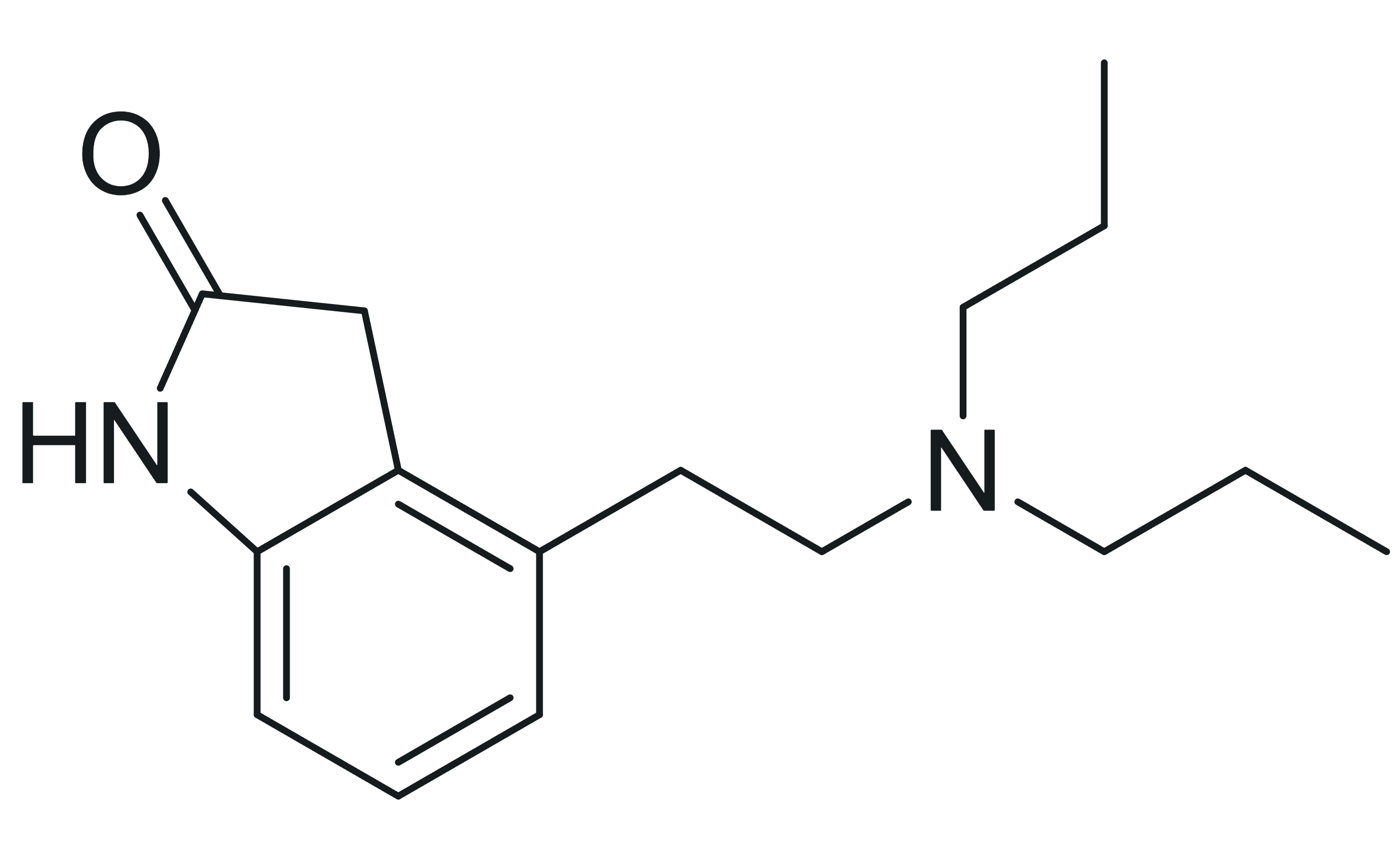

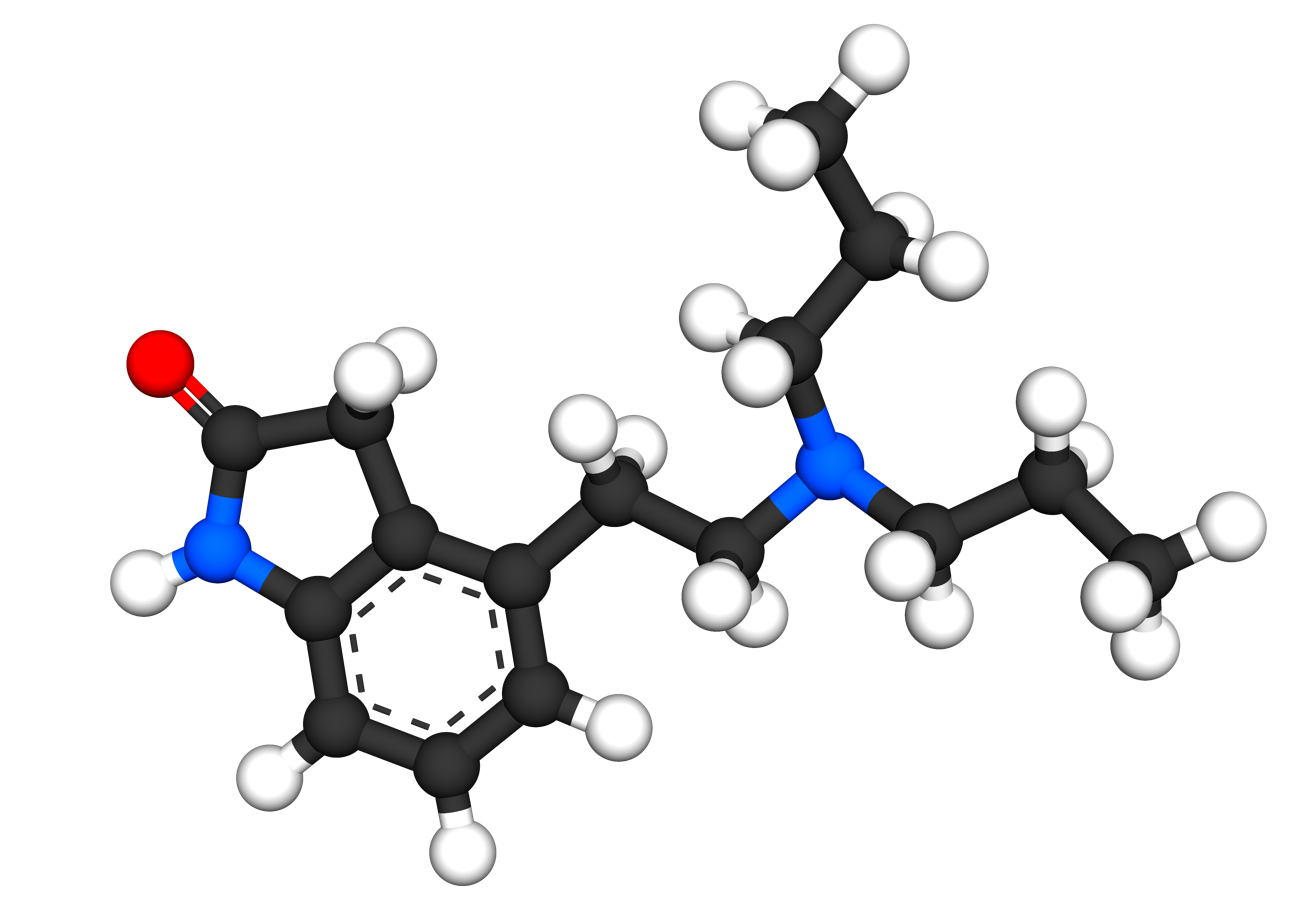

Clinical data
- Trade names: Requip, Repreve, Ronirol, others
- Other names: SK&F-101468; SK&F101468; SKF-101468; SKF101468
- AHFS/Drugs.com: Monograph
- MedlinePlus: a698013
- License data: US DailyMed: Ropinirole
- Routes of administration: By mouth
- ATC code: N04BC04 (WHO) QV03AB96 (WHO)

Legal status
- Legal status: BR: Class C1 (Other controlled substances); US: ℞-only; In general: ℞ (Prescription only)

Pharmacokinetic data
- Bioavailability: 50%
- Metabolism: Liver (CYP1A2)
- Elimination half-life: 5-6 hours

Identifiers
- IUPAC name: 4-[2-(Dipropylamino)ethyl]-1,3-dihydro-2H-indol-2-one
- CAS Number: 91374-21-9
- PubChem CID: 5095
- IUPHAR/BPS: 7295
- DrugBank: DB00268
- ChemSpider: 4916
- UNII: 030PYR8953
- KEGG: D08489
- ChEBI: CHEBI:8888
- ChEMBL: ChEMBL589
- CompTox Dashboard (EPA): DTXSID8045195
- ECHA InfoCard: 100.110.353

Chemical and physical data
- Formula: C_{16}H_{24}N_{2}O
- Molar mass: 260.381 g·mol^{−1}
- 3D model (JSmol): Interactive image
- SMILES: O=C2Nc1cccc(c1C2)CCN(CCC)CCC
- InChI: InChI=1S/C16H24N2O/c1-3-9-18(10-4-2)11-8-13-6-5-7-15-14(13)12-16(19)17-15/h5-7H,3-4,8-12H2,1-2H3,(H,17,19); Key:UHSKFQJFRQCDBE-UHFFFAOYSA-N

Ropinirole, sold under the brand name Requip among others, is a medication used to treat Parkinson's disease (PD) and restless legs syndrome (RLS). It is taken by mouth.

Common side effects include sleepiness, vomiting, and dizziness. Serious side effects may include pathological gambling, hypersexuality, low blood pressure with standing and hallucinations. Use in pregnancy and breastfeeding is of unclear safety. It is a dopamine agonist and works by triggering dopamine D_{2} receptors.

It was approved for medical use in the United States in 1997. It is available as a generic medication. In 2023, it was the 212th most commonly prescribed medication in the United States, with more than 2 million prescriptions.

== Medical uses ==
Ropinirole is prescribed for mainly Parkinson's disease, restless legs syndrome, and extrapyramidal symptoms. It can also reduce the side effects caused by selective serotonin reuptake inhibitors, including Parkinsonism syndrome as well as sexual dysfunction and erectile dysfunction caused by either SSRIs or antipsychotics.

A 2008 meta-analysis found that ropinirole was less effective than pramipexole in the treatment of restless legs syndrome.

== Side effects ==
Ropinirole can cause nausea, dizziness, hallucinations, orthostatic hypotension, and sudden sleep attacks during the daytime. Unusual side effects specific to D_{3} agonists such as ropinirole and pramipexole can include hypersexuality, punding and compulsive gambling, even in patients without a history of these behaviours.

Ropinirole is also known to cause an effect known as "augmentation" when used to treat restless legs syndrome, where over time treatment with dopamine agonists will cause restless legs syndrome symptoms to become more severe. This usually leads to constant dosage increases in an attempt to offset the symptom progression. Symptoms will return to the level of severity they were experienced at before treatment was initiated if the drug is stopped; however, both ropinirole and pramipexole are known to cause painful withdrawal effects when treatment is stopped and the process of taking a patient who has been using the medication long-term off these drugs is often very difficult and should be supervised by a medical professional.

== Pharmacology ==
=== Pharmacodynamics ===
Binding Table
Target	K_{i} (nM)	IA%	Action
D_{1}	>10,000	?	Agonist
D_{2}	3.7	100%	Full Agonist
D_{3}	2.9	97%	Full Agonist
D_{4}	7.8	81%	Partial Agonist
D_{5}	>10,000	?	Agonist

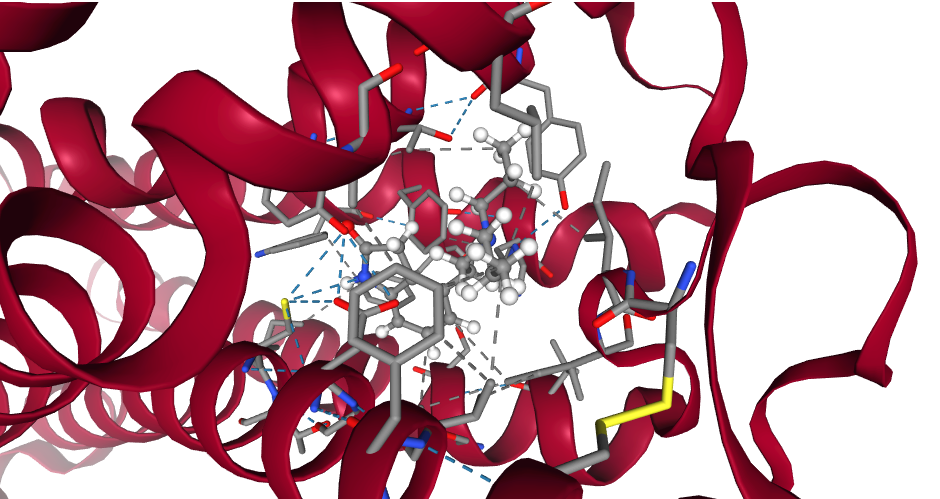
https://doi.org/10.1093/nar/gkae300 https://pubs.acs.org/doi/10.1021/acs.jcim.3c00054 [PDB ID: 8IRS] [Rendered with SwissDrugDesign Software]

Ropinirole acts as a D_{2}, D_{3}, and D_{4} dopamine receptor agonist with highest affinity for D_{3}, which are mostly found in the limbic areas. It is weakly active at the 5-HT_{2}, and α_{2} receptors and is said to have virtually no affinity for the 5-HT_{1}, GABA, mAChRs, α_{1}-, and β-adrenoreceptors. It is a potent agonist of the 5-HT_{2B} receptor, but shows biased agonism at this receptor and does not appear to pose a risk of cardiac valvulopathy. The comprehensive receptor interactions of ropinirole have been described.

Ropinirole produces marked hypolocomotion at lower doses (1–50 mg/kg i.p.) and causes hyperlocomotion at higher doses (100 mg/kg i.p.) in rodents. The former effect is thought to be mediated by activation of inhibitory presynaptic dopamine autoreceptors and reduced dopamine release, while the latter action is thought to be due to stimulation of postsynaptic dopamine receptors. Activation of postsynaptic dopamine D_{2} receptors is thought to be involved in the antiparkinsonian effects of dopamine D_{2} receptor agonists like ropinrole.

=== Pharmacokinetics ===
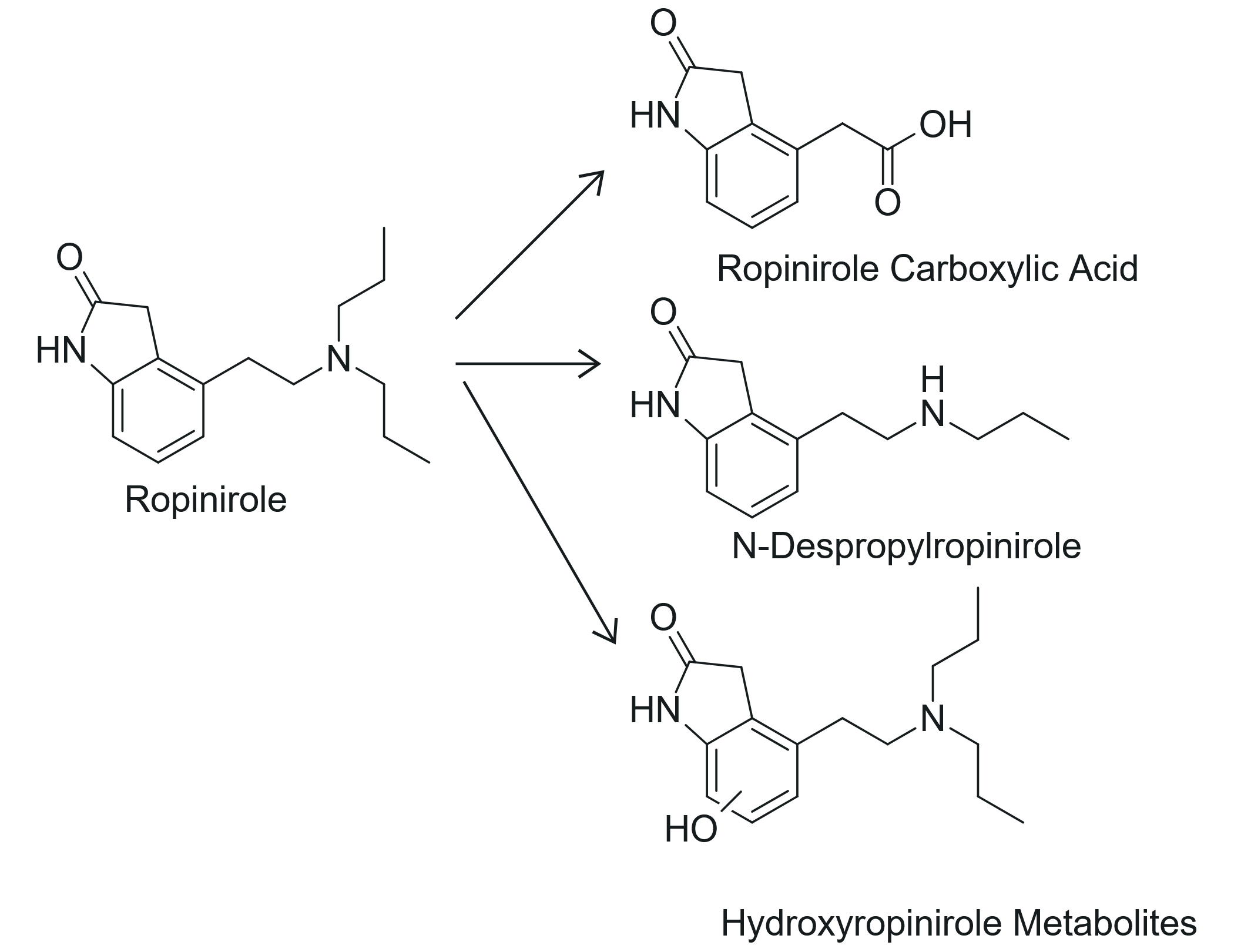
Major metabolites in vivo formed by CYP1A2-mediated metabolism of ropinirole.

Ropinirole is metabolized primarily by cytochrome P450 CYP1A2 to form two metabolites; SK&F-104557 (N-Despropyl Ropinirole) and SK&F-89124, both of which are renally excreted, and at doses higher than clinical, is also metabolized by CYP3A4. At doses greater than 24 mg, CYP2D6 may be inhibited, although this has been tested only in vitro.

7-Hydroxyropinirole (SK&F-89124), a major metabolite of ropinirole in rats but minor metabolite in humans (<5% of dose), is a highly potent dopamine receptor agonist with antiparkinsonian activity similarly to ropinirole. It has been reported to be 30-fold more potent than ropinirole as a dopamine D_{2} receptor agonist in vitro. However, ropinirole and 7-hydroxyropinirole were equipotent in terms of antiparkinsonian activity in rodents in vivo. 7-Hydroxyropinirole is said to be the only metabolite of ropinirole known to possess significant dopaminergic activity in vivo, although other ropinirole metabolites have also been found to have dopaminergic activity.

== Chemistry ==
Ropinirole is a partial ergoline. The chemical structure of the LSD metabolite 2-oxo-LSD is slightly related, and a notable analogue is DPAI (2-desoxo-2-ene-ropinirole).

Chemical structures of ropinirole and analogues
Ropinirole

DPAI

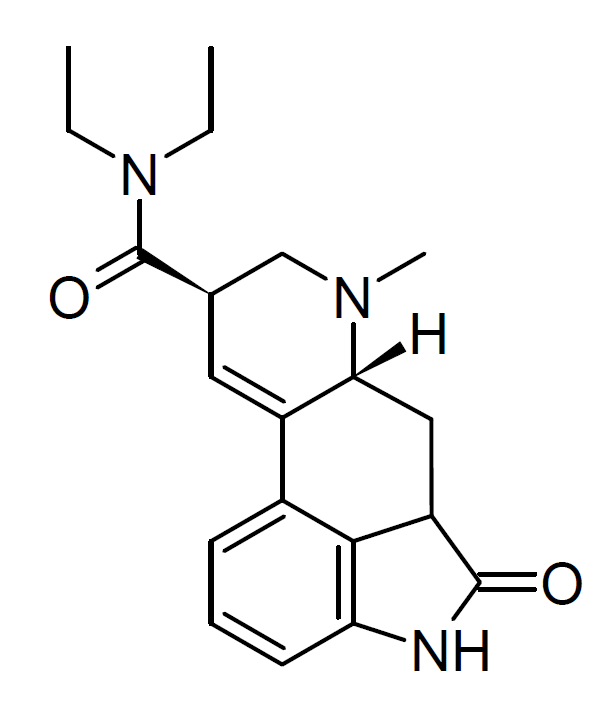
2-Oxo-LSD

== History ==
Ropinirole was first described in the scientific literature by 1985.

== Society and culture ==
It is manufactured by GlaxoSmithKline (GSK), Mylan Pharmaceuticals, Cipla, Dr. Reddy's Laboratories and Sun Pharmaceutical. The discovery of the drug's utility in restless legs syndrome has been used as an example of successful drug repurposing.

=== Lawsuit ===
In November 2012, GlaxoSmithKline was ordered by a Rennes appeals court to pay Frenchman Didier Jambart 197,000 euros ($255,824); Jambart had taken ropinirole from 2003 to 2010 and exhibited risky hypersexual behavior and gambled excessively until stopping the medication. This behavior displayed is characteristic of Dopamine Dysregulation Syndrome.

== See also ==
- Partial ergoline
