= Talipexole =

Chemical compound

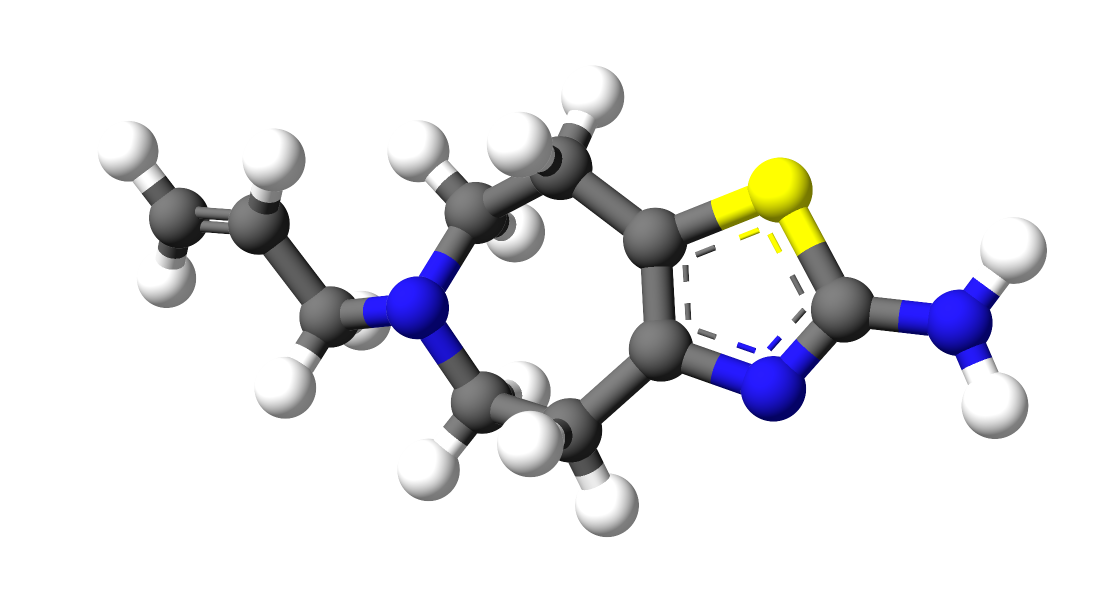

Clinical data
- Trade names: Domin
- Other names: Alefexole, B-HT920
- AHFS/Drugs.com: International Drug Names
- Routes of administration: Oral
- ATC code: none

Legal status
- Legal status: In general: ℞ (Prescription only)

Identifiers
- IUPAC name: 6-allyl-5,6,7,8-tetrahydro-4H-[1,3]thiazolo[4,5-d]azepin-2-amine
- CAS Number: 101626-70-4; DIHYDROCHLORIDE: 36085-73-1 36085-73-1
- PubChem CID: 5374
- IUPHAR/BPS: 5442
- ChemSpider: 5181
- UNII: 7AM2J46Z1Y; DIHYDROCHLORIDE: 9R6E1D8H1O
- ChEMBL: ChEMBL1289023
- CompTox Dashboard (EPA): DTXSID8046321

Chemical and physical data
- Formula: C_{10}H_{15}N_{3}S
- Molar mass: 209.31 g·mol^{−1}
- 3D model (JSmol): Interactive image
- SMILES: C=CCN1CCC2=C(SC(N)=N2)CC1
- InChI: InChI=1S/C10H15N3S/c1-2-5-13-6-3-8-9(4-7-13)14-10(11)12-8/h2H,1,3-7H2,(H2,11,12); Key:DHSSDEDRBUKTQY-UHFFFAOYSA-N

Talipexole (B-HT920, Domnin) is a dopamine agonist that is marketed as a treatment for Parkinson's disease in Japan by Boehringer Ingelheim; it was introduced in 1996. As of December 2014 it was not approved for marketing in the US nor in Europe.

Talipexole is a dopamine D_{2} receptor agonist and interacts with both pre- and post-synaptic receptors. It also is an α_{2}-adrenergic agonist.

The main side effects are drowsiness, dizziness, hallucinations and minor gastrointestinal complaints. In Japan, the Ministry of Health, Labour and Welfare mandated in 2008 that Boehringer add a warning to the label concerning the risk of sudden onset of sleep.

== Synthesis ==
Synthesis: Patents: Sino:

The N-alkylation of azepan-4-one [105416-56-6] (1) with allyl bromide in the presence of potassium carbonate gives 1-allyl-azepan-4-one (2). This is halogenated with molecular bromine in acetic acid to give 1-allyl-5-bromohexahydro-4-azepinone (3). The last step involves cyclization with thiourea (4) in refluxing ethanol, completing the synthesis of talipexole (5).

== See also ==
- Pramipexole
