= Punding =

Compulsive performance of repetitive, mechanical tasks

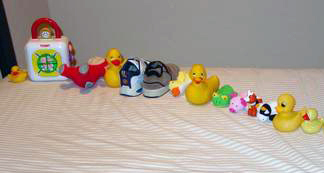
Punding, a possible symptom of dopamine dysregulation syndrome (DDS), is the repetition of complex motor behaviours such as collecting or arranging objects.

Punding is compulsive performance of repetitive, mechanical tasks, such as assembling and disassembling, collecting, or sorting objects. It can also apply to digital objects, such as computer files and data. The term was originally coined to describe complex, prolonged, purposeless (unproductive), and stereotyped behaviour in phenmetrazine and chronic amphetamine users, by Swedish forensic psychiatrist G. Rylander, in 1968. It was later described in Parkinson's disease, but mainly in cases of patients being treated with dopaminergic drugs. It has also been described in methamphetamine and cocaine users, as well as in some patients with gambling addictions, and hypersexuality.

For example, punding may consist of activities such as collecting pebbles and lining them up as perfectly as possible; disassembling and reassembling wristwatches; or conducting extended monologues devoid of context.

People engaging in punding find immersion in such activities comforting, even when it serves no purpose, and generally find it very frustrating to be diverted from them. They are not generally aware that there is a compulsive element, but will continue even when they have good reason to stop. Rylander describes a burglar who started punding and could not stop, even though he was suffering from an increasing apprehension of being caught. Interrupting can lead to various responses, including anger or rage, sometimes to the point of violence.

== Causes ==
Punding has been linked primarily to an imbalance in dopamine D_{1} receptor and D_{2} receptors activation within the cortico-basal-ganglia-thalamo-cortical loop, which has been proposed to lead to substantial changes in the striatum (especially its dorsal and ventral areas) and the nucleus accumbens, some of the main dopaminergic areas of the brain regulating psychomotoric functions and reward mechanisms. On the other hand, it has been noted that patients with Parkinson's disease treated with dopaminergic drugs that selectively activate only D_{3} receptors are the least likely to develop punding.

== Treatment ==
Treatment is mostly the same as for the dopamine dysregulation syndrome, but will vary depending on the cause: for patients with Parkinson's disease, doses of dopaminergic drugs such as levodopa must be reduced; while people addicted to dopaminergic stimulants like cocaine or amphetamines should be counseled on their issues of addiction and referred to an appropriate drug rehabilitation program.

Medications that have proven effective in the treatment of punding are atypical antipsychotics like quetiapine or clozapine. Amantadine has also been reported to be fairly effective, while memantine, an analog of amantadine with a more targeted pharmacological profile has not been evaluated but would presumably have similar efficacy to amantadine. Selective serotonin reuptake inhibitors have been found to be of virtually no use, although in a handful of cases they have led to the resolution of symptoms, especially sertraline but only in high doses (the fact that sertraline also activates dopamine D_{2} receptors is presumably involved).

While treating the root cause is considered to be the mainstay of treatment, cases where a reduction in the consumption of dopaminergic substances of any kind (medications or drugs) is unacceptable (such as when reducing the dose of levodopa in a patient with Parkinson's disease would lead to an unacceptable worsening of the symptoms) are the type of situations when medications are most frequently considered, usually as add-on therapies.

== See also ==
- Busywork, any activity undertaken to pass time
- Knolling, arranging flat objects on a desk at right angles
- Stimming, repetition of physical movements or sounds, particularly by autistic people
- Stereotypy, any repetitive or ritualistic movement, posture, or utterance
