= NAS-181 =

Serotonin 5-HT1B receptor antagonist

Clinical data
- Other names: NAS181; MCOMM
- Drug class: Serotonin 5-HT_{1B} receptor antagonist

Identifiers
- IUPAC name: (2R)-2-[[3-(morpholin-4-ylmethyl)-2H-chromen-8-yl]oxymethyl]morpholine
- CAS Number: 205242-61-1
- PubChem CID: 9955015
- UNII: EB3GE9ZR8T
- ChEMBL: ChEMBL1789131

Chemical and physical data
- Formula: C_{19}H_{26}N_{2}O_{4}
- Molar mass: 346.427 g·mol^{−1}
- 3D model (JSmol): Interactive image
- SMILES: C1CO[C@H](CN1)COC2=CC=CC3=C2OCC(=C3)CN4CCOCC4
- InChI: InChI=1S/C19H26N2O4/c1-2-16-10-15(12-21-5-8-22-9-6-21)13-25-19(16)18(3-1)24-14-17-11-20-4-7-23-17/h1-3,10,17,20H,4-9,11-14H2/t17-/m1/s1; Key:RTKDBEOSPDFLGD-QGZVFWFLSA-N

NAS-181, also known as MCOMM, is a selective rodent serotonin 5-HT_{1B} receptor antagonist which is used in scientific research.

In animals, NAS-181 has been found to strongly increase acetylcholine levels in the frontal cortex and hippocampus. It has been found to block memory impairment induced by the antimuscarinic agent scopolamine and by the NMDA receptor antagonist dizocilpine (MK-801). Injection of NAS-181 directly into the nucleus accumbens has also been found to reverse the prosocial behavior induced by the serotonin releasing agent MDMA in animals.

NAS-181 was first described in the scientific literature by 1998. The drug was discovered by researchers at Astra Arcus.

== See also ==
- AR-A000002
- Elzasonan
- GR-55562
- GR-127935
- SB-216641
- SB-236057
