= List of investigational aggression drugs =

This is a list of investigational aggression drugs, or drugs that are currently under development for clinical use in the treatment of aggression but are not yet approved. Drugs used to treat aggression may also be known as "serenics".

Chemical/generic names are listed first, with developmental code names, synonyms, and brand names in parentheses.

This list was last comprehensively updated in February 2025. It is likely to become outdated with time.

== Under development ==
=== Phase 3 ===
- Molindone (AFX 2201; EN-1733A; -810; SPN-810M; Zalvari) – antipsychotic (dopamine D_{2} receptor antagonist, serotonin 5-HT_{2B} receptor antagonist, and other actions) – specifically for aggression in children and adolescents with attention-deficit hyperactivity disorder (ADHD)

=== Phase 2 ===
- KNX-100 (SOC-1) – 15-lipoxygenase (15-LOX; ALOX15) inhibitor and oxytocin-like drug or indirect oxytocin receptor modulator
- Vafidemstat (ORY-2001) – lysine-specific demethylase 1 (LSD1; KDM1A) and monoamine oxidase B (MAO-B) inhibitor

=== Preclinical ===
- KNX-101 – 15-lipoxygenase (15-LOX; ALOX15) inhibitor
- SRX251 – vasopressin V_{1A} receptor antagonist – no recent development since 2007

== Not under development ==
=== No development reported ===
- Eltoprazine (DU-28853) – serotonin 5-HT_{1A} and 5-HT_{1B} receptor agonist and serotonin 5-HT_{2C} receptor antagonist
- Zolmitriptan (ML-004) – serotonin 5-HT_{1B} and 5-HT_{1D} receptor agonist

=== Development discontinued ===
- Batoprazine – serotonin 5-HT_{1A} and 5-HT_{1B} receptor agonist
- Mibampator (LY-451395) – ionotropic glutamate AMPA receptor positive allosteric modulator
- Olanzapine intranasal (INP-105; POD olanzapine) – atypical antipsychotic (non-selective monoamine receptor modulator)
- Risperidone extended-release (Risperisphere) – atypical antipsychotic (non-selective monoamine receptor modulator)

=== Formal development never or not yet started ===
- Antiandrogens (e.g., cyproterone acetate, medroxyprogesterone acetate, GnRH modulators)
- Other serotonin 5-HT_{1A} and 5-HT_{1B} receptor agonists (e.g., fluprazine)
- Selective 5-HT_{1B} receptor agonists (e.g., anpirtoline, CP-94253)
- Serotonin 5-HT_{1B} and 5-HT_{1D} receptor agonists (e.g., PGI-7043)
- Serotonin 5-HT_{2B} receptor antagonists (e.g., MW073)
- Serotonin 5-HT_{2C} receptor agonists (e.g., lorcaserin)
- Serotonin releasing agents (e.g., fenfluramine)
- Trace amine-associated receptor 1 (TAAR1) agonists (e.g., RO5263397)

== Clinically used drugs ==
=== Approved drugs ===
- Olanzapine (Zyprexa) – atypical antipsychotic (non-selective monoamine receptor modulator)
- Paliperidone (Invega) – atypical antipsychotic (non-selective monoamine receptor modulator)
- Risperidone (Risperdal) – atypical antipsychotic (non-selective monoamine receptor modulator)

=== Off-label drugs ===
- α_{2}-Adrenergic receptor agonists (e.g., clonidine, dexmedetomidine, guanfacine)
- Anticonvulsants (e.g., valproic acid, divalproex, carbamazepine, oxcarbazepine, phenytoin, lamotrigine, topiramate, gabapentin, tiagabine)
- Antidepressants (e.g., selective serotonin reuptake inhibitors (SSRIs) like sertraline) (but may exacerbate aggression)
- Benzodiazepines (e.g., diazepam, lorazepam, midazolam) (but may exacerbate aggression)
- Beta blockers (β-adrenergic receptor antagonists) (e.g., propranolol, pindolol, nadolol)
- Cannabinoids (e.g., cannabis, dronabinol, nabilone)
- Lithium – mood stabilizer with unknown mechanism of action
- Norepinephrine reuptake inhibitors (NRIs) (e.g., atomoxetine)
- Other antipsychotics (e.g., aripiprazole, chlorpromazine, droperidol, haloperidol, quetiapine, thioridazine)
- Psychostimulants (e.g., amphetamine, methylphenidate) (but may exacerbate aggression)

== See also ==
- List of investigational drugs
- List of investigational agitation drugs
- List of investigational antipsychotics
- List of investigational borderline personality disorder drugs
- List of investigational autism and pervasive developmental disorder drugs
- Serenic (antiaggressive drug)
- Anger § Medication therapy
- Entactogen
