= PGI-7043 =

Clinical data
- Other names: PGI7043
- Drug class: Serotonin 5-HT_{1B} receptor agonist; Serotonin 5-HT_{1D} receptor agonist
- ATC code: None

PGI-7043 is a serotonin 5-HT_{1B} and 5-HT_{1D} receptor agonist. It is a potent and highly centrally penetrant full agonist of the serotonin 5-HT_{1B} and 5-HT_{1D} receptors (EC_{50} = 1.3 nM and 0.5 nM, respectively).

The drug produces antidepressant-like, antiaggressive, and prosocial effects in rodents without producing sedation. In contrast, zolmitriptan was only weakly effective at a 100-fold higher dose in terms of antidepressant-like effects. This may be related to triptans like zolmitriptan having limited blood–brain barrier permeability and hence being peripherally selective. Moreover, while olanzapine also produced antiaggressive effects, it caused sedation and reduced social interaction as well. PGI-7043 suppressed rapid eye movement (REM) sleep as measured with electroencephalography (EEG) in rodents, which could serve as a novel translational biomarker for clinical studies. Serotonin 5-HT_{1B} and 5-HT_{1D} receptor occupancy were confirmed in rodents at doses producing behavioral and EEG effects. The drug is described as having excellent drug-like properties.

PGI-7043 was first described in the scientific literature in December 2024. It was discovered by PsychoGenics using their SmartCube drug discovery platform following screening of approximately 300 compounds. The drug might have therapeutic applications in the treatment of conditions like agitation in Alzheimer's disease, bipolar disorder, and schizophrenia as well as treatment of reduced social behavior in autism spectrum disorders. Its chemical structure does not yet appear to have been disclosed.

== See also ==
- Serotonin 5-HT_{1B} receptor agonist
- Serenic (antiaggressive drug)
- List of investigational aggression drugs
- List of investigational agitation drugs
- List of investigational autism and pervasive developmental disorder drugs
- Zolmitriptan § Social deficits and aggression
