= CP-93129 =

Chemical compound

Clinical data
- Other names: CP-93129; CP-93,129
- Drug class: Serotonin 5-HT_{1B} receptor agonist

Identifiers
- IUPAC name: 3-(1,2,3,6-tetrahydropyridin-4-yl)-1,4-dihydropyrrolo[3,2-b]pyridin-5-one
- CAS Number: 127792-75-0
- PubChem CID: 124007
- IUPHAR/BPS: 11
- ChemSpider: 110524
- UNII: Y4BW369LGS
- ChEBI: CHEBI:93436
- ChEMBL: ChEMBL304008
- CompTox Dashboard (EPA): DTXSID50155670

Chemical and physical data
- Formula: C_{12}H_{13}N_{3}O
- Molar mass: 215.256 g·mol^{−1}
- 3D model (JSmol): Interactive image
- SMILES: C1CNCC=C1C2=CNC3=C2NC(=O)C=C3
- InChI: InChI=1S/C12H13N3O/c16-11-2-1-10-12(15-11)9(7-14-10)8-3-5-13-6-4-8/h1-3,7,13-14H,4-6H2,(H,15,16); Key:PJYVGMRFPFNZCT-UHFFFAOYSA-N

CP-93129 is a drug which acts as a potent and selective serotonin 5-HT_{1B} receptor agonist, with approximately 150-fold and 200-fold selectivity over the closely related serotonin 5-HT_{1D} and 5-HT_{1A} receptors. It is used in the study of 5-HT_{1B} receptors in the brain, particularly their role in modulating the release of other neurotransmitters. It produces antiaggressive effects in rodents.

== See also ==
- Serotonin 5-HT_{1B} receptor agonist
- Cyclized tryptamine
