= C25H35N5O2 =

The molecular formula C_{25}H_{35}N_{5}O_{2} (molar mass: 437.588 g/mol) may refer to:

- F-12682
- F-14258
