= MW073 =

Clinical data
- Other names: MW-073
- Drug class: Serotonin 5-HT_{2B} receptor antagonist
- ATC code: None

Identifiers
- IUPAC name: 4-methyl-N-[2-(4-methylpiperazin-1-yl)ethyl]-6-naphthalen-2-ylpyridazin-3-amine
- PubChem CID: 171839064
- ChemSpider: 133320520

Chemical and physical data
- Formula: C_{22}H_{27}N_{5}
- Molar mass: 361.493 g·mol^{−1}
- 3D model (JSmol): Interactive image
- SMILES: CC1=CC(=NN=C1NCCN2CCN(CC2)C)C3=CC4=CC=CC=C4C=C3
- InChI: InChI=1S/C22H27N5/c1-17-15-21(20-8-7-18-5-3-4-6-19(18)16-20)24-25-22(17)23-9-10-27-13-11-26(2)12-14-27/h3-8,15-16H,9-14H2,1-2H3,(H,23,25); Key:IBOOAZHRKKSRLF-UHFFFAOYSA-N

MW073 is a serotonin 5-HT_{2B} receptor antagonist which is used in scientific research. It is a highly selective antagonist of the serotonin 5-HT_{2B} receptor. The drug is orally active in animals and is said to have a favorable drug-like profile. It produces antiaggressive effects without causing sedation or altering locomotor activity or anxiety in an animal model of Alzheimer's disease. Similarly, it produces neuroprotective, neurorestorative, and pro-cognitive-like effects in such models. MW073 was first described in the scientific literature by 2024. There is interest in MW073 for the potential treatment of Alzheimer's disease and other conditions.

== See also ==
- List of investigational aggression drugs
- Minaprine
