= SB-272183 =

Clinical data
- Other names: SB272183
- Drug class: Serotonin 5-HT_{1A} receptor antagonist; Serotonin 5-HT_{1B} receptor antagonist; Serotonin 5-HT_{1D} receptor antagonist

Identifiers
- IUPAC name: 5-chloro-6-(4-methylpiperazin-1-yl)-N-(4-pyridin-4-ylnaphthalen-1-yl)-2,3-dihydroindole-1-carboxamide
- CAS Number: 216058-27-4
- PubChem CID: 9870500
- IUPHAR/BPS: 75
- ChemSpider: 8046191
- ChEMBL: ChEMBL191971

Chemical and physical data
- Formula: C_{29}H_{28}ClN_{5}O
- Molar mass: 498.03 g·mol^{−1}
- 3D model (JSmol): Interactive image
- SMILES: CN1CCN(CC1)C2=C(C=C3CCN(C3=C2)C(=O)NC4=CC=C(C5=CC=CC=C54)C6=CC=NC=C6)Cl
- InChI: InChI=1S/C29H28ClN5O/c1-33-14-16-34(17-15-33)28-19-27-21(18-25(28)30)10-13-35(27)29(36)32-26-7-6-22(20-8-11-31-12-9-20)23-4-2-3-5-24(23)26/h2-9,11-12,18-19H,10,13-17H2,1H3,(H,32,36); Key:DAPBIPAGJXKFCI-UHFFFAOYSA-N

SB-272183 is a selective serotonin 5-HT_{1A}, 5-HT_{1B}, and 5-HT_{1D} receptor antagonist. It shows high affinity for these receptors, with K_{i} values of 10 nM, 7.9 nM, and 2.0 nM, respectively, and with at least 30-fold selectivity over various other receptors. The drug was a partial agonist of the serotonin 5-HT_{1A}, 5-HT_{1B}, and 5-HT_{1D} receptors in vitro, but showed only antagonistic activity ex vivo in native tissue. SB-272183 was first described in the scientific literature in 2001. It is said to have been the first selective serotonin 5-HT_{1A}, 5-HT_{1B}, and 5-HT_{1D} receptor antagonist to be described.
