= LY-393558 =

Chemical compound

Identifiers
- IUPAC name: 1-(2-(4-(6-fluoro-1H-indol-3-yl)-3,6-dihydropyridin-1(2H)-yl)ethyl)-3-isopropyl-6-(methylsulfonyl)-3,4-dihydro-1H-benzo[c][1,2,6]thiadiazine 2,2-dioxide
- CAS Number: 271780-64-4
- PubChem CID: 10347428
- ChemSpider: 8522886
- ChEMBL: ChEMBL4303390
- CompTox Dashboard (EPA): DTXSID60438426

Chemical and physical data
- Formula: C_{26}H_{31}FN_{4}O_{4}S_{2}
- Molar mass: 546.68 g·mol^{−1}
- 3D model (JSmol): Interactive image
- SMILES: FC1=CC=C2C(NC=C2C3=CCN(CCN4S(N(C(C)C)CC5=C4C=CC(S(=O)(C)=O)=C5)(=O)=O)CC3)=C1
- InChI: InChI=1S/C26H31FN4O4S2/c1-18(2)31-17-20-14-22(36(3,32)33)5-7-26(20)30(37(31,34)35)13-12-29-10-8-19(9-11-29)24-16-28-25-15-21(27)4-6-23(24)25/h4-8,14-16,18,28H,9-13,17H2,1-3H3; Key:QUSLYAPLTMMCFE-UHFFFAOYSA-N

LY-393558 is a potent serotonin reuptake inhibitor and antagonist of the 5-HT_{1B}, 5-HT_{1D}, and 5-HT_{2A} receptors. LY-393558 was also found to reduce serotonin-induced vasoconstriction, indicating that it may have therapeutic potential for the treatment of pulmonary hypertension.
