= ONO-2020 =

Clinical data
- Other names: ONO2020
- Routes of administration: Oral
- Drug class: Epigenetic modulator; Immunomodulator; Cognitive enhancer

ONO-2020 is an epigenetic modulator, immunomodulator, and possible cognitive enhancer which is under development for the treatment of agitation including due to Alzheimer's disease. It is taken orally. The drug's exact mechanism of action or biological target does not yet appear to have been disclosed. ONO-2020 is under development by Ono Pharmaceutical. As of May 2025, it is in phase 2 clinical trials for treatment of agitation and Alzheimer's disease. The chemical structure of ONO-2020 does not yet appear to have been disclosed.

== See also ==
- List of investigational agitation drugs
