= KNX-101 =

Clinical data
- Other names: KNX101
- Drug class: ALOX15 inhibitor

KNX-101 is a 15-lipoxygenase (15-LOX; ALOX15) inhibitor which is under development for the treatment of chronic agitation and aggression as well as acute and chronic pain. Whereas its predecessor KNX-100 (SOC-1) is described as a "short-acting" 15-LOX inhibitor, KNX-101 is said to be a "long-acting" 15-LOX inhibitor. Both KNX-100 and KNX-101 produce antiaggressive effects without causing sedation in the chronic social isolation model in rodents, whereas the atypical antipsychotic risperidone only reduces aggression at doses that also induce sedation. KNX-101 is under development by Kinoxis Therapeutics. As of January 2026, it is in the preclinical research stage of development.

== See also ==
- List of investigational agitation drugs
- List of investigational aggression drugs
- List of investigational analgesics
- KNX-100 (SOC-1)
