= GR-55562 =

5-HT1B and 5-HT1D antagonist

Clinical data
- Other names: GR55562; GR-55,562; GR55,562
- Drug class: Serotonin 5-HT_{1B} and 5-HT_{1D} receptor antagonist; Selective serotonin 5-HT_{1B} antagonist

Identifiers
- IUPAC name: 3-[3-(dimethylamino)propyl]-4-hydroxy-N-(4-pyridin-4-ylphenyl)benzamide
- CAS Number: 159533-26-3
- PubChem CID: 128018
- IUPHAR/BPS: 113
- ChemSpider: 113523
- UNII: QPY74DMU5M
- ChEBI: CHEBI:92813
- ChEMBL: ChEMBL119264
- CompTox Dashboard (EPA): DTXSID701150576

Chemical and physical data
- Formula: C_{23}H_{25}N_{3}O_{2}
- Molar mass: 375.472 g·mol^{−1}
- 3D model (JSmol): Interactive image
- SMILES: CN(C)CCCC1=C(C=CC(=C1)C(=O)NC2=CC=C(C=C2)C3=CC=NC=C3)O
- InChI: InChI=1S/C23H25N3O2/c1-26(2)15-3-4-19-16-20(7-10-22(19)27)23(28)25-21-8-5-17(6-9-21)18-11-13-24-14-12-18/h5-14,16,27H,3-4,15H2,1-2H3,(H,25,28); Key:ZAGAUUVCYGSPBP-UHFFFAOYSA-N

GR-55562 is a selective serotonin 5-HT_{1B} and 5-HT_{1D} receptor antagonist. It is one of several selective serotonin 5-HT_{1B} receptor antagonists used in scientific research.

The drug is a silent antagonist of the serotonin 5-HT_{1B} receptor, unlike the related agent GR-127935. GR-55562 has around 10-fold selectivity for the serotonin 5-HT_{1B} receptor over the serotonin 5-HT_{1D} receptor and has only weak affinity for a number of other serotonin receptors.

It is ineffective in attenuating MDMA-induced prosocial behavior in animals. Conversely, the serotonin 5-HT_{1A} receptor antagonist WAY-100635 can abolish MDMA-induced prosocial behavior.

== See also ==
- AR-A000002
- GR-127935
- SB-216641
- SB-236057
