= Irafamdastat =

Clinical data
- Other names: BMS-986368; CC-97489
- Routes of administration: Oral
- Drug class: Fatty acid amide hydrolase (FAAH) inhibitor; Monoacylglycerol lipase (MAGL) inhibitor; Indirect cannabinoid

Identifiers
- IUPAC name: (5-carbamoyl-3-pyridinyl) (2R)-2-methyl-4-[[3-(trifluoromethoxy)phenyl]methyl]piperazine-1-carboxylate
- CAS Number: 2244136-58-9
- PubChem CID: 139318505
- ChemSpider: 129623866
- UNII: X3Q33L6UL2
- KEGG: D13114
- ChEMBL: ChEMBL5917190

Chemical and physical data
- Formula: C_{20}H_{21}F_{3}N_{4}O_{4}
- Molar mass: 438.407 g·mol^{−1}
- 3D model (JSmol): Interactive image
- SMILES: C[C@@H]1CN(CCN1C(=O)OC2=CN=CC(=C2)C(=O)N)CC3=CC(=CC=C3)OC(F)(F)F
- InChI: InChI=1S/C20H21F3N4O4/c1-13-11-26(12-14-3-2-4-16(7-14)31-20(21,22)23)5-6-27(13)19(29)30-17-8-15(18(24)28)9-25-10-17/h2-4,7-10,13H,5-6,11-12H2,1H3,(H2,24,28)/t13-/m1/s1; Key:XXDVCULQMDDOAX-CYBMUJFWSA-N

Irafamdastat (INN, USAN; developmental code names BMS-986368 and CC-97489) is a centrally penetrant dual fatty acid amide hydrolase (FAAH) inhibitor and monoacylglycerol lipase (MAGL) inhibitor which is under development for the treatment of agitation, muscle spasticity, and neurological disorders. It is taken orally.

The drug is an irreversible inhibitor of both FAAH and MAGL, with IC_{50} values of 32 nM and 480 nM, respectively. By inhibiting these enzymes, irafamdastat is thought to increase levels of the endocannabinoids anandamide (AEA) and 2-arachidonoylglycerol (2-AG), and thereby to indirectly activate the cannabinoid CB_{1} and CB_{2} receptors. It produces anticonvulsant effects in animals. The drug is described as a potential first-in-class medication.

Irafamdastat is under development by Bristol Myers Squibb (via acquisition of Celgene Corporation). As of May 2026, it is in phase 2 clinical trials for agitation and muscle spasticity and is in phase 1 trials for neurological disorders.

== See also ==
- List of investigational agitation drugs
