= L-741604 =

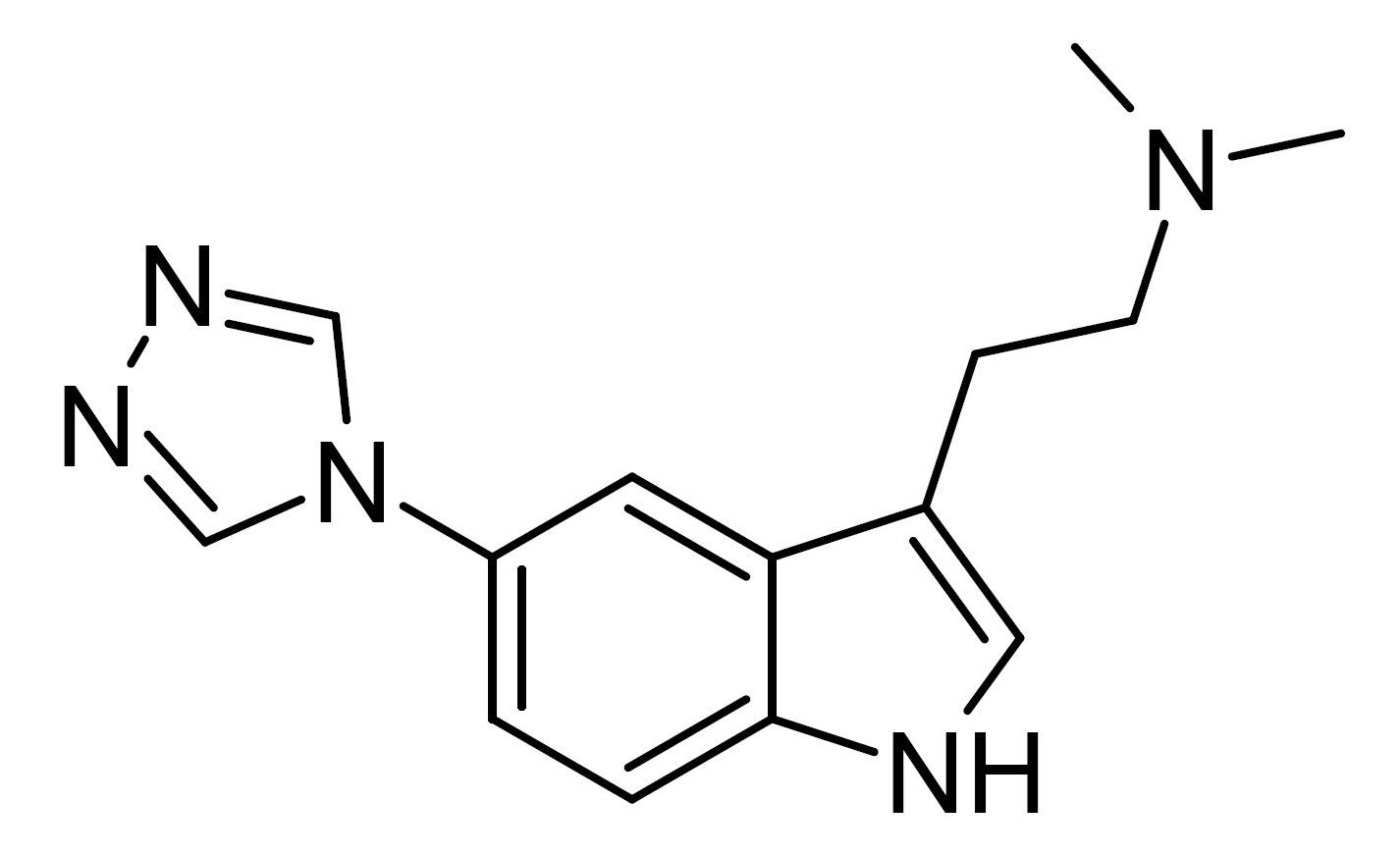

Identifiers
- IUPAC name: N,N-dimethyl-2-[5-(1,2,4-triazol-4-yl)-1H-indol-3-yl]ethanamine
- CAS Number: 154594-22-6
- PubChem CID: 9881526
- ChemSpider: 8057202
- UNII: 9IL3UOX666
- ChEMBL: ChEMBL296161

Chemical and physical data
- Formula: C_{14}H_{17}N_{5}
- Molar mass: 255.325 g·mol^{−1}
- 3D model (JSmol): Interactive image
- SMILES: CN(C)CCC1=CNC2=C1C=C(C=C2)N3C=NN=C3
- InChI: InChI=1S/C14H17N5/c1-18(2)6-5-11-8-15-14-4-3-12(7-13(11)14)19-9-16-17-10-19/h3-4,7-10,15H,5-6H2,1-2H3; Key:IGNXHSPBUUSUHB-UHFFFAOYSA-N

L-741,604 is an experimental drug from the substituted tryptamine family, which acts as an agonist for the 5-HT_{1B} and 5-HT_{1D} serotonin receptors, with around 6x selectivity for 5-HT_{1D}.
