= SB-216641 =

Chemical compound

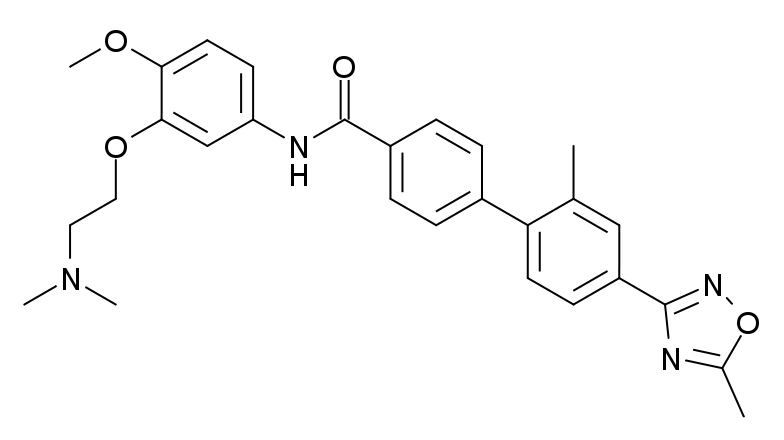

Clinical data
- ATC code: none

Identifiers
- IUPAC name: N-[3-[3-(dimethylamino)ethoxy]-4-methoxyphenyl]-2'-methyl-4'-(5-methyl-1,2,4-oxadiazol-3-yl)-[1,1'-biphenyl]-4-carboxamide
- CAS Number: 170230-39-4
- PubChem CID: 3292447
- IUPHAR/BPS: 28
- ChemSpider: 2541153
- UNII: ZM4360761C
- CompTox Dashboard (EPA): DTXSID4043985

Chemical and physical data
- Formula: C_{28}H_{30}N_{4}O_{4}
- Molar mass: 486.572 g·mol^{−1}
- 3D model (JSmol): Interactive image
- SMILES: CN(C)CCOc1cc(ccc1OC)NC(=O)c3ccc(cc3)-c2ccc(cc2C)-c4noc(C)n4
- InChI: InChI=1S/C28H30N4O4/c1-18-16-22(27-29-19(2)36-31-27)10-12-24(18)20-6-8-21(9-7-20)28(33)30-23-11-13-25(34-5)26(17-23)35-15-14-32(3)4/h6-13,16-17H,14-15H2,1-5H3,(H,30,33); Key:JRNUKVFYILMMLX-UHFFFAOYSA-N

SB-216641 is a drug which is a selective antagonist for the serotonin receptor 5-HT_{1B}, with around 25x selectivity over the closely related 5-HT_{1D} receptor. It is used in scientific research, and has demonstrated anxiolytic effects in animal studies.

== See also ==
- AR-A000002
- GR-55562
- GR-127935
- SB-236057
