= SB-616234 =

Clinical data
- Other names: SB616234; SB-616,234; SB-616234-A; SB-616234A
- Drug class: Serotonin 5-HT_{1B} receptor antagonist
- ATC code: None

Identifiers
- IUPAC name: [6-[(3R,5S)-3,5-dimethylpiperazin-1-yl]-5-methoxy-2,3-dihydroindol-1-yl]-[4-[2-methyl-4-(5-methyl-1,2,4-oxadiazol-3-yl)phenyl]phenyl]methanone
- CAS Number: 332397-72-5
- PubChem CID: 11591924
- ChemSpider: 9766686
- ChEMBL: ChEMBL196666

Chemical and physical data
- Formula: C_{32}H_{35}N_{5}O_{3}
- Molar mass: 537.664 g·mol^{−1}
- 3D model (JSmol): Interactive image
- SMILES: C[C@@H]1CN(C[C@@H](N1)C)C2=C(C=C3CCN(C3=C2)C(=O)C4=CC=C(C=C4)C5=C(C=C(C=C5)C6=NOC(=N6)C)C)OC
- InChI: InChI=1S/C32H35N5O3/c1-19-14-26(31-34-22(4)40-35-31)10-11-27(19)23-6-8-24(9-7-23)32(38)37-13-12-25-15-30(39-5)29(16-28(25)37)36-17-20(2)33-21(3)18-36/h6-11,14-16,20-21,33H,12-13,17-18H2,1-5H3/t20-,21+; Key:QNLSCNDZNSALTM-OYRHEFFESA-N

SB-616234 is a selective serotonin 5-HT_{1B} receptor antagonist. In terms of affinity, it shows 50-fold selectivity for the serotonin 5-HT_{1B} receptor over the serotonin 5-HT_{1D} receptor and greater than 100-fold selectivity for the serotonin 5-HT_{1B} receptor over other serotonin receptors. The drug is a silent antagonist of the serotonin 5-HT_{1B} receptor. It dose-dependently increases serotonin levels in the dentate gyrus of the hippocampus in rodents via blockade of serotonin 5-HT_{1B} autoreceptors. In addition, it augments the increased serotonin levels induced by the selective serotonin reuptake inhibitor (SSRI) paroxetine in this brain area in rodents. The drug produces antidepressant- and anxiolytic-like effects in rodents and anxiolytic-like effects in monkeys. It is orally active. SB-616234 was first described in the scientific literature by 2003.
