= NMRA-511 =

Clinical data
- Other names: NMRA511; BTRX-323511; BTRX323511; NMRA-323511; NMRA323511
- Drug class: Vasopressin V_{1A} receptor antagonist

NMRA-511, also known as BTRX-323511 or NMRA-323511, is a vasopressin V_{1A} receptor antagonist which is under development for the treatment of agitation and anxiety disorders. It has been found to reduce threat behaviors in marmosets. The drug was originated by BlackThorn Therapeutics and is under development by Neumora Therapeutics. As of April 2026, it is in phase 1 clinical trials for agitation, whereas no decent development has been reported for anxiety disorders. The chemical structure of NMRA-511 does not yet appear to have been disclosed.

== See also ==
- List of investigational agitation drugs
- List of investigational anxiety disorder drugs
