= AR-A000002 =

Chemical compound

Clinical data
- Other names: AZD-8129; AZD8129
- ATC code: none

Identifiers
- IUPAC name: (R)-N-[5-methyl-8-(4-methylpiperazin-1-yl)-1,2,3,4-tetrahydro-2-naphthyl]-4-morpholinobenzamide
- CAS Number: 220051-79-6
- PubChem CID: 9846516
- ChemSpider: 8022230
- UNII: L3CZ2XB4ER
- CompTox Dashboard (EPA): DTXSID801027304

Chemical and physical data
- Formula: C_{27}H_{36}N_{4}O_{2}
- Molar mass: 448.611 g·mol^{−1}
- 3D model (JSmol): Interactive image
- SMILES: C5COCCN5c(cc4)ccc4C(=O)NC2CCc1c(C2)c(ccc1C)N3CCN(C)CC3
- InChI: InChI=1S/C27H36N4O2/c1-20-3-10-26(31-13-11-29(2)12-14-31)25-19-22(6-9-24(20)25)28-27(32)21-4-7-23(8-5-21)30-15-17-33-18-16-30/h3-5,7-8,10,22H,6,9,11-19H2,1-2H3,(H,28,32)/t22-/m1/s1; Key:IHDRUIHIJWCTIY-JOCHJYFZSA-N

AR-A000002, also known as AZD-8129, is a drug which is one of the first compounds developed to act as a selective antagonist for the serotonin receptor 5-HT_{1B}, with approximately 10x selectivity for 5-HT_{1B} over the closely related 5-HT_{1D} receptor. It has been shown to produce sustained increases in levels of serotonin in the brain, and has anxiolytic effects in animal studies.

== See also ==
- GR-55562
- GR-127935
- SB-216641
- SB-236057
