= (S)-DCPT =

Clinical data
- Drug class: Serotonin 5-HT_{1B} receptor agonist
- ATC code: None

Identifiers
- IUPAC name: (2S)-5-(2-chlorophenyl)-N,N-dipropyl-1,2,3,4-tetrahydronaphthalen-2-amine
- PubChem CID: 156011291
- ChemSpider: 129494222
- ChEMBL: ChEMBL4637900

Chemical and physical data
- Formula: C_{22}H_{28}ClN
- Molar mass: 341.92 g·mol^{−1}
- 3D model (JSmol): Interactive image
- SMILES: CCCN(CCC)[C@H]1CCC2=C(C1)C=CC=C2C3=CC=CC=C3Cl
- InChI: InChI=1S/C22H28ClN/c1-3-14-24(15-4-2)18-12-13-19-17(16-18)8-7-10-20(19)21-9-5-6-11-22(21)23/h5-11,18H,3-4,12-16H2,1-2H3/t18-/m0/s1; Key:QSQZCAQYYCNBSR-SFHVURJKSA-N

(S)-DCPT is an experimental drug of the 2-aminotetralin family, related to the selective serotonin 5-HT_{1A} receptor agonist 8-OH-DPAT. However, (S)-DPCT instead acts as a selective agonist for the serotonin 5-HT_{1B} receptor, with moderate selectivity over 5-HT_{1D} and good selectivity over 5-HT_{1A}, 5-HT_{7}, and other serotonin receptors.

== See also ==
- Substituted 2-aminotetralin
- UH-232
- UH-301
