= Eltoprazine =

Chemical compound

Clinical data
- Other names: DU-28,853; DU-28853; DU28853
- Routes of administration: Oral
- Drug class: Non-selective serotonin receptor modulator; Serotonin 5-HT_{1A} receptor agonist; Serotonin 5-HT_{1B} receptor agonist; Serotonin 5-HT_{2C} receptor
- ATC code: None

Pharmacokinetic data
- Bioavailability: 95%
- Onset of action: 1–4 hours (T_{max})
- Elimination half-life: 7–9 hours
- Excretion: Urine: 40% unchanged

Identifiers
- IUPAC name: 1-(2,3-dihydro-1,4-benzodioxin-5-yl)piperazine
- CAS Number: 98224-03-4
- PubChem CID: 65853
- ChemSpider: 59265
- UNII: 510M006KO6
- ChEBI: CHEBI:234413
- ChEMBL: ChEMBL282614
- CompTox Dashboard (EPA): DTXSID5048425

Chemical and physical data
- Formula: C_{12}H_{16}N_{2}O_{2}
- Molar mass: 220.272 g·mol^{−1}
- 3D model (JSmol): Interactive image
- SMILES: C1CN(CCN1)C2=C3C(=CC=C2)OCCO3
- InChI: InChI=1S/C12H16N2O2/c1-2-10(14-6-4-13-5-7-14)12-11(3-1)15-8-9-16-12/h1-3,13H,4-9H2; Key:WVLHGCRWEHCIOT-UHFFFAOYSA-N

Eltoprazine (INN; developmental code name DU-28,853) is a non-selective serotonin receptor modulator of the phenylpiperazine family which was under development for the treatment of aggression, attention deficit hyperactivity disorder (ADHD), cognition disorders, drug-induced dyskinesia, and psychotic disorders but was never marketed. It has been described as a "serenic" or antiaggressive agent. The drug is taken orally.

It acts as an agonist of the serotonin 5-HT_{1A} and 5-HT_{1B} receptors and as an antagonist of the serotonin 5-HT_{2C} receptor (K_{i} = 40 nM, 52 nM, and 81 nM, respectively). The drug also shows weaker affinity for certain other serotonin receptors and targets. The pharmacokinetics of eltoprazine have been studied. Eltoprazine is closely related to fluprazine and batoprazine, which are similarly acting agents, and is also a known chemical precursor to S-15535 and lecozotan.

Eltoprazine was first described in the scientific literature by 1987. It was originated by Solvay and was developed by Elto Pharma, PsychoGenics, and Solvay. The drug is or was under development for the treatment of aggression, ADHD, cognitive disorders, and drug-induced dyskinesia, but no recent development has been reported for these indications as of 2022. It was also under development for the treatment of psychotic disorders, but development for this indication was discontinued. Eltoprazine reached phase 2 or 3 clinical trials. According to David Nutt, eltoprazine showed shown signs of effectiveness in the treatment of aggression but was rejected for marketing authorization on the basis of aggression being a symptom rather than a disorder.

== See also ==
- Substituted phenylpiperazine
- List of investigational aggression drugs
