= S-15535 =

Chemical compound

Clinical data
- Other names: S15535
- Drug class: Serotonin 5-HT_{1A} receptor partial agonist
- ATC code: None

Identifiers
- IUPAC name: 1-(2,3-dihydro-1,4-benzodioxin-8-yl)-4-(2,3-dihydro-1H-inden-2-yl)piperazine
- CAS Number: 146998-34-7
- PubChem CID: 132787
- IUPHAR/BPS: 26
- ChemSpider: 117196
- UNII: XE6KA72FCB
- ChEMBL: ChEMBL49247
- CompTox Dashboard (EPA): DTXSID90163557
- ECHA InfoCard: 100.150.279

Chemical and physical data
- Formula: C_{21}H_{24}N_{2}O_{2}
- Molar mass: 336.435 g·mol^{−1}
- 3D model (JSmol): Interactive image
- SMILES: C1CN(CCN1C2CC3=CC=CC=C3C2)C4=C5C(=CC=C4)OCCO5
- InChI: InChI=1S/C21H24N2O2/c1-2-5-17-15-18(14-16(17)4-1)22-8-10-23(11-9-22)19-6-3-7-20-21(19)25-13-12-24-20/h1-7,18H,8-15H2; Key:QJPPEMXOOWNICQ-UHFFFAOYSA-N

S-15535 is a phenylpiperazine drug which is a potent and highly selective 5-HT_{1A} receptor ligand that acts as an agonist and antagonist (weak partial agonist) at the presynaptic and postsynaptic 5-HT_{1A} receptors, respectively. It has anxiolytic and antiaggressive effects.

== See also ==
- Phenylpiperazine
