= Losindole =

Tricyclic antidepressant

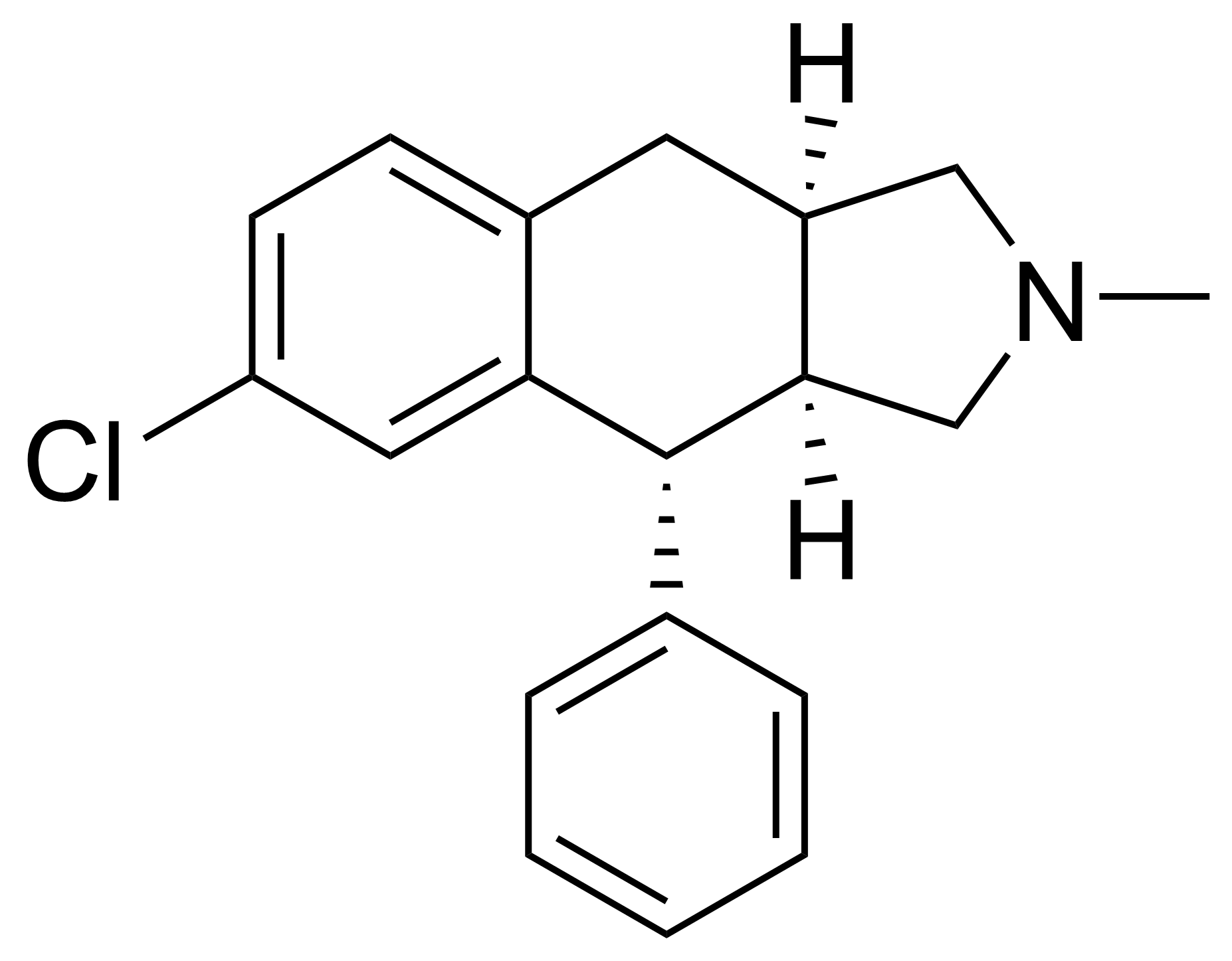

Clinical data
- Routes of administration: Oral
- ATC code: none

Legal status
- Legal status: In general: uncontrolled

Identifiers
- IUPAC name: (3aS,4R,9aR)-6-chloro-2-methyl-4-phenyl-2,3,3a,4,9,9a-hexahydro-1H-benzo[f]isoindole
- CAS Number: 69175-77-5
- PubChem CID: 3045392
- ChemSpider: 2308134
- UNII: IX8TM6153H
- CompTox Dashboard (EPA): DTXSID50219221

Chemical and physical data
- Formula: C_{19}H_{20}ClN
- Molar mass: 297.83 g·mol^{−1}
- 3D model (JSmol): Interactive image
- SMILES: Clc1ccc3c(c1)[C@@H](c2ccccc2)[C@H]4[C@@H](C3)CN(C4)C

Losindole (BI-27,062) is an antidepressant with a tricyclic structure. It was never marketed.

== See also ==
- Molindone
- Piquindone
