= Minaprine =

Chemical compound

Clinical data
- Trade names: Brantur, Cantor, Isopulsan, Nortimic
- Other names: AGR-620; AGR620; AGR-1240; AGR1240; CB-30038; CB30038
- AHFS/Drugs.com: International Drug Names
- Routes of administration: Oral
- Drug class: Monoamine oxidase inhibitor (MAOI); Reversible inhibitor of MAO-A (RIMA)
- ATC code: N06AX07 (WHO)

Legal status
- Legal status: BR: Class C1 (Other controlled substances); In general: ℞ (Prescription only)

Pharmacokinetic data
- Elimination half-life: 2-2.5 hours

Identifiers
- IUPAC name: 4-methyl-N-(2-morpholin-4-ylethyl)-6-phenylpyridazin-3-amine
- CAS Number: 25905-77-5
- PubChem CID: 4199
- ChemSpider: 4054
- UNII: 00U7GX0NLM
- KEGG: D05039
- ChEMBL: ChEMBL278819
- CompTox Dashboard (EPA): DTXSID5048477
- ECHA InfoCard: 100.043.012

Chemical and physical data
- Formula: C_{17}H_{22}N_{4}O
- Molar mass: 298.390 g·mol^{−1}
- 3D model (JSmol): Interactive image
- SMILES: CC1=CC(=NN=C1NCCN2CCOCC2)C3=CC=CC=C3
- InChI: InChI=1S/C17H22N4O/c1-14-13-16(15-5-3-2-4-6-15)19-20-17(14)18-7-8-21-9-11-22-12-10-21/h2-6,13H,7-12H2,1H3,(H,18,20); Key:LDMWSLGGVTVJPG-UHFFFAOYSA-N

Minaprine (INN, USAN, BAN), sold under the brand name Cantor among others, is a monoamine oxidase inhibitor antidepressant drug that was used in France for the treatment of depression until it was withdrawn from the market in 1996 because it caused convulsions.

== Pharmacology ==
=== Pharmacodynamics ===
Minaprine is a monoamine oxidase inhibitor (MAOI). A study found that it acts as a reversible inhibitor of MAO-A (RIMA) in rats, albeit with very low potency. In addition to its RIMA activity, minaprine has been found to act as a weak antagonist of the serotonin 5-HT_{2B} receptor (K_{i} = 863 nM).

It has also been found to weakly inhibit acetylcholinesterase in rat brain (striatum) homogenates.

It has demonstrated significant antibiotic activity against M. chelonae and M. abscessus in tests with antibiotic resistant bacteria.

== Chemistry ==
=== Synthesis ===
The first synthesis of minaprine was disclosed in patents published in 1979.

The final step is the reaction between a chloro-substituted pyridazine and the primary amine group of a morpholine derivative. The required pyridazine can be made by the reaction of acetophenone and pyruvic acid, followed by ring formation using hydrazine, giving a pyrazidinone. Treatment of this with phosphoryl chloride converts it to the required chloro derivative.

=== Analogues ===
Close analogues of minaprine acting as selective serotonin 5-HT_{2B} receptor antagonists such as MW071 and MW073 have been described.
