= SB-245570 =

Clinical data
- Other names: SB245570
- Routes of administration: Unknown
- Drug class: Serotonin 5-HT_{1B} receptor antagonist

Identifiers
- IUPAC name: 1-[3-methyl-4-[4-(1'-methylspiro[6,7-dihydro-2H-furo[2,3-f]indole-3,4'-piperidine]-5-carbonyl)phenyl]phenyl]pyrrolidin-2-one
- PubChem CID: 9914680
- ChemSpider: 8090329

Chemical and physical data
- Formula: C_{33}H_{35}N_{3}O_{3}
- Molar mass: 521.661 g·mol^{−1}
- 3D model (JSmol): Interactive image
- SMILES: CC1=C(C=CC(=C1)N2CCCC2=O)C3=CC=C(C=C3)C(=O)N4CCC5=CC6=C(C=C54)C7(CCN(CC7)C)CO6
- InChI: InChI=1S/C33H35N3O3/c1-22-18-26(35-14-3-4-31(35)37)9-10-27(22)23-5-7-24(8-6-23)32(38)36-15-11-25-19-30-28(20-29(25)36)33(21-39-30)12-16-34(2)17-13-33/h5-10,18-20H,3-4,11-17,21H2,1-2H3; Key:JGCKXFDIYYQZDT-UHFFFAOYSA-N

SB-245570 is a serotonin 5-HT_{1B} receptor antagonist which was under development for the treatment of major depressive disorder but was never marketed. It was being developed by GlaxoSmithKline in the 1990s. A chemical synthesis for SB-245570 has been published. The drug reached the preclinical research stage of development prior to the discontinuation of its development.

== See also ==
- List of investigational antidepressants
