= Elzasonan =

Chemical compound

Clinical data
- Routes of administration: Oral
- ATC code: none

Legal status
- Legal status: In general: uncontrolled

Identifiers
- IUPAC name: 4-(3,4-dichlorophenyl)-2-[2-(4-methylpiperazin-1-yl)-benzylidene]-thiomorpholin-3-one
- CAS Number: 361343-19-3; HCl: 220322-05-4
- PubChem CID: 6914152; HCl: 6506051
- ChemSpider: 5290108
- UNII: 933PJL964R; HCl: X38F62RR8L

Chemical and physical data
- Formula: C_{22}H_{23}Cl_{2}N_{3}OS
- Molar mass: 448.41 g·mol^{−1}
- 3D model (JSmol): Interactive image
- SMILES: Clc4c(Cl)cc(N1C(=O)C(\SCC1)=C\c3ccccc3N2CCN(C)CC2)cc4
- InChI: InChI=1S/C22H23Cl2N3OS/c1-25-8-10-26(11-9-25)20-5-3-2-4-16(20)14-21-22(28)27(12-13-29-21)17-6-7-18(23)19(24)15-17/h2-7,14-15H,8-13H2,1H3/b21-14-; Key:LHYMPSWMHXUWSK-STZFKDTASA-N

Elzasonan (CP-448,187) is a selective 5-HT_{1B} and 5-HT_{1D} receptor antagonist that was under development by Pfizer for the treatment of depression but was discontinued, possibly due to poor efficacy. By preferentially blocking 5-HT_{1B} and 5-HT_{1D} autoreceptors, elzasonan is thought to enhance serotonergic innervations originating from the raphe nucleus, thereby improving signaling to limbic regions like the hippocampus and prefrontal cortex and ultimately resulting in antidepressant effects.

== See also ==
- GR-127,935
- SB-649,915
