= Dextromethorphan/quinidine =

Pharmaceutical drug

Combination of
- Dextromethorphan: Sigma-1 receptor agonist, NMDA receptor antagonist, serotonin–norepinephrine reuptake inhibitor
- Quinidine: Antiarrhythmic agent, CYP2D6 inhibitor

Clinical data
- Trade names: Nuedexta
- Other names: AVP-923; DXM/quinidine
- AHFS/Drugs.com: Monograph
- MedlinePlus: a611048
- License data: US DailyMed: Nuedexta
- Routes of administration: By mouth
- ATC code: None

Legal status
- Legal status: US: ℞-only; In general: ℞ (Prescription only)

Pharmacokinetic data
- Bioavailability: dextromethorphan 11%, quinidine 70-80%. Food has no effect on absorption.
- Metabolism: Liver, extensive. Dextromethorphan is catalyzed by CYP2D6. Quinidine is metabolized by CYP3A4 and competitively inhibits the metabolism of dextromethorphan to increase and prolong plasma concentrations of dextromethorphan
- Elimination half-life: dextromethorphan 13h, quinidine 7h
- Excretion: quinidine 5-20%

Identifiers
- CAS Number: 2445595-41-3
- KEGG: D10208

Dextromethorphan/quinidine, sold under the brand name Nuedexta, is a fixed-dose combination medication for the treatment of pseudobulbar affect (PBA). It contains dextromethorphan (DXM) and the class I antiarrhythmic agent quinidine.

Dextromethorphan/quinidine was approved for medical use in the United States in October 2010, and is marketed by Avanir Pharmaceuticals.

== Medical uses ==
DXM/quinidine is used in the treatment of PBA. In a 12-week randomized, double-blind trial, amyotrophic lateral sclerosis and multiple sclerosis patients with significant PBA were given either Nuedexta 20/10 mg or placebo. In 326 randomized patients, the PBA-episode daily rate was 46.9% (p < 0.0001) lower for Nuedexta than for placebo. The three deaths in each of the two drug treatment arms and the single death in the placebo arm of the study were believed to be due to the natural course of the disease. DXM/quinidine has been reported to reduce bulbar symptoms such as dysarthria and dysphagia in patients with amyotrophic lateral sclerosis, with positive patient-reported outcomes in a multicenter study.

== Contraindications ==
- Atrioventricular (AV) block, complete, without implanted pacemaker or at high risk of complete AV block
- Concomitant use with drugs containing quinidine, quinine, or mefloquine
- Concomitant use with drugs that both prolong the QT interval and are metabolized by CYP2D6 (e.g., thioridazine, pimozide); effects on QT interval may be increased
- Concomitant use with MAOIs or use of MAOIs within 14 days; risk of serious, potentially fatal, drug interactions including serotonin syndrome
- Heart failure
- Hypersensitivity to dextromethorphan
- Hypersensitivity to quinine, mefloquine, quinidine, or dextromethorphan/quinidine with a history of thrombocytopenia, hepatitis, bone marrow depression or lupus-like syndrome induced by these drugs
- QT interval, prolonged or congenital long QT syndrome or a history suggesting torsades de pointes

== Adverse effects ==
Common risks and side effects include:

- Abdominal pain
- Asthenia
- Cough
- Diarrhea (reported in 13% of patients)
- Dizziness
- Elevated gamma glutamyltransferase
- Flu-like symptoms
- Flatulence
- Prolonged QT interval
- Muscle spasm
- Peripheral edema
- Urinary tract infection
- Vomiting

== Interactions ==
- Desipramine (CYP2D6 substrate) levels increase 8-fold with co-administration
- Paroxetine (CYP2D6 inhibitor and substrate)
- Memantine

== Pharmacology ==
=== Pharmacodynamics ===
Dextromethorphan acts as a σ_{1} receptor agonist, serotonin–norepinephrine reuptake inhibitor, and NMDA receptor antagonist, while quinidine is an antiarrhythmic agent acting as a CYP2D6 inhibitor. Quinidine prevents the metabolism of dextromethorphan into its active metabolite dextrorphan, which is a much more potent NMDA receptor antagonist but much less potent serotonin reuptake inhibitor than dextromethorphan. The mechanism of action of dextromethorphan/quinidine in the treatment of PBA is unknown.

== Research ==
Dextromethorphan/quinidine was investigated for the treatment of agitation associated with dementia, diabetic neuropathy, drug-induced dyskinesia, migraine, and neuropathic pain, but development for these indications was discontinued. Another formulation, deudextromethorphan/quinidine, is still under investigation for various indications. These include agitation, schizophrenia, and major depressive disorder, among others.

== See also ==
- Bupropion/dextromethorphan
- Deudextromethorphan/quinidine
