= Fluprazine =

Chemical compound

Clinical data
- Other names: DU-27,716; DU-27716; DU27716
- Routes of administration: Oral
- ATC code: none

Legal status
- Legal status: In general: uncontrolled

Identifiers
- IUPAC name: 2-[4-[3-(trifluoromethyl)phenyl]piperazin-1-yl]ethylurea
- CAS Number: 76716-60-4
- PubChem CID: 71153
- DrugBank: DB20166
- ChemSpider: 64297
- UNII: 713BBL6840
- ChEMBL: ChEMBL2106753
- CompTox Dashboard (EPA): DTXSID70227545

Chemical and physical data
- Formula: C_{14}H_{19}F_{3}N_{4}O
- Molar mass: 316.328 g·mol^{−1}
- 3D model (JSmol): Interactive image
- SMILES: C1CN(CCN1CCNC(=O)N)C2=CC=CC(=C2)C(F)(F)F

Fluprazine (developmental code name DU-27,716) is a drug of the phenylpiperazine family. It is a so-called serenic or antiaggressive agent. It is closely related to several other piperazines, including eltoprazine and batoprazine, and TFMPP, as well as more distantly to the azapirones such as buspirone. The pharmacology of fluprazine is unknown, but it is likely to act as an agonist at the 5-HT_{1A} and 5-HT_{1B} receptors like its sister compound eltoprazine.

== See also ==
- Substituted phenylpiperazine
- List of investigational aggression drugs
