= AZD-3783 =

Clinical data
- Other names: AZD3783; AZ-12320927; AZ12320927
- Routes of administration: Unspecified
- Drug class: Serotonin 5-HT_{1B} receptor antagonist

Identifiers
- IUPAC name: (2R)-6-methoxy-8-(4-methylpiperazin-1-yl)-N-(4-morpholin-4-ylphenyl)-3,4-dihydro-2H-chromene-2-carboxamide
- CAS Number: 1162658-64-1
- PubChem CID: 25067561
- ChemSpider: 24651803
- UNII: 3NC9ASE900
- ChEMBL: ChEMBL602875

Chemical and physical data
- Formula: C_{26}H_{34}N_{4}O_{4}
- Molar mass: 466.582 g·mol^{−1}
- 3D model (JSmol): Interactive image
- SMILES: CN1CCN(CC1)C2=CC(=CC3=C2O[C@H](CC3)C(=O)NC4=CC=C(C=C4)N5CCOCC5)OC
- InChI: InChI=1S/C26H34N4O4/c1-28-9-11-30(12-10-28)23-18-22(32-2)17-19-3-8-24(34-25(19)23)26(31)27-20-4-6-21(7-5-20)29-13-15-33-16-14-29/h4-7,17-18,24H,3,8-16H2,1-2H3,(H,27,31)/t24-/m1/s1; Key:SKOWCFJEXPLGNE-XMMPIXPASA-N

AZD-3783, also known as AZ12320927, is a serotonin 5-HT_{1B} receptor antagonist which was under development for the treatment of major depressive disorder and anxiety disorders. It was being developed by AstraZeneca. The drug reached phase 1 clinical trials prior to the discontinuation of its development. It was discontinued following unexpected neurotoxicity findings in animals.

== See also ==
- AZD-1134
- List of investigational antidepressants
- List of investigational anxiolytics
