= AZD-1134 =

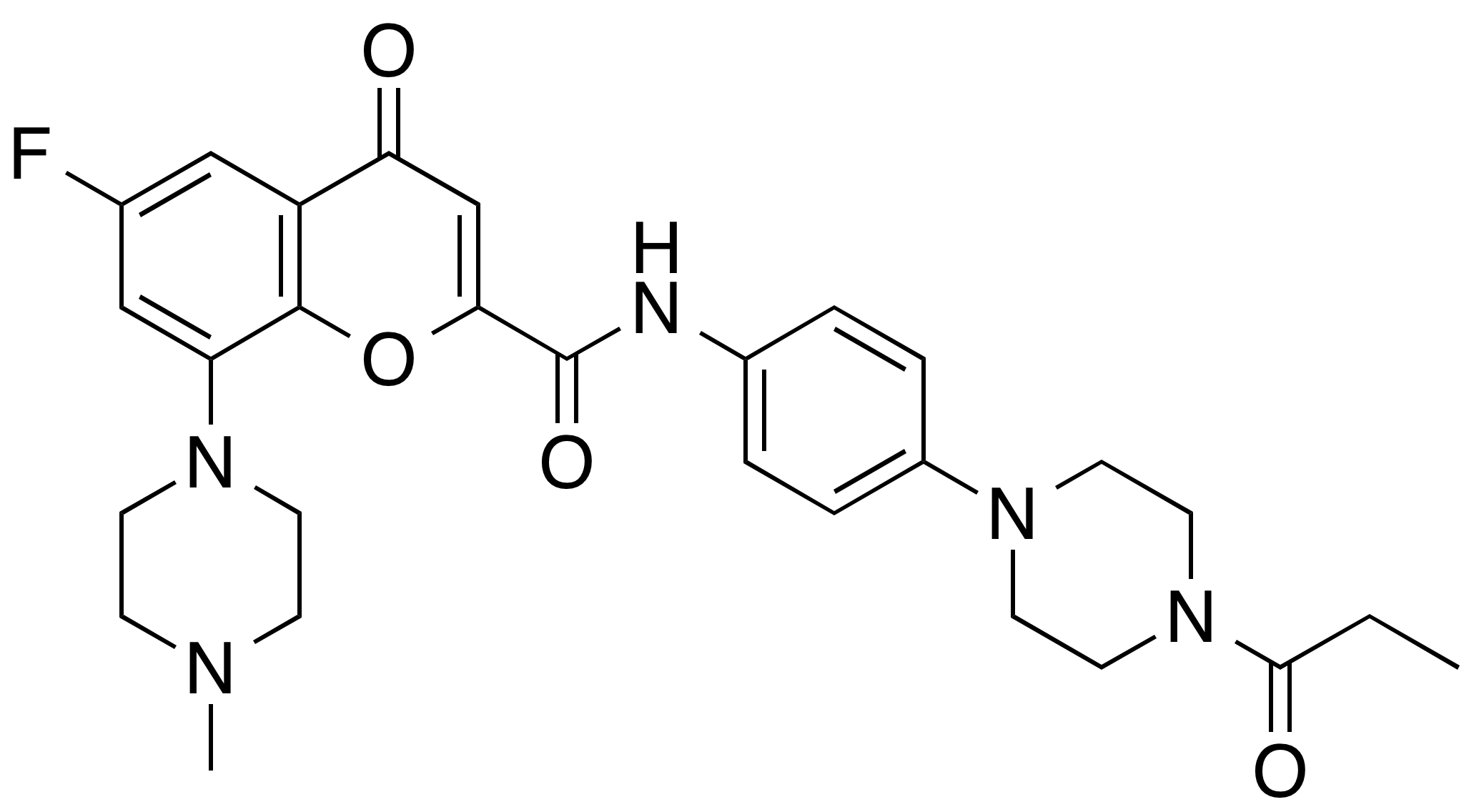

Clinical data
- Routes of administration: Unspecified
- Drug class: Serotonin 5-HT_{1B} receptor antagonist

Identifiers
- IUPAC name: 6-fluoro-8-(4-methylpiperazin-1-yl)-4-oxo-N-[4-(4-propanoylpiperazin-1-yl)phenyl]chromene-2-carboxamide
- CAS Number: 442548-99-4
- PubChem CID: 9830790
- ChemSpider: 8006524
- UNII: GR7FP8T3TF
- ChEMBL: ChEMBL602674

Chemical and physical data
- Formula: C_{28}H_{32}FN_{5}O_{4}
- Molar mass: 521.593 g·mol^{−1}
- 3D model (JSmol): Interactive image
- SMILES: CCC(=O)N1CCN(CC1)C2=CC=C(C=C2)NC(=O)C3=CC(=O)C4=C(O3)C(=CC(=C4)F)N5CCN(CC5)C
- InChI: InChI=1S/C28H32FN5O4/c1-3-26(36)34-14-12-32(13-15-34)21-6-4-20(5-7-21)30-28(37)25-18-24(35)22-16-19(29)17-23(27(22)38-25)33-10-8-31(2)9-11-33/h4-7,16-18H,3,8-15H2,1-2H3,(H,30,37); Key:CKBARMWSFIJZTL-UHFFFAOYSA-N

AZD-1134 is an investigational new drug that was being evaluated for the treatment of major depressive disorder and anxiety disorders but was never marketed.

== Pharmacology ==
AZD-1134 is a selective serotonin 5-HT_{1B} receptor antagonist. It has been found to increase serotonin levels in the dorsal hippocampus in animals and to increase serotonin turnover (as measured by 5-HIAA/serotonin ratio) in the cerebral cortex, hypothalamus, hippocampus, and striatum. Alone, AZD-1134 increased hippocampal serotonin levels to 179% of baseline, and in combination with the selective serotonin reuptake inhibitor (SSRI) citalopram, it increased levels to 950% of baseline. The increases in serotonin levels and turnover with AZD-1134 are presumably due to blockade of inhibitory presynaptic 5-HT_{1B} autoreceptors. AZD-1134 administered alone produced antidepressant-like effects in animals.

== History ==
AZD-1134 reached preclinical research prior to the discontinuation of its development. It was under development by AstraZeneca. Another selective serotonin 5-HT_{1B} receptor antagonist, AZD-3783, was also subsequently developed and studied by AstraZeneca. However, this drug was later found to produce unexpected neurotoxicity.
