= 5-HT-moduline =

Clinical data
- Other names: 5-HT-moduline; Serotonin-moduline; Leu-Ser-Ala-Leu; LSAL; leucyl-seryl-alanyl-leucine
- Drug class: Serotonin 5-HT_{1B} and 5-HT_{1D} receptor negative allosteric modulator

Identifiers
- IUPAC name: (2S)-2-[[(2S)-2-[[(2S)-2-[[(2S)-2-amino-4-methylpentanoyl]amino]-3-hydroxypropanoyl]amino]propanoyl]amino]-4-methylpentanoic acid
- CAS Number: 169249-03-0
- PubChem CID: 7048566
- ChemSpider: 5408801
- CompTox Dashboard (EPA): DTXSID20427573

Chemical and physical data
- Formula: C_{18}H_{34}N_{4}O_{6}
- Molar mass: 402.492 g·mol^{−1}
- 3D model (JSmol): Interactive image
- SMILES: C[C@@H](C(=O)N[C@@H](CC(C)C)C(=O)O)NC(=O)[C@H](CO)NC(=O)[C@H](CC(C)C)N
- InChI: InChI=1S/C18H34N4O6/c1-9(2)6-12(19)16(25)22-14(8-23)17(26)20-11(5)15(24)21-13(18(27)28)7-10(3)4/h9-14,23H,6-8,19H2,1-5H3,(H,20,26)(H,21,24)(H,22,25)(H,27,28)/t11-,12-,13-,14-/m0/s1; Key:IMIVWAUMTAIVPJ-XUXIUFHCSA-N

5-Hydroxytryptamine-moduline, also known as 5-HT-moduline or serotonin-moduline as well as Leu-Ser-Ala-Leu (LSAL), is an endogenous neuropeptide and high-affinity serotonin 5-HT_{1B} and 5-HT_{1D} receptor negative allosteric modulator. It is produced in the brain and is co-localized with serotonin 5-HT_{1B} receptor-expressing neurons. The compound has been shown to induce desensitization of serotonin 5-HT_{1B} receptors. It has been found to increase dopamine release in the striatum in rodents. By inhibiting serotonin 5-HT_{1B} autoreceptors, 5-HT-moduline disinhibits serotonin release and may have antidepressant potential. Antibodies and small-molecule antagonists against 5-HT-moduline like HG1 have been found to produce anxiolytic-like effects in rodents. 5-HT-moduline was first described in the scientific literature by 1996. Analogues of 5-HT-moduline have been studied.
