= Piquindone =

Chemical compound

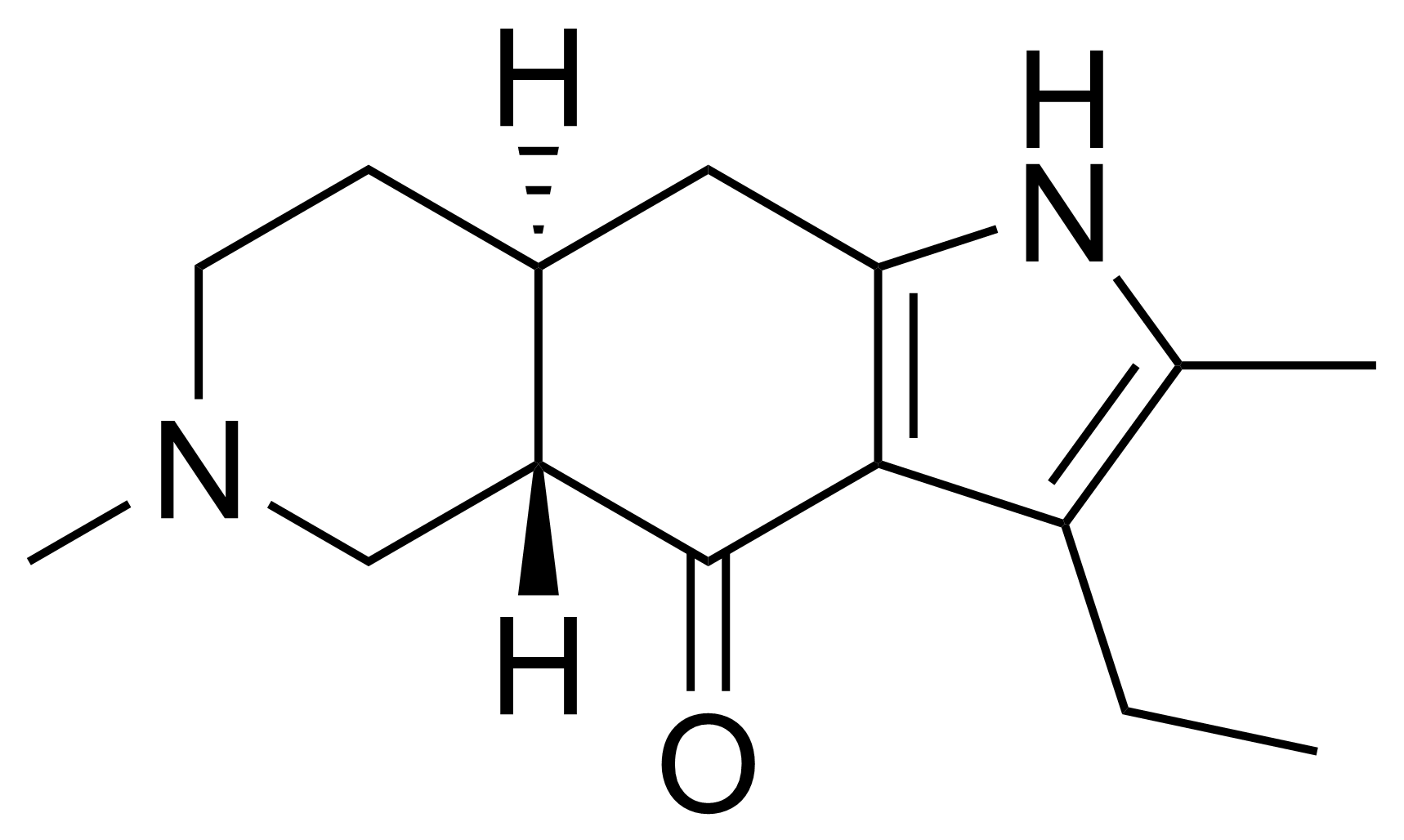

Clinical data
- Routes of administration: Oral
- ATC code: none

Legal status
- Legal status: In general: uncontrolled

Identifiers
- IUPAC name: (4aS,8aS)-3-ethyl-2,6-dimethyl-1,4a,5,6,7,8,8a,9-octahydro-4H-pyrrolo[2,3-g]isoquinolin-4-one
- CAS Number: 78541-97-6 83784-19-4 (hydrochloride)
- PubChem CID: 121903
- ChemSpider: 108751
- UNII: O1C9WXY65C
- ChEMBL: ChEMBL1192678
- CompTox Dashboard (EPA): DTXSID701016495

Chemical and physical data
- Formula: C_{15}H_{22}N_{2}O
- Molar mass: 246.354 g·mol^{−1}
- 3D model (JSmol): Interactive image
- SMILES: O=C2c1c([nH]c(c1CC)C)C[C@H]3[C@H]2CN(CC3)C

Piquindone (Ro 22-1319) is an atypical antipsychotic with a tricyclic structure that was developed in the 1980s but was never marketed. It acts as a selective D_{2} receptor antagonist, though based on its effects profile its selectivity may be considered controversial. Unlike most other D_{2} receptor ligands, piquindone displays Na^{+}-dependent binding, a property it shares with tropapride, zetidoline, and metoclopramide.

In clinical trials piquindone was found to possess moderate efficacy in treating positive symptoms of schizophrenia, and notably, was also modestly effective for negative symptoms, though this was just under statistical significance. Additionally, relative to haloperidol, it was found to possesses significantly fewer extrapyramidal symptoms and had a much lower propensity for inducing tardive dyskinesia, indicating its atypical nature. In addition to psychosis, piquindone has also been found to be effective in the treatment of Tourette's syndrome in numerous clinical studies.

== See also ==
- Losindole
- Molindone
