= List of investigational agitation drugs =

This is a list of investigational agitation drugs, or drugs that are currently under development for clinical use in the treatment of agitation, for instance in people with dementia or autism, but are not yet approved.

Chemical/generic names are listed first, with developmental code names, synonyms, and brand names in parentheses.

This list was last comprehensively updated in February 2025. It is likely to become outdated with time.

== Under development ==
=== Phase 3 ===
- Aripiprazole (Abilify) – atypical antipsychotic (non-selective monoamine receptor modulator)
- Deudextromethorphan/quinidine (AVP-786; CTP-786; d-DM) – sigma σ_{1} receptor agonist, serotonin reuptake inhibitor, ionotropic glutamate NMDA receptor antagonist, other actions, and CYP2D6 inhibitor combination
- Masupirdine (SUVN502; SVN-502) – serotonin 5-HT_{6} receptor antagonist

=== Phase 2/3 ===
- Deramciclane (EXV-801) – serotonin 5-HT_{2A} receptor antagonist, serotonin 5-HT_{2C} receptor inverse agonist, GABA reuptake inhibitor, and weak CYP2D6 inhibitor
- Deramciclane/dextromethorphan (EXV-802; Deraphan) combination of deramciclane (serotonin 5-HT_{2A} receptor antagonist, serotonin 5-HT_{2C} receptor inverse agonist, GABA reuptake inhibitor, and weak CYP2D6 inhibitor) and dextromethorphan (sigma σ_{1} receptor agonist, serotonin reuptake inhibitor, ionotropic glutamate NMDA receptor antagonist, other actions)

=== Phase 2 ===
- Cyclobenzaprine (KRL-102; TNX-102; Tonmya) – tricyclic antidepressant (monoamine reuptake inhibitor and monoamine receptor modulator)
- Deulumateperone (ITI-1284; lumateperone deuterated) – atypical antipsychotic (non-selective monoamine receptor modulator)
- Dexmedetomidine transdermal patch (DMTS; TPU-006) – α_{2}-adrenergic receptor agonist
- Dronabinol/palmidrol (THC/PEA; SCI-110; THX OSA01; THX RS01; THX-110; THX-TS01) – cannabinoid receptor modulator and other actions combination
- Irafamdastat (BMS-986368; CC-97489) – dual fatty acid amide hydrolase (FAAH) inhibitor and monoacylglycerol lipase (MAGL) inhibitor
- KNX-100 (SOC-1) – 15-lipoxygenase (15-LOX; ALOX15) inhibitor and oxytocin-like drug or indirect oxytocin receptor modulator
- ONO-2020 – immunomodulator and inflammation modulator – specifically for agitation in Alzheimer's disease
- Pimavanserin (ACP-103; BVF-048; Nuplazid) – serotonin 5-HT_{2A} receptor antagonist/inverse agonist
- SAL-0114 – undefined mechanism of action
- Soclenicant (BNC-210; IW-2143; L-isoleucyl-L-tryptophan) – α_{7} nicotinic acetylcholine receptor negative allosteric modulator

=== Phase 1 ===
- Dexmedetomidine sublingual (iXB-120) – α_{2}-adrenergic receptor agonist
- NMRA-511 (BTRX-323511; NMRA-323511) – vasopressin V_{1A} receptor antagonist
- SEP-380135 – undefined mechanism of action

=== Preclinical ===
- KNX-101 – 15-lipoxygenase (15-LOX; ALOX15) inhibitor

== Not under development ==
=== No development reported ===
- Cannabidiol (RLS-102) – cannabinoid receptor modulator
- Scyllo-inositol – β-amyloid inhibitor – specifically for agitation in Alzheimer's disease
- Zolmitriptan (ML-004) – serotonin 5-HT_{1B} and 5-HT_{1D} receptor agonist

=== Suspended ===
- Latrepirdine (BXCL-502) – various actions

=== Discontinued ===
- ALKS-7119 ((9α,13α)-17-methylmorphinan-3-carboxamide; dextromethorphan analogue) – serotonin reuptake inhibitor and μ-opioid, α_{1A}-adrenergic, α_{1B}-adrenergic, NMDA, and sigma σ_{1} receptor modulator
- Dextromethorphan/quinidine (AVP-923; Neurodex; Nuedexta; Zenvia) – sigma σ_{1} receptor agonist, serotonin reuptake inhibitor, ionotropic glutamate NMDA receptor antagonist, other actions, and CYP2D6 inhibitor combination
- Mibampator (LY-451395) – ionotropic glutamate AMPA receptor positive allosteric modulator
- Olanzapine intranasal (INP-105; POD™ olanzapine) – atypical antipsychotic (non-selective monoamine receptor modulator)

== Clinically used drugs ==
=== Approved drugs ===
==== Antipsychotics ====
- Brexpiprazole (Rexulti) – atypical antipsychotic (non-selective monoamine receptor modulator)
- Loxapine inhalation (Adasuve; ALXZ-004; AZ-004; Staccato Loxapine) – antipsychotic (non-selective monoamine receptor modulator)
- Paliperidone (Invega) – atypical antipsychotic (non-selective monoamine receptor modulator)

==== Others ====
- Bupropion/dextromethorphan (AXS-05; Auvelity) – sigma σ_{1} receptor agonist, serotonin reuptake inhibitor, norepinephrine and dopamine reuptake inhibitor, nicotinic acetylcholine receptor negative allosteric modulator, ionotropic glutamate NMDA receptor antagonist, other actions, and CYP2D6 inhibitor combination
- Dexmedetomidine (Igalmi) – α_{2}-adrenergic receptor agonist

=== Off-label drugs ===
- Benzodiazepines (GABA_{A} receptor positive allosteric modulators) (e.g., diazepam, lorazepam, midazolam)
- Beta blockers (β-adrenergic receptor antagonists) (e.g., propranolol, pindolol, nadolol)
- Cannabinoids (cannabinoid receptor agonists) (e.g., cannabis, dronabinol, nabilone)
- Dissociative anesthetics (NMDA receptor antagonists) (e.g., ketamine)

== See also ==
- List of investigational drugs
- List of investigational aggression drugs
- List of investigational antipsychotics
- List of investigational autism and pervasive developmental disorder drugs
