= SB-224289 =

Clinical data
- Other names: SB224289
- Drug class: Serotonin 5-HT_{1B} receptor antagonist or inverse agonist

Identifiers
- IUPAC name: [4-[2-methyl-4-(5-methyl-1,2,4-oxadiazol-3-yl)phenyl]phenyl]-(1'-methylspiro[6,7-dihydro-2H-furo[2,3-f]indole-3,4'-piperidine]-5-yl)methanone
- CAS Number: 180083-23-2
- PubChem CID: 3378093
- DrugBank: DB17052
- ChemSpider: 2623391
- UNII: F95C648W4N
- ChEBI: CHEBI:64069
- ChEMBL: ChEMBL281350
- CompTox Dashboard (EPA): DTXSID4043987

Chemical and physical data
- Formula: C_{32}H_{32}N_{4}O_{3}
- Molar mass: 520.633 g·mol^{−1}
- 3D model (JSmol): Interactive image
- SMILES: CC1=C(C=CC(=C1)C2=NOC(=N2)C)C3=CC=C(C=C3)C(=O)N4CCC5=CC6=C(C=C54)C7(CCN(CC7)C)CO6
- InChI: InChI=1S/C32H32N4O3/c1-20-16-25(30-33-21(2)39-34-30)8-9-26(20)22-4-6-23(7-5-22)31(37)36-13-10-24-17-29-27(18-28(24)36)32(19-38-29)11-14-35(3)15-12-32/h4-9,16-18H,10-15,19H2,1-3H3; Key:ATQMRMGXINTJHV-UHFFFAOYSA-N

SB-224289 is a selective serotonin 5-HT_{1B} receptor antagonist or inverse agonist which is used in scientific research. It is more than 75-fold selective for the serotonin 5-HT_{1B} receptor over all other serotonin receptors. The drug indirectly increases serotonin release by blocking inhibitory serotonin 5-HT_{1B} autoreceptors. In addition to its serotonin 5-HT_{1B} receptor antagonism, SB-224289 has subsequently been found to counteract the antifungal effects of the marine depsipeptide papuamide A.
