= SB-236057 =

Chemical compound

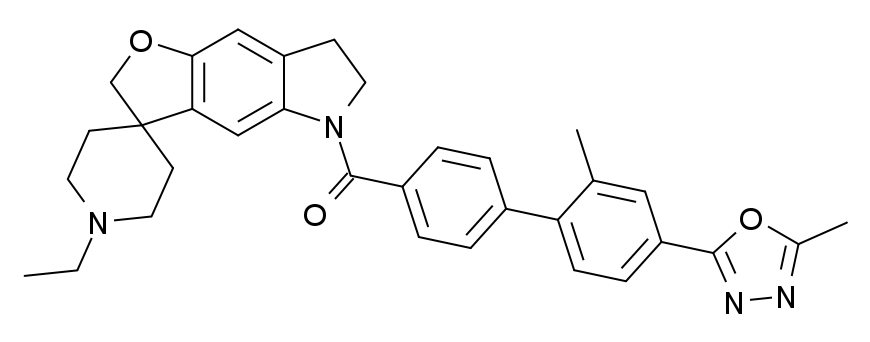

Clinical data
- Other names: SB236057; SB-236057-A; SB-236057A; SB236057A
- Routes of administration: Oral
- Drug class: Serotonin 5-HT_{1B} receptor inverse agonist
- ATC code: None

Identifiers
- IUPAC name: 1'-ethyl-5-[2'-methyl-4'-(5-methyl-1,3,4-oxadiazolyl-2-yl)biphenyl-4-carbonyl]-2,3,6,7-tetrahydrospiro(furo[2,3-f]indole-3,4'-piperidine)
- CAS Number: 180083-49-2
- PubChem CID: 5311426
- IUPHAR/BPS: 3231
- ChemSpider: 4470914
- UNII: 6W25PBE4MD
- ChEMBL: ChEMBL1628625
- CompTox Dashboard (EPA): DTXSID0047321

Chemical and physical data
- Formula: C_{33}H_{34}N_{4}O_{3}
- Molar mass: 534.660 g·mol^{−1}
- 3D model (JSmol): Interactive image
- SMILES: n5nc(C)oc5-c(cc2C)ccc2-c6ccc(cc6)C(=O)N(CCc1cc3OC7)c1cc3C7(CC4)CCN4CC
- InChI: InChI=1S/C33H34N4O3/c1-4-36-15-12-33(13-16-36)20-39-30-18-25-11-14-37(29(25)19-28(30)33)32(38)24-7-5-23(6-8-24)27-10-9-26(17-21(27)2)31-35-34-22(3)40-31/h5-10,17-19H,4,11-16,20H2,1-3H3; Key:WXAKEEQOWUHGCI-UHFFFAOYSA-N

SB-236057 is a compound which is a potent and selective inverse agonist for the serotonin receptor 5-HT_{1B}, acting especially at 5-HT_{1B} autoreceptors on nerve terminals. It produces a rapid increase in serotonin levels in the brain, and was originally researched as a potential antidepressant. However subsequent research found that SB-236,057 also acts as a potent teratogen, producing severe musculoskeletal birth defects when rodents were exposed to it during pregnancy. This has made it of little use for research into its original applications, yet has made it useful for studying embryonic development instead. The drug was under development by GlaxoSmithKline for the treatment of major depressive disorder in the 2000s and reached the preclinical research stage of development but was never marketed.

== See also ==
- List of investigational antidepressants
- AR-A000002
- GR-55562
- GR-127935
- SB-216641
