= BRL-15572 =

Chemical compound

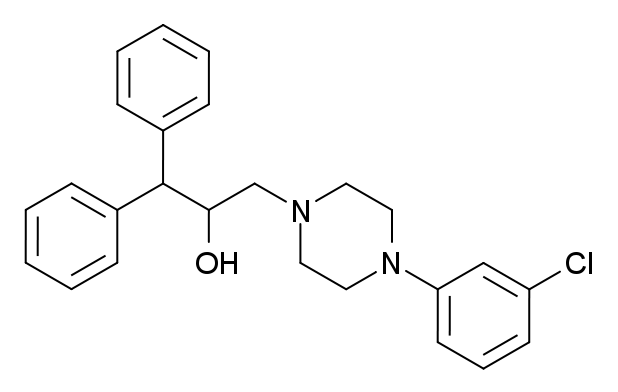

Clinical data
- ATC code: none

Identifiers
- IUPAC name: 3-(4-(3-chlorophenyl)piperazin-1-yl)-1,1-diphenyl-2-propanol
- CAS Number: 193611-72-2
- PubChem CID: 3654103
- IUPHAR/BPS: 10
- ChemSpider: 2887678
- UNII: X83G4TN8JZ
- ChEMBL: ChEMBL534232
- CompTox Dashboard (EPA): DTXSID4043983

Chemical and physical data
- Formula: C_{25}H_{27}ClN_{2}O
- Molar mass: 406.95 g·mol^{−1}
- 3D model (JSmol): Interactive image
- SMILES: Clc2cccc(c2)N1CCN(CC1)CC(O)C(c3ccccc3)c4ccccc4

BRL-15,572 is a drug which acts as a selective antagonist for the serotonin receptor subtype 5-HT_{1D}, with around 60x selectivity over other related receptors. The 5-HT_{1D} receptor has a very similar pharmacology to the closely related 5-HT_{1B} receptor, and most older ligands for these receptors bind to both subtypes with approximately equal affinity, so development of compounds such as BRL-15572 which are able to selectively block the 5-HT_{1D} subtype while leaving 5-HT_{1B} unaffected, have been a significant advance which has helped scientists in researching the function of these serotonin receptor subtypes. One function of the 5-HT_{1D} receptor this research has revealed is its role in modulating release of the neurotransmitter glutamate in the brain, as well as functions in regulation of cerebral blood pressure which are important in the pathogenesis of migraine headaches.
