= Masupirdine =

Chemical compound

Identifiers
- IUPAC name: 1-(2-bromophenyl)sulfonyl-5-methoxy-3-[(4-methylpiperazin-1-yl)methyl]indole
- PubChem CID: 10073773
- DrugBank: DB06140
- ChemSpider: 8249313
- UNII: 8XZ281AO3G
- ChEMBL: ChEMBL4117187

Chemical and physical data
- Formula: C_{21}H_{24}BrN_{3}O_{3}S
- Molar mass: 478.41 g·mol^{−1}
- 3D model (JSmol): Interactive image
- SMILES: CN1CCN(CC1)CC2=CN(C3=C2C=C(C=C3)OC)S(=O)(=O)C4=CC=CC=C4Br
- InChI: InChI=1S/C21H24BrN3O3S/c1-23-9-11-24(12-10-23)14-16-15-25(20-8-7-17(28-2)13-18(16)20)29(26,27)21-6-4-3-5-19(21)22/h3-8,13,15H,9-12,14H2,1-2H3; Key:GWCYPEHWIZXYFZ-UHFFFAOYSA-N

Masupirdine is an investigational new drug that is being evaluated for the treatment of agitation in Alzheimer's dementia. It is a selective 5-HT_{6} receptor antagonist.

== See also ==
- List of investigational agitation drugs
- List of investigational antipsychotics
- List of investigational cognition and memory disorder drugs
- List of investigational Parkinson's disease drugs
