= Anpirtoline =

Clinical data
- Other names: D-16949; 6-Chloro-2-[piperidinyl-4-thio]pyridine
- Drug class: Serotonin receptor modulator Serotonin 5-HT_{1B} receptor agonist

Identifiers
- IUPAC name: 2-chloro-6-piperidin-4-ylsulfanylpyridine
- CAS Number: 98330-05-3
- PubChem CID: 65854
- ChemSpider: 59266
- UNII: 32K9S228IK
- ChEBI: CHEBI:92968
- ChEMBL: ChEMBL1316374
- CompTox Dashboard (EPA): DTXSID7045659

Chemical and physical data
- Formula: C_{10}H_{13}ClN_{2}S
- Molar mass: 228.74 g·mol^{−1}
- 3D model (JSmol): Interactive image
- SMILES: C1CNCCC1SC2=NC(=CC=C2)Cl
- InChI: InChI=1S/C10H13ClN2S/c11-9-2-1-3-10(13-9)14-8-4-6-12-7-5-8/h1-3,8,12H,4-7H2; Key:GGALEXMXDMUMDM-UHFFFAOYSA-N

Anpirtoline (INN; developmental code name D-16949), also known as 2-chloro-6-piperidin-4-ylsulfanylpyridine, is a serotonin receptor modulator which was under development for the treatment of major depressive disorder (MDD) and pain but was never marketed.

== Pharmacology ==
=== Pharmacodynamics ===
It is a serotonin 5-HT_{1B} and 5-HT_{1D} receptor agonist, a serotonin 5-HT_{1A} receptor ligand, a serotonin 5-HT_{3} receptor antagonist, and also binds to the serotonin 5-HT_{2} receptors with weak affinity. However, it acts preferentially as a serotonin 5-HT_{1B} receptor agonist and is sometimes described as being selective in this action. It causes a decrease in serotonin synthesis and a reduction in aggressive behavior.

The drug is primarily used for research purposes due to its receptor agonist and receptor antagonist properties. Studies involving social instigation, aggression, and other behavioral traits make ample use of the compound.

== Chemistry ==
Anpirtoline is a synthetic compound. The hydrochloride salt appears as a white solid at room temperature and is soluble in water and DMSO. It has a density of 1.27 g/cm^{3} and a molar mass of 265.20. Structurally, the most notable parts of anpirtoline hydrochloride are two six-membered rings bonded via a sulfur atom. The melting point of anpirtoline hydrochloride is 126-128 °C. The flash point of the compound is 174 °C. Many of Anpirtoline hydrochloride's chemical properties remain unknown or untested.

== See also ==
- Serotonin 5-HT_{1B} receptor agonist
