= AZ10419369 =

Clinical data
- Other names: AZ-10419369
- Drug class: Serotonin 5-HT_{1B} receptor agonist
- ATC code: None

Identifiers
- IUPAC name: 5-methyl-8-(4-methylpiperazin-1-yl)-N-(4-morpholin-4-ylphenyl)-4-oxochromene-2-carboxamide
- CAS Number: 442548-93-8
- PubChem CID: 23533297
- IUPHAR/BPS: 3926
- UNII: SU46MTA7D5
- ChEMBL: ChEMBL5222828

Chemical and physical data
- Formula: C_{26}H_{30}N_{4}O_{4}
- Molar mass: 462.550 g·mol^{−1}
- 3D model (JSmol): Interactive image
- SMILES: CC1=C2C(=O)C=C(OC2=C(C=C1)N3CCN(CC3)C)C(=O)NC4=CC=C(C=C4)N5CCOCC5
- InChI: InChI=1S/C26H30N4O4/c1-18-3-8-21(30-11-9-28(2)10-12-30)25-24(18)22(31)17-23(34-25)26(32)27-19-4-6-20(7-5-19)29-13-15-33-16-14-29/h3-8,17H,9-16H2,1-2H3,(H,27,32); Key:JKPWOPNZKYPRPZ-UHFFFAOYSA-N

AZ10419369 is a potent and selective serotonin 5-HT_{1B} receptor agonist (K_{i} = 0.8 nM) which is used in scientific research. A radiolabeled form, [^{11}C]-AZ10419369, is one of two serotonin 5-HT_{1B} receptor ligands used in positron emission tomography (PET) imaging, including in both animal and human studies. AZ10419369 was first described in the scientific literature by 2008.

== See also ==
- Serotonin 5-HT_{1B} receptor agonist
