= Molindone =

Antipsychotic medication

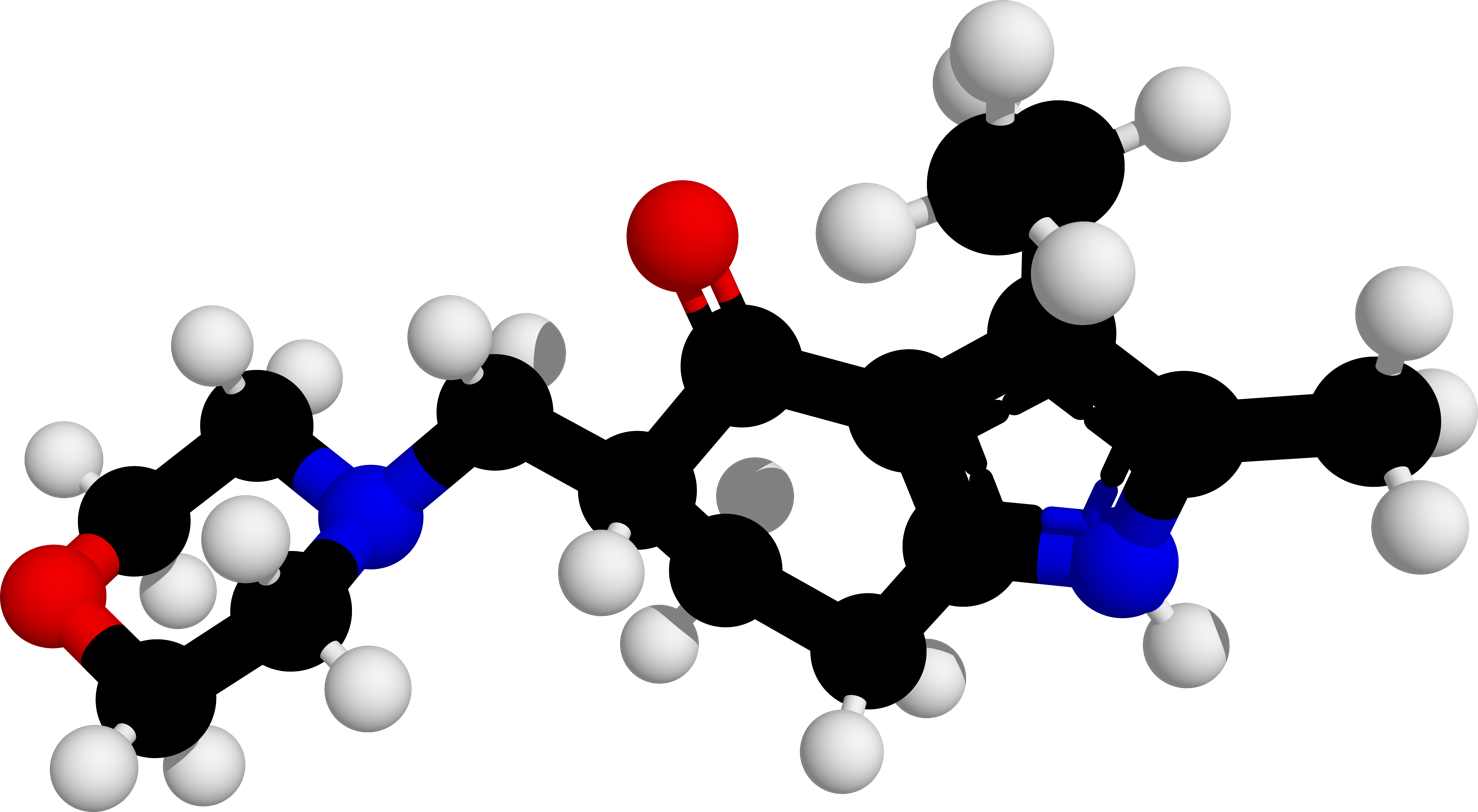

Clinical data
- Pronunciation: /moʊˈlɪndoʊn/ moh-LIN-dohn
- Trade names: Moban
- Other names: EN-1733 A; EN1773-A; EN1773A
- AHFS/Drugs.com: Consumer Drug Information
- MedlinePlus: a682238
- Pregnancy category: C
- Routes of administration: By mouth (tablets)
- Drug class: Typical antipsychotic
- ATC code: N05AE02 (WHO)

Legal status
- Legal status: US: ℞-only

Pharmacokinetic data
- Metabolism: Hepatic
- Elimination half-life: 2 hours
- Duration of action: 24–36 hours
- Excretion: Minor, renal and fecal

Identifiers
- IUPAC name: 3-Ethyl-2-methyl-5-(morpholin-4-ylmethyl)- 1,5,6,7-tetrahydro-4H-indol-4-one
- CAS Number: 7416-34-4
- PubChem CID: 23897
- IUPHAR/BPS: 207
- DrugBank: DB01618
- ChemSpider: 22342
- UNII: RT3Y3QMF8N
- KEGG: D08226
- ChEMBL: ChEMBL460
- CompTox Dashboard (EPA): DTXSID9023332
- ECHA InfoCard: 100.254.109

Chemical and physical data
- Formula: C_{16}H_{24}N_{2}O_{2}
- Molar mass: 276.380 g·mol^{−1}
- 3D model (JSmol): Interactive image
- SMILES: O=C2c1c(c([nH]c1CCC2CN3CCOCC3)C)CC
- InChI: InChI=1S/C16H24N2O2/c1-3-13-11(2)17-14-5-4-12(16(19)15(13)14)10-18-6-8-20-9-7-18/h12,17H,3-10H2,1-2H3; Key:KLPWJLBORRMFGK-UHFFFAOYSA-N

Molindone, sold under the brand name Moban, is an antipsychotic medication which is used in the United States in the treatment of schizophrenia. It is taken by mouth.

Side effects of molindone include extrapyramidal symptoms and tardive dyskinesia, among others. Molindone is thought to work by blocking the effects of dopamine in the brain, leading to diminished symptoms of psychosis. The drug is sometimes described as a typical antipsychotic, and sometimes described as an atypical antipsychotic. Chemically, molindone is an indole and is structurally distinct from many other antipsychotics.

Molindone was first described by 1966 and was introduced for medical use in 1974. It remains marketed only in the United States. The drug has been repurposed and is being developed for potential treatment of aggression in children and adolescents with attention deficit hyperactivity disorder (ADHD).

== Medical uses ==
Molindone is used in the treatment of schizophrenia.

=== Available forms ===
Molindone is available in the form of 5, 10, 25, and 50 mg oral tablets.

== Adverse effects ==
The side effect profile of molindone is similar to that of other typical antipsychotics. This includes extrapyramidal symptoms and tardive dyskinesia. Unlike most antipsychotics, however, molindone use is associated with decreased appetite and weight loss rather than with weight gain. Molindone may have less potential for sedation than certain other antipsychotics owing to its lack of antihistamine activity. It has little or no anticholinergic activity and may be less likely than certain other antipsychotics to cause orthostatic hypotension.

== Pharmacology ==
=== Pharmacodynamics ===
Molindone is known to act as a potent antagonist of the dopamine D_{2} receptor (IC_{50} = 84–140 nM) and of the serotonin 5-HT_{2B} receptor (IC_{50} = 410 nM). It is far less potent as an antagonist of the dopamine D_{1}, D_{3}, and D_{5} receptors (IC_{50} = 3,200–8,300 nM) and of the serotonin 5-HT_{2A} receptor (IC_{50} = 14,000 nM). The drug does not significantly bind to or inhibit the α-adrenergic receptors, nor does it affect various other receptors, such as the serotonin 5-HT_{1A}, 5-HT_{2C}, 5-HT_{6}, and 5-HT_{7} receptors. Likewise, molindone has essentially no affinity for the muscarinic acetylcholine receptors and has very little affinity for the histamine H_{1} receptor or the α_{1}-adrenergic receptor. However, it has been found to have intermediate affinity for the α_{2}-adrenergic receptor. The metabolites of molindone appear to be largely inactive in vitro. The preceding findings suggest that molindone is pharmacologically distinct from most atypical antipsychotics, which act as potent antagonists of both the D_{2} and 5-HT_{2A} receptors.

Additional binding data on molindone are also available and in some cases have found contrasting results relative to the above findings, for instance high affinity for the dopamine D_{3} receptor.

Molindone is described as an antipsychotic, sedative, and major tranquilizer. In animals, it reduces spontaneous locomotor activity, inhibits conditioned avoidance responses, produces catalepsy and hypothermia, and limits aggression in monkeys. Like other antipsychotics, molindone antagonizes the effects of the dopamine releasing agent amphetamine and the dopamine receptor agonist apomorphine. In contrast to many antipsychotics however, molindone shows antidepressant-like effects in animals, for example reversing ptosis induced by the dopamine depleting agent tetrabenazine, potentiating 5-hydroxytryptophan (5-HTP)-induced tremors, and potentiating certain effects of levodopa (L-DOPA). It shows little anticholinergic activity in animals and its lack of histamine H_{1} receptor antagonism suggests less potential for sedation and weight gain than certain other antipsychotics. The drug shows antiemetic effects in animals.

Molindone has been reported to inhibit monoamine oxidase both in vitro and in vivo. However, very high concentrations (~100,000 nM) and high doses (10 and 40 mg/kg) are required for monoamine oxidase inhibition. Its inhibition of monoamine oxidase is irreversible and is selective for monoamine oxidase A (MAO-A). The drug is much more potent in inhibiting monoamine oxidase in vivo than in vitro, suggesting that an active metabolite may be responsible for its monoamine oxidase inhibition. The MAO-A inhibition of molindone may be responsible for its antidepressant-like effects in animals. It is unclear whether the monoamine oxidase inhibition of molindone observed in preclinical research occurs therapeutically in humans or is clinically significant.

It has no affinity for the muscarinic acetylcholine receptors.

=== Pharmacokinetics ===
The elimination half-life of molindone is approximately 2 hours. This half-life is much shorter than that of most other antipsychotics. Concentrations of molindone are negligible 12 hours following the last dose even it is used at high doses. Lithium has been found to prolong the half-life of molindone by at least 4-fold. In spite of the preceding findings, the duration of action of molindone is 24 to 36 hours. It has been suggested that the antipsychotic effects of molindone may be mediated by active metabolites rather than by molindone itself.

== Chemistry ==
Molindone is an indole derivative or dihydroindole and is structurally distinct from many other antipsychotics.

=== Analogues ===
Some structurally related compounds include L-741,626, losindole, and piquindone. Other indole-containing antipsychotics include ciclindole, flucindole, roxindole, sertindole, and tepirindole.

=== Synthesis ===
Patent: Newer patent:

Condensation of oximinoketone 2 (from nitrosation of 3-pentanone), with cyclohexane-1,3-dione (1) in the presence of zinc and acetic acid leads directly to the partly reduced indole derivative 6. The transformation may be rationalized by assuming as the first step, reduction of 2 to the corresponding α-aminoketone. Conjugate addition of the amine to 1 followed by elimination of hydroxide (as water) would give ene-aminoketone 3. This enamine may be assumed to be in tautomeric equilibrium with imine 4. Aldol condensation of the side chain carbonyl group with the doubly activated ring methylene group would then result in cyclization to pyrrole 5; simple tautomeric transformation would then give the observed product. Mannich reaction of 6 with formaldehyde and morpholine gives the tranquilizer molindone (7).

== History ==
Molindone was first described in the literature by 1966. It was first approved for medical use, to treat schizophrenia, in 1974 in the United States.

== Society and culture ==
=== Availability ===
Molindone has been marketed in the United States, Finland, and Hong Kong. In 2000, it was available only in these three countries. By 2017, molindone continued to be marketed only in the United States.

The drug was discontinued by its original supplier, Endo Pharmaceuticals, on January 13, 2010. After having been produced and subsequently discontinued by Core Pharma in 2015 to 2017, molindone is available again from Epic Pharma effective December 2018.

== Research ==
=== Depression and anxiety ===
Molindone has been studied in the treatment of depression and anxiety. Some antidepressant and anxiolytic effects have been observed in small and old clinical studies, but findings in terms of effectiveness were mixed.

=== Aggression in children and adolescents ===
Molindone was found to reduce aggressive symptoms, including agitation, hostility, and uncooperativeness, in adults with schizophrenia in the 1970s. Many other antipsychotics have also shown clinical anti-aggressive effects. Subsequently, molindone was found to potentially be effective in the treatment of hospitalized aggressive children with conduct disorder in a clinical trial comparing it with thioridazine in the 1980s. This study eventually led to molindone being developed for treatment of impulsive aggression in youth much later on.

Low-dose extended-release molindone (developmental code name SPN-810) is under development for the treatment of impulsive aggression in children and adolescents with attention deficit hyperactivity disorder (ADHD). As of May 2024, it is in phase 3 clinical trials for this indication. Negative effectiveness findings in a phase 3 trial have been reported. The exact mechanism of action of molindone for this indication is unknown, but has been proposed to be related to dopamine D_{2} and serotonin 5-HT_{2B} receptor antagonism.
