= Deudextromethorphan/quinidine =

Neurological and psychiatric drug

Combination of
- Deudextromethorphan: Sigma-1 receptor agonist, NMDA receptor antagonist, serotonin–norepinephrine reuptake inhibitor
- Quinidine: Antiarrhythmic agent, CYP2D6 inhibitor

Clinical data
- Other names: AVP-786; CTP-786; d-DM/Q; d6-DM/Q; d-DXM/Q; d6-DXM/Q
- Routes of administration: By mouth

Deudextromethorphan/quinidine (d-DXM/Q; developmental code names AVP-786, CTP-786) is a combination of deudextromethorphan (d-DXM; deuterated (d6) dextromethorphan (DXM)) and quinidine (Q) which is under development by Avanir Pharmaceuticals for the treatment of a variety of neurological and psychiatric indications. The pharmacological profile of d-DXM/Q is similar to that of dextromethorphan/quinidine (DXM/Q). DXM and d-DXM act as σ_{1} receptor agonists, NMDA receptor antagonists, and serotonin–norepinephrine reuptake inhibitors, among other actions, while quinidine is an antiarrhythmic agent acting as a CYP2D6 inhibitor. Quinidine inhibits the metabolism of DXM and d-DXM into dextrorphan (DXO), which has a different pharmacological profile from DXM. Deuteration of DXM hinders its metabolism by CYP2D6 into DXO, thereby allowing for lower doses of quinidine in the combination. This in turn allows for lower potential for drug interactions and cardiac adverse effects caused by quinidine. As of September 2020, d-DXM/Q is in phase 3 clinical trials for agitation, phase 2/3 trials for schizophrenia, and phase 2 trials for brain injuries, impulse control disorders, major depressive disorder, and neurodegenerative disorders.
