= LY-310762 =

Chemical compound

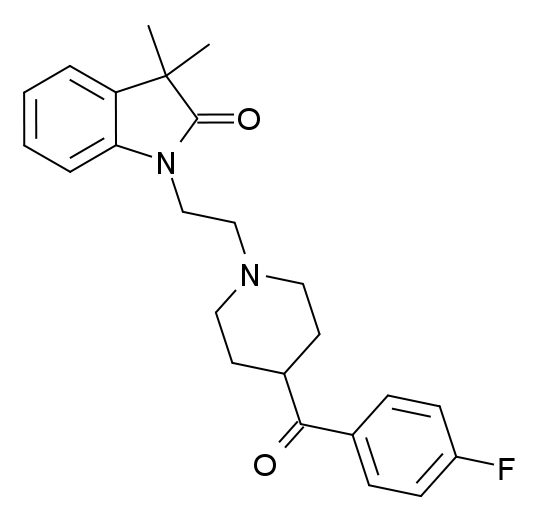

Identifiers
- IUPAC name: 3,3-Dimethyl-1-(2-[4-(4-fluorobenzoyl)piperidin-1-yl]-1-ethyl)-1,3-dihydro-2H-indol-2-one
- CAS Number: 192927-92-7
- PubChem CID: 4282258
- ChemSpider: 3488832
- UNII: BUX78WM9U2
- ChEBI: CHEBI:140937
- CompTox Dashboard (EPA): DTXSID701126571

Chemical and physical data
- Formula: C_{24}H_{27}FN_{2}O_{2}
- Molar mass: 394.490 g·mol^{−1}
- 3D model (JSmol): Interactive image
- SMILES: c3cc(F)ccc3C(=O)C2CCN(CC2)CCN1C(=O)C(C)(C)c4c1cccc4
- InChI: InChI=1S/C24H27FN2O2/c1-24(2)20-5-3-4-6-21(20)27(23(24)29)16-15-26-13-11-18(12-14-26)22(28)17-7-9-19(25)10-8-17/h3-10,18H,11-16H2,1-2H3; Key:KDXISMANFPJVJY-UHFFFAOYSA-N

LY-310762 is a drug which acts as a potent and selective antagonist for the 5-HT_{1D} serotonin receptor, with reasonable selectivity over the closely related 5-HT_{1B} subtype.
