= Batoprazine =

Chemical compound

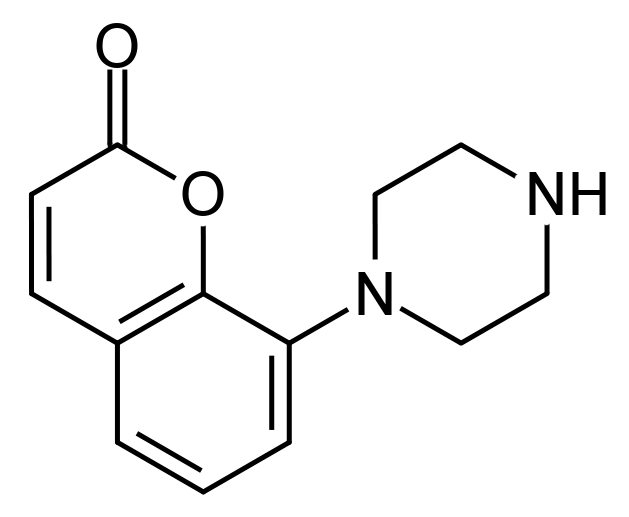

Clinical data
- Other names: 8-(1-piperazinyl)coumarin; 8-(1-piperazinyl)-2H-
- Routes of administration: Oral
- ATC code: none

Legal status
- Legal status: In general: uncontrolled

Identifiers
- IUPAC name: 8-(piperazin-1-yl)-2H-chromen-2-one
- CAS Number: 105685-11-8
- PubChem CID: 184839
- ChemSpider: 160706
- UNII: EZY3PL8Q0M
- ChEMBL: ChEMBL2104650
- CompTox Dashboard (EPA): DTXSID70147254

Chemical and physical data
- Formula: C_{13}H_{14}N_{2}O_{2}
- Molar mass: 230.267 g·mol^{−1}
- 3D model (JSmol): Interactive image
- SMILES: O=C/2Oc1c(cccc1\C=C\2)N3CCNCC3
- InChI: InChI=1S/C13H14N2O2/c16-12-5-4-10-2-1-3-11(13(10)17-12)15-8-6-14-7-9-15/h1-5,14H,6-9H2; Key:MTYYDFXUUJQQRS-UHFFFAOYSA-N

Batoprazine is a drug of the phenylpiperazine class which has been described as a serenic or antiaggressive agent. It acts as a 5-HT_{1A} and 5-HT_{1B} receptor agonist. It is closely related to eltoprazine, fluprazine, and naphthylpiperazine, of which possess similar actions and effects.

== See also ==
- List of investigational aggression drugs
