= AOP-208 =

Clinical data
- Other names: AOP208; LB-208; LB208
- Routes of administration: Oral
- Drug class: Serotonin 5-HT_{1B} receptor antagonist

AOP-208, also known as LB-208, is a selective serotonin 5-HT_{1B} receptor antagonist which is under development for the treatment of lymphoma, solid tumors, acute myeloid leukemia, and myelodysplastic syndromes. It is taken orally. The drug is being developed by AOP Orphan Pharmaceuticals AG and Leukos Biotech. As of October 2024, it is in phase 1 clinical trials for lymphoma and solid tumors and is in the preclinical research stage of development for acute myeloid leukemia and myelodysplastic syndromes. The chemical structure of AOP-208 does not yet appear to have been disclosed.
