= 5-HT1B receptor =

Mammalian protein found in Homo sapiens

HTR1B
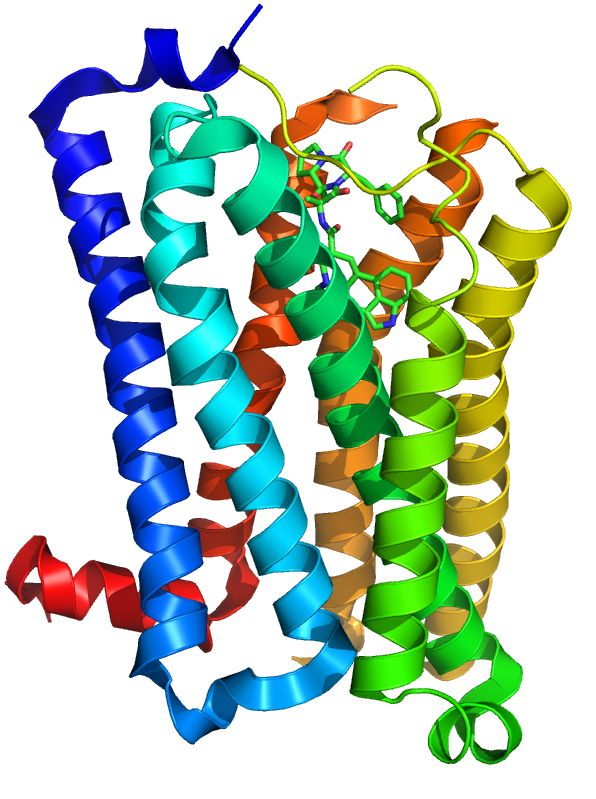

Identifiers
- Aliases: HTR1B, 5-HT1B, 5-HT1DB, HTR1D2, HTR1DB, S12, 5-HT-1B, 5-HT-1D-beta, 5-hydroxytryptamine receptor 1B
- External IDs: OMIM: 182131; MGI: 96274; GeneCards: HTR1B
Available structures
PDB	Ortholog search: PDBe RCSB
PDB	List of PDB id codes 4IAQ, 4IAR

Gene location (Human)
Chr.	Chromosome 6 (human)
Band	6q14.1	Start	77,460,924 bp
Band	6q14.1	End	77,463,491 bp

Gene location (Mouse)
Chr.	Chromosome 9 (mouse)
Band	9 E1|9 44.61 cM	Start	81,510,344 bp
Band	9 E1|9 44.61 cM	End	81,515,881 bp
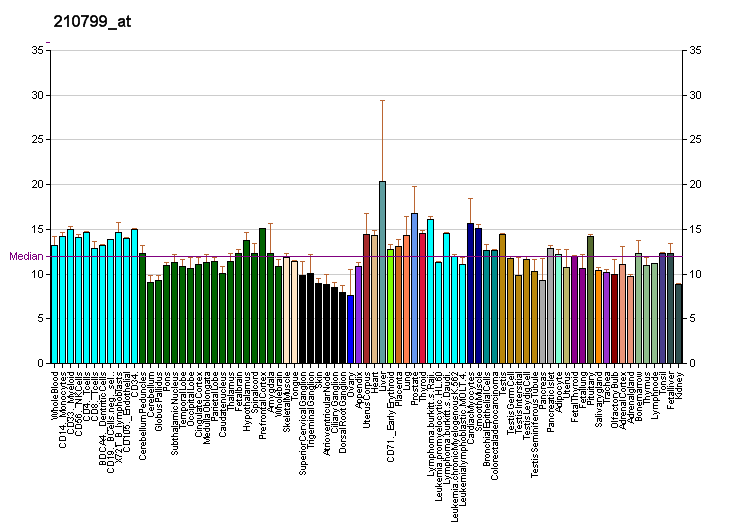
RNA expression pattern
Bgee	Human / Mouse (ortholog); Top expressed in: popliteal artery; tibial arteries; right coronary artery; Descending thoracic aorta; left coronary artery; ascending aorta; stromal cell of endometrium; prefrontal cortex; nucleus accumbens; caudate nucleus / Top expressed in: ventral nuclear group; ventral posteromedial nucleus; nucleus accumbens; ascending aorta; lumbar spinal ganglion; dorsal nucleus of lateral geniculate body; subthalamus; ventral posterolateral nucleus; paraventricular nucleus of thalamus; ventral lateral nucleus; More reference expression data
BioGPS	More reference expression data
Gene ontology
Molecular function	G protein-coupled receptor activity; signal transducer activity; G protein-coupled serotonin receptor activity; protein binding; neurotransmitter receptor activity; serotonin binding; voltage-gated calcium channel activity involved in regulation of presynaptic cytosolic calcium levels
Cellular component	cytoplasm; integral component of membrane; membrane; integral component of plasma membrane; plasma membrane; calyx of Held; integral component of presynaptic membrane; serotonergic synapse; dendrite
Biological process	chemical synaptic transmission; G protein-coupled receptor internalization; regulation of dopamine secretion; regulation of behavior; response to mineralocorticoid; vasoconstriction; adenylate cyclase-inhibiting serotonin receptor signaling pathway; G protein-coupled receptor signaling pathway, coupled to cyclic nucleotide second messenger; cellular response to alkaloid; negative regulation of serotonin secretion; cellular response to temperature stimulus; negative regulation of synaptic transmission, GABAergic; protein kinase C-activating G protein-coupled receptor signaling pathway; drinking behavior; bone remodeling; feeding behavior; response to ethanol; negative regulation of synaptic transmission, glutamatergic; signal transduction; response to cocaine; positive regulation of vascular associated smooth muscle cell proliferation; G protein-coupled receptor signaling pathway; adenylate cyclase-inhibiting G protein-coupled receptor signaling pathway; animal behavior; presynaptic modulation of chemical synaptic transmission; regulation of synaptic vesicle exocytosis; regulation of presynaptic cytosolic calcium ion concentration
Sources:Amigo / QuickGO
Orthologs
Databases	NCBI: entry; OMA: entry
Species	Human	Mouse
Entrez	3351	15551
Ensembl	ENSG00000135312	ENSMUSG00000049511
UniProt	P28222	P28334
RefSeq (mRNA)	NM_000863	NM_010482
RefSeq (protein)	NP_000854	NP_034612
Location (UCSC)	Chr 6: 77.46 – 77.46 Mb	Chr 9: 81.51 – 81.52 Mb
PubMed search
- Wikidata
View/Edit Human	View/Edit Mouse

5-hydroxytryptamine receptor 1B also known as the 5-HT_{1B} receptor is a protein that in humans is encoded by the HTR1B gene. The 5-HT_{1B} receptor is a 5-HT receptor subtype.

== Tissue distribution and function ==
5-HT_{1B} receptors are widely distributed throughout the central nervous system with the highest concentrations found in the frontal cortex, basal ganglia, striatum, and the hippocampus. The function of the 5-HT_{1B} receptor differs depending upon its location. In the frontal cortex, it is believed to act as a terminal receptor inhibiting the release of dopamine. In the basal ganglia and the striatum, evidence suggests 5-HT signaling acts on an autoreceptor, inhibiting the release of serotonin and decreasing glutamatergic transmission by reducing miniature excitatory postsynaptic potential (mEPSP) frequency, respectively. In the hippocampus, a recent study has demonstrated that activation of postsynaptic 5-HT_{1B} heteroreceptors produces a facilitation in excitatory synaptic transmission which is altered in depression. When the expression of 5-HT_{1B} in human cortex was traced throughout life, significant changes during adolescence were observed, in a way that is strongly correlated with the expression of 5-HT_{1E}.

Outside of the CNS, the 5-HT_{1B} receptor is also expressed on the endothelium of blood vessels, particularly in the meninges. Activation of these receptors results in vasoconstriction. The high distribution of vasoconstrictive 5-HT_{1B} and 5-HT_{1D} receptors around the brain makes them a valuable drug target for the treatment of migraines.

Blocking 5-HT_{1B} receptor signalling also increases the number of osteoblasts, bone mass, and the bone formation rate.

Knockout mice lacking the 5-HT_{1B} gene have been reported to have a higher preference for alcohol, although later studies failed to replicate such abnormalities in alcohol consumption. These mice have also been reported to have a lower measure of anxiety (such as on the elevated plus maze test) and a higher measure of aggression.

Under basal conditions, knockout mice present with a "normal" phenotype and exhibit a sucrose preference (lack of sucrose preference is considered a measure of anhedonia). However, after undergoing chronic unpredictable stress treatment to induce a "depression-like" phenotype these animals do not benefit from administration of selective serotonin reuptake inhibitor (SSRIs).

Activation of the serotonin 5-HT_{1B} receptor appears to mediate the prosocial effects of entactogens acting as serotonin releasing agents like MDMA in animals. In addition, serotonin 5-HT_{1B} receptor activation appears to mediate the locomotor hyperactivity of these agents. The serotonin 5-HT_{1B} receptor also appears to be required for the persisting antidepressant- and anxiolytic-like effects as well as acute hypolocomotion of the serotonergic psychedelic and non-selective serotonin receptor agonist psilocybin in animals.

== Ligands ==
=== Agonists ===
- (S)-DCPT
- 2ZEDMA (also a 5-HT_{2A} agonist)
- 5-Carboxamidotryptamine (5-CT)
- 5-MAPB
- 5-MAPBT
- 6-MAPB
- 6-MAPBT
- Almotriptan
- Anpirtoline (D-16949)
- Asenapine
- Avitriptan
- AZ10419369
- Batoprazine
- BK-5-MAPB
- BK-5-MAPBT
- BK-6-MAPB
- Bromocriptine
- CGS-12066 (CGS-12066A, CGS-12066B)
- CP-93,129
- CP-94,253
- CP-122,288 (mixed 5-HT_{1B/1D} agonist)
- CP-135,807 (mixed 5-HT_{1B/1D} agonist)
- Dihydroergotamine
- Donitriptan
- Eletriptan
- Eltoprazine (DU-28853)
- Emodin-8-glucoside
- Ergotamine
- Fluprazine
- Frovatriptan
- L-741604
- Lisuride
- mCPP
- MDMA
- Metergoline
- Methylergometrine (methylergonovine)
- Methylone
- Methysergide
- Naphthylpiperazine
- Naratriptan
- Oxymetazoline
- Pergolide
- PGI-7043
- PZKKN-94 (also a 5-HT_{6} antagonist)
- Rizatriptan
- RU-24969 (mixed 5-HT_{1A/1B} agonist)
- (S)-DCPT
- Serotonin
- Sumatriptan
- TFMPP
- Tryptamine psychedelics (e.g., 5-MeO-DMT, DPT, psilocin/psilocybin)
- Vortioxetine
- Ziprasidone
- Zolmitriptan

=== Antagonists ===
- Alprenolol
- AOP-208 (LB-208)
- AR-A000002 (AZD-8129)
- Aripiprazole
- AZD-1134
- AZD-3783 (AZ12320927)
- Carteolol
- Elzasonan
- F-12682
- F-14258
- GR-55562
- GR-127935
- Isamoltane (CGP-361A)
- LY-393558
- Metitepine (methiothepin)
- NAS-181 (MCOMM)
- Oxprenolol
- Penbutolol
- Propranolol
- Risperidone
- SB-216641
- SB-224289 (inverse agonist)
- SB-236057 (inverse agonist)
- SB-245570
- SB-272183
- SB-616234
- SB-649915
- Tertatolol
- Yohimbine

=== Negative allosteric modulators ===
- 5-HT-moduline

=== Unknown ===
- Dextromethorphan

== Genetics ==
In humans the protein is coded by the gene HTR1B.

A genetic variant in the promoter region, A-161T, has been examined with respect to personality traits and showed no major effect.

== See also ==
- 5-HT_{1} receptor
- 5-HT receptor
