= F-14258 =

Clinical data
- Other names: F14258
- Routes of administration: Oral
- Drug class: Serotonin 5-HT_{1B} receptor antagonist; Serotonin 5-HT_{1D} receptor antagonist
- ATC code: None

Identifiers
- CAS Number: 194942-63-7
- PubChem CID: 9845946
- ChemSpider: 8021660

Chemical and physical data
- Formula: C_{25}H_{35}N_{5}O_{2}
- Molar mass: 437.588 g·mol^{−1}
- 3D model (JSmol): Interactive image
- SMILES: O=C(NC1=CC=C(OC)C(=C1)N2CCN(C)CC2)N3CCN(CCC=4C=CC=CC4)CC3
- InChI: InChI=1S/C25H35N5O2/c1-27-12-16-29(17-13-27)23-20-22(8-9-24(23)32-2)26-25(31)30-18-14-28(15-19-30)11-10-21-6-4-3-5-7-21/h3-9,20H,10-19H2,1-2H3,(H,26,31); Key:SDXUUOUVEULXIO-UHFFFAOYSA-N

F-14258 is a serotonin 5-HT_{1B} and 5-HT_{1D} receptor antagonist which was under development for the treatment of major depressive disorder (MDD) and obsessive–compulsive disorder (OCD) but was never marketed. It is taken orally. The drug was under development by Pierre Fabre. It reached the preclinical research stage of development prior to its discontinuation around 2002.

== See also ==
- List of investigational antidepressants
- List of investigational obsessive–compulsive disorder drugs
- F-12682
