= F-12682 =

Clinical data
- Other names: F12682; F-12318; F12318
- Routes of administration: Unknown
- Drug class: Serotonin 5-HT_{1B} and 5-HT_{1D} receptor inverse agonist
- ATC code: None

Identifiers
- IUPAC name: N-[4-methoxy-3-(4-methylpiperazin-1-yl)phenyl]-4-(2-phenylethyl)piperazine-1-carboxamide
- PubChem CID: 9845946
- ChemSpider: 8021660

Chemical and physical data
- Formula: C_{25}H_{35}N_{5}O_{2}
- Molar mass: 437.588 g·mol^{−1}
- 3D model (JSmol): Interactive image
- SMILES: CN1CCN(CC1)C2=C(C=CC(=C2)NC(=O)N3CCN(CC3)CCC4=CC=CC=C4)OC
- InChI: InChI=1S/C25H35N5O2/c1-27-12-16-29(17-13-27)23-20-22(8-9-24(23)32-2)26-25(31)30-18-14-28(15-19-30)11-10-21-6-4-3-5-7-21/h3-9,20H,10-19H2,1-2H3,(H,26,31); Key:SDXUUOUVEULXIO-UHFFFAOYSA-N

F-12682 is a serotonin 5-HT_{1B} and 5-HT_{1D} receptor inverse agonist which was under development for the treatment of major depressive disorder but was never marketed. Its route of administration is unknown. The drug was under development by Laboratoires Pierre Fabre in France and was first described in the literature by 1998. It reached the preclinical research or discovery stage of development prior to the discontinuation of its development in 1999.

== See also ==
- List of investigational antidepressants
- F-14258
