= Serenic =

Type of drug that reduces aggression

- Drug class

Class identifiers
- Synonyms: Anti-aggressive drug; Anti-aggressive agent; Anti-aggressive medication; Antiaggressive drug; Antiaggressive agent; Antiaggressive medication
- Use: To reduce aggression and anger

Legal status

A serenic, or anti-aggressive drug, is a type of drug which reduces the capacity for aggression. Known drugs with antiaggressive effects include various serotonergic agents, antidopaminergic drugs like antipsychotics, anticonvulsants and mood stabilizers, beta blockers, nicotine, cannabinoids, oxytocin- and vasopressin-related drugs, and testosterone-suppressing drugs.

== Examples ==
=== Serotonergic agents ===
The recreational drug MDMA ("ecstasy") and a variety of related drugs have been described as empathogen-entactogens, or simply as entactogens. These agents possess serenic and empathy-increasing properties in addition to their euphoriant effects, and have been associated with increased sociability, friendliness, and feelings of closeness to others as well as emotional empathy and prosocial behavior. The entactogenic effects of these drugs are thought to be related to their ability to temporarily increase the levels of certain brain chemicals, including serotonin, dopamine, and, particularly, oxytocin.

Certain other serotonergic drugs, such as 5-HT_{1A} receptor agonists, also increase oxytocin levels and may possess serenic properties as well. The phenylpiperazine mixed 5-HT_{1A} and 5-HT_{1B} receptor agonists eltoprazine, fluprazine, and batoprazine have been described based on animal research as serenics. The selective 5-HT_{1A} biased full agonist F-15,599 (NLX-101) has shown antiaggressive effects in rodents as well.

The serotonin 5-HT_{2C} receptor agonist lorcaserin has been found to reduce impulsive aggression in people with intermittent explosive disorder (IED). Serotonin 5-HT_{2C} receptor agonists have also been found to produce antiaggressive effects in rodents.

The serotonergic psychedelics DOB and DOI, which act as serotonin 5-HT_{2} receptor agonists, show antiaggressive effects in rodents. However, DOI has also been found to have pro-aggressive effects. In older literature, other psychedelics, including LSD, psilocin, dimethyltryptamine (DMT), and mescaline, have been found to reduce aggression in monkeys, but have also been found to increase aggression in animals in other contexts. Serotonin 5-HT_{2A} receptor antagonists have been found to reduce aggression in animals. Atypical antipsychotics, which act in part as serotonin 5-HT_{2A} receptor antagonists, have antiaggressive effects in humans. The selective serotonin reuptake inhibitors (SSRIs) sertraline, fluvoxamine, and fluoxetine inhibited aggression in rodents, whereas the SSRIs citalopram and paroxetine were ineffective.

=== Antidopaminergic agents ===
Antipsychotics, which are dopamine D_{2} receptor antagonists, are well-known as reducing aggression in humans and have been clinically employed for this purpose. Molindone is under development for the treatment of impulsive aggression in children and adolescents with attention deficit hyperactivity disorder (ADHD).

=== Anticonvulsants and mood stabilizers ===
Certain anticonvulsants and mood stabilizers, including valproic acid/divalproex sodium, carbamazepine, oxcarbazepine, phenytoin, lamotrigine, topiramate, and lithium, have been found to be effective in the treatment of aggression. Certain others, including gabapentin and tiagabine, may also have antiaggressive effects. Conversely, levetiracetam has been found to be ineffective. Although anticonvulsants have been found to be effective for treating aggression, it has been reported that many of the same drugs might also produce anger, aggression, and irritability in people with epilepsy.

=== Beta blockers ===
Beta blockers, or β-adrenergic receptor antagonists, have been used to treat aggression and agitation. Beta blockers that have been used for such purposes include propranolol, pindolol, and nadolol.

=== Psychostimulants ===
Psychostimulants like methylphenidate and amphetamines as well as the atypical antipsychotic risperidone are useful in reducing aggression and oppositionality in children and adolescents with attention-deficit hyperactivity disorder (ADHD), antisocial personality disorder, and autism spectrum disorder with moderate to large effect sizes and greater effectiveness than other studied medications. Another meta-analysis found that methylphenidate slightly reduced irritability while amphetamines increased the risk of irritability several-fold in children with ADHD however. Other research has found no impact of amphetamine or methamphetamine on aggression in humans.

=== Cholinergic agents ===
Nicotinic acetylcholine receptors within the CNS, specifically α_{7} homopentameric receptors, are implicated in the regulation of aggression. The serenic effect of nicotine is well documented both in laboratory animals and humans, and, conversely, nicotinic receptor antagonists and nicotine withdrawal are associated with irritability and aggression. Additionally, nicotinic receptors are required for rabies virus entry into a neuron, and the dysfunction of these neurons is implicated in the rabies-associated aggression.

=== Cannabinoids ===
Cannabinoids like nabilone have been studied and reported effective for management of severe aggression in people with profound autism and other intellectual and developmental disabilities.

=== Hormonal and related agents ===
Agonists and antagonists of the receptors for the endogenous hormones oxytocin and vasopressin, respectively, have been shown to decrease aggressive behavior in scientific research, implicating them in the normal regulation of pathways involving aggressive behavior in the brain. The small-molecule indirect oxytocin-like drugs KNX-100 (SOC-1) and KNX-101, which have since been found to act as 15-lipoxygenase (15-LOX; ALOX15) inhibitors, have been found to produce antiaggressive effects in animals. Certain neurosteroids, such as allopregnanolone, also appear to play a role in the regulation of aggression, including, notably, sexually-dimorphic aggressive behavior. The sex hormones testosterone and estradiol regulate aggression as well.

== See also ==
- Anger § Medication therapy
- List of investigational aggression drugs
- List of investigational agitation drugs
