= Agitation (dementia) =

Distress in patients with dementia

Agitation in predementia and dementia is distressed affect that leads to poor moods and often aggression toward other people, such as family members and other caregivers. Agitation is often part of dementia and often precedes the diagnosis of common age-related disorders of cognition such as Alzheimer's disease (AD). More than 80% of people who develop AD eventually become agitated or aggressive. Agitation in dementia overlaps with psychomotor agitation but is not always equal to it, depending on whose definition is used. Although some authorities consider them synonymous, psychomotor agitation by definition ("-motor") involves maladaptive movements, whereas agitation in predementia and dementia often involves distress, fear, and aggression even when repetitive purposeless movements (such as pacing) are absent. The synonymy viewpoint views the whole topic as a single spectrum in which repetitive purposeless movements may arise or not, or recede, at various times.

== Evaluation ==
It is important to rule out infection and other environmental causes of agitation, such as disease or other bodily discomfort, before initiating any intervention. If no such explanation is found, it is important to support caregivers and educate them about simple strategies such as distraction that may delay the transfer to institutional care (which is often triggered by the onset of agitation).

== Treatment ==
On May 11, 2023, the FDA approved brexpiprazole (brand name – Rexulti) as a prescription medication for treatment of agitation in dementia.

Medical treatment may begin with a cholinesterase inhibitor, which appears safer than other alternatives although evidence for its efficacy is mixed. If this does not improve the symptoms, atypical antipsychotics may offer an alternative, although they are effective against agitation only in the short-term while posing a well-documented risk of cerebrovascular events (e.g. stroke). Other possible interventions, such as traditional antipsychotics or antidepressants, are less well studied for this condition.
