= GR-127935 =

Drug

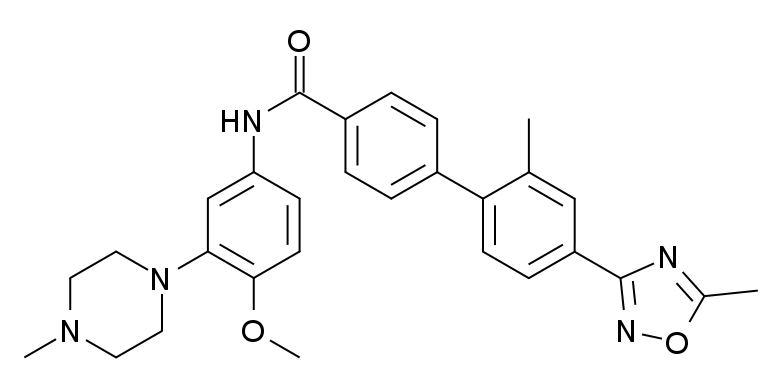

Clinical data
- ATC code: none

Identifiers
- IUPAC name: N-[4-methoxy-3-(4-methyl-1-piperazinyl)phenyl]-2'-methyl-4'-(5-methyl-1,2,4-oxadiazol-3-yl)-1-1'-biphenyl-4-carboxamide
- CAS Number: 148672-13-3
- PubChem CID: 107780
- IUPHAR/BPS: 14
- ChemSpider: 96935
- UNII: 2LLH6CEB40
- ChEBI: CHEBI:64114
- ChEMBL: ChEMBL15928
- CompTox Dashboard (EPA): DTXSID90164044

Chemical and physical data
- Formula: C_{29}H_{31}N_{5}O_{3}
- Molar mass: 497.599 g·mol^{−1}
- 3D model (JSmol): Interactive image
- SMILES: n5oc(C)nc5-c(cc2C)ccc2-c(cc3)ccc3C(=O)Nc(ccc1OC)cc1N4CCN(C)CC4
- InChI: InChI=1S/C29H31N5O3/c1-19-17-23(28-30-20(2)37-32-28)9-11-25(19)21-5-7-22(8-6-21)29(35)31-24-10-12-27(36-4)26(18-24)34-15-13-33(3)14-16-34/h5-12,17-18H,13-16H2,1-4H3,(H,31,35); Key:YDBCEBYHYKAFRX-UHFFFAOYSA-N

GR-127935 is a drug which acts as a selective antagonist at the serotonin receptors 5-HT_{1B} and 5-HT_{1D}. It has little effect when given by itself but blocks the antiaggressive effect of 5-HT_{1B} agonists, and alters release of serotonin in the brain, as well as reducing drug-seeking behaviour in cocaine addicted rats.

== See also ==
- Elzasonan
