= Psychomotor agitation =

Medical condition characterized by unintentional and purposeless motions and restlessness

- Other names: Pacing
- Specialty: Psychiatry, emergency medicine

Psychomotor agitation is a symptom in various disorders and health conditions. It is characterized by unintentional and purposeless motions and restlessness, often but not always accompanied by emotional distress. Typical manifestations include pacing around, wringing of the hands, uncontrolled tongue movement, pulling off clothing and putting it back on, and other similar actions. In more severe cases, the motions may become harmful to the individual, and may involve things such as ripping, tearing, or chewing at the skin around one's fingernails, lips, or other body parts to the point of bleeding. Psychomotor agitation is typically found in various mental disorders, especially in psychotic and mood disorders. It can be a result of drug intoxication or withdrawal. It can also be caused by severe hyponatremia. People with existing psychiatric disorders and men under the age of 40 are at a higher risk of developing psychomotor agitation.

Psychomotor agitation overlaps with agitation generally, such as agitation in predementia and dementia; see Agitation (dementia) for details.

== Signs and symptoms ==
People experiencing psychomotor agitation may feel the following emotions or do the following actions. Some of these actions are not inherently harmful, but may be evaluated as psychomotor agitation as these symptoms may escalate and become dangerous.

- unable to sit still
- fidgeting
- body stiffness
- unable to relieve tension
- desperate to find a comfortable position
- increasingly anxious
- exasperated
- tearful
- extreme irritability, like snapping at friends and family, or being annoyed by small things
- anger
- agitation
- racing thoughts and incessant talking
- restlessness
- pacing
- hand-wringing
- self-hugging
- nail-biting
- outbursts of complaining or shouting
- pulling at clothes or hair
- picking at skin, as either a sign of PMA or even progressing to a disorder (excoriation disorder)
- tapping fingers
- tapping feet
- starting and stopping tasks abruptly
- talking very quickly
- moving objects around for no reason
- taking off clothes then putting them back on

== Causes ==
Causes include:

- Schizophrenia
- Bipolar disorder
- Post-traumatic stress disorder (PTSD)
- Panic attacks
- Anxiety disorder
- Obsessive–compulsive disorder (OCD)
- Nicotine withdrawal
- Alcohol withdrawal
- Opioid withdrawal
- Autism
- Claustrophobia
- Intellectual disability
- Attention deficit hyperactivity disorder (ADHD)
- Dementia
- Parkinson's disease
- Traumatic brain injury
- Alzheimer's disease
- Acute intermittent porphyria
- Hereditary coproporphyria
- Variegate porphyria
- Side effects of stimulants such as cocaine or methylphenidate
- Side effects of antipsychotics like haloperidol
- SSRI or SNRI medications

As explained in a 2008 study, in people with mood disorders there is a dynamic link between their mood and the way they move.

People showing signs of psychomotor agitation may be experiencing mental tension and anxiety, which comes out physically as:

- fast or repetitive movements
- movements that have no purpose
- movements that are not intentional

These activities are the subconscious mind's way of trying to relieve tension. Often people experiencing psychomotor agitation feel as if their movements are not deliberate.

Sometimes, however, psychomotor agitation does not relate to mental tension and anxiety.

Recent studies found that nicotine withdrawal induces psychomotor agitation (motor deficit).

In other cases, psychomotor agitation can be caused by antipsychotic medications. For instance, akathisia, a movement disorder sometimes induced by antipsychotics and other psychotropics, is estimated to affect 15-35% of patients with schizophrenia.

== Treatment ==
A form of self-treatment arises in that many patients develop stimming in a natural, unplanned, and largely nonconscious way, simply because they coincidentally discover behavior that brings some relief to their psychomotor agitation, and develop habits around it. Stimming has many forms, some quite adaptive and others maladaptive (for example, excessive hand-wringing can injure joints, and excessive rubbing or scratching of skin can injure it). Another form of self-treatment that arises not uncommonly is self-medication, which can lead to substance use disorders such as alcohol use disorder.

Whereas stimming is a nonpharmacologic but undirected and sometimes harmful amelioration, directed therapy tries to introduce another and generally better nonpharmacologic help in the form of the following lifestyle changes, to help a person to reduce their anxiety levels:

- regular exercise
- yoga and meditation
- deep breathing exercises

Because nonpharmacologic treatment by itself is often not enough, medications are also often used. Intramuscular midazolam, lorazepam, or another benzodiazepine can be used both to sedate agitated patients and to control semi-involuntary muscle movements in cases of suspected akathisia.

Droperidol, haloperidol, or other typical antipsychotics can decrease the duration of agitation caused by acute psychosis, but should be avoided if the agitation is suspected to be akathisia, which can be potentially worsened. Also using promethazine may be useful. Recently, four atypical antipsychotics, olanzapine, risperidone, aripiprazole and ziprasidone, have become available and FDA approved as an instant release intramuscular injection formulations to control acute agitation. The IM formulations of these three atypical antipsychotics are considered to be at least as effective or even more effective than the IM administration of haloperidol alone or haloperidol with lorazepam (which is the standard treatment of agitation in most hospitals) and the atypicals have a dramatically improved tolerability due to a milder side-effect profile.

In those with psychosis causing agitation, there is a lack of support for the use of benzodiazepines alone, however they are commonly used in combination with antipsychotics since they can prevent side effects associated with dopamine antagonists.

== See also ==
- Agitation (dementia)
- Akathisia
- Body-focused repetitive behavior
- Excited delirium
- List of investigational agitation drugs
