= 5-HT1D receptor =

Serotonin receptor which affects locomotion and anxiety in humans

HTR1D

Identifiers
- Aliases: HTR1D, 5-HT1D, HT1DA, HTR1DA, HTRL, RDC4, 5-HT1D receptor, 5-hydroxytryptamine receptor 1D
- External IDs: OMIM: 182133; MGI: 96276; GeneCards: HTR1D

Gene location (Human)
Chr.	Chromosome 1 (human)
Band	1p36.12	Start	23,191,895 bp
Band	1p36.12	End	23,217,502 bp

Gene location (Mouse)
Chr.	Chromosome 4 (mouse)
Band	4 D3|4 68.74 cM	Start	136,150,835 bp
Band	4 D3|4 68.74 cM	End	136,171,709 bp
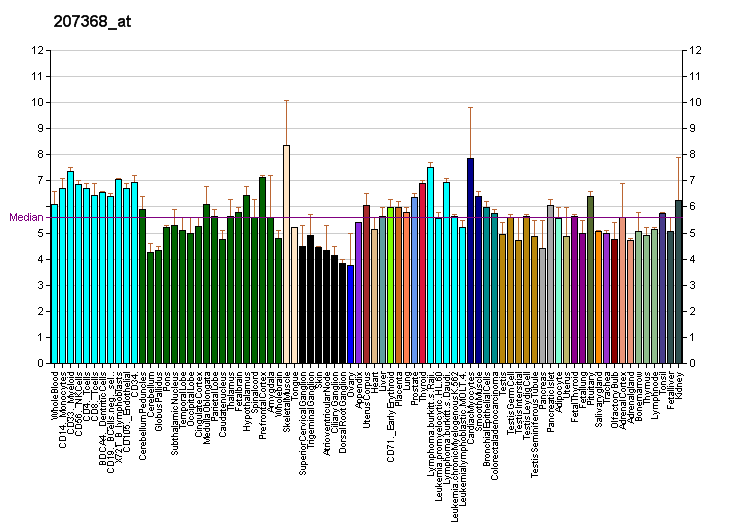
RNA expression pattern
Bgee	Human / Mouse (ortholog); Top expressed in: testicle; nucleus accumbens; putamen; duodenum; caudate nucleus; gallbladder; gonad; ganglionic eminence; stromal cell of endometrium; prefrontal cortex / Top expressed in: paraventricular nucleus of thalamus; lumbar spinal ganglion; lateral habenular nucleus; ventral nuclear group; lateral preoptic nucleus; multiform layer of neocortex; medial habenular nucleus; ventral nucleus of lateral geniculate body; embryo; nucleus of lateral olfactory tract; More reference expression data
BioGPS	More reference expression data
Gene ontology
Molecular function	G protein-coupled receptor activity; signal transducer activity; G protein-coupled serotonin receptor activity; neurotransmitter receptor activity; serotonin binding
Cellular component	integral component of membrane; plasma membrane; integral component of plasma membrane; membrane; dendrite
Biological process	intestine smooth muscle contraction; regulation of locomotion; smooth muscle contraction; G protein-coupled receptor signaling pathway, coupled to cyclic nucleotide second messenger; regulation of behavior; adenylate cyclase-inhibiting G protein-coupled receptor signaling pathway; response to toxic substance; vasoconstriction; signal transduction; chemical synaptic transmission; G protein-coupled serotonin receptor signaling pathway; G protein-coupled receptor signaling pathway
Sources:Amigo / QuickGO
Orthologs
Databases	NCBI: entry; OMA: entry
Species	Human	Mouse
Entrez	3352	15552
Ensembl	ENSG00000179546	ENSMUSG00000070687
UniProt	P28221	Q61224
RefSeq (mRNA)	NM_000864	NM_001285482; NM_001285483; NM_001285484; NM_008309
RefSeq (protein)	NP_000855	NP_001272411; NP_001272412; NP_001272413; NP_032335
Location (UCSC)	Chr 1: 23.19 – 23.22 Mb	Chr 4: 136.15 – 136.17 Mb
PubMed search
- Wikidata
View/Edit Human	View/Edit Mouse

5-hydroxytryptamine (serotonin) receptor 1D, also known as HTR1D, is a 5-HT receptor, but also denotes the human gene encoding it. 5-HT_{1D} acts on the central nervous system, and affects locomotion and anxiety. It also induces vasoconstriction in the brain.

== Tissue distribution ==
5HT_{1D} receptors are found at low levels in the basal ganglia (globus pallidus, substantia nigra, caudate putamen), the hippocampus, and in the cortex.

== Structure ==
5HT_{1D} receptor is a G protein-coupled receptor that activates an intracellular messenger cascade to produce an inhibitory response by decreasing cellular levels of cAMP. A large intercellular loop between TM-5 and TM-6 is believed to be associated with coupling to a second messenger. Agonists might bind in a manner that utilizes an aspartate residue in TM-3 and residues in the TM-4, TM-5 and TM-6. A human clone containing an intronless open reading frame was found to encode 377 amino acids of the 5HT_{1D} receptor. The gene has been localized on chromosome 1, region 1p34.3-36.3

== Ligands ==
=== Agonists ===
Molecular modelling has provided a picture of the agonistic binding site of 5HT_{1D}. The amino acid residues within the receptor binding site region have been identified. This is a valuable guide to design potential 5HT_{1D} receptor agonists. When sumatriptan binds there is major conformational change in both ligand and receptor in the binding pocket.

- 5-(Nonyloxy)tryptamine
- Sumatriptan (vasoconstrictor in migraine)
- Ergotamine (vasoconstrictor in migraine)
- Zolmitriptan
- 5-Carboxamidotryptamine (5-CT)
- 5-(t-Butyl)-N-methyltryptamine
- CP-135807
- CP-286601
- PNU-109291 ((S)-3,4-Dihydro-1-[2-[4-(4-methoxyphenyl)-1-piperazinyl]ethyl]-N-methyl-1H-2-benzopyran-6-carboxamide)
- PNU-142633 ((1S)-1-[2-[4-[4-(Aminocarbonyl)phenyl]-1-piperazinyl]ethyl]-3,4-dihydro-N-methyl-1H-2-benzopyran-6-carboxamide)
- GR-46611 (3-[3-(2-Dimethylaminoethyl)-1H-indol-5-yl]-N-(4-methoxybenzyl)acrylamide)
- L-694247 (2-[5-[3-(4-Methylsulfonylamino)benzyl-1,2,4-oxadiazol-5-yl]-1H-indol-3-yl]ethanamine)
- L-760790
- L-772405
- PGI-7043

=== Antagonists ===
- Ziprasidone (atypical antipsychotic)
- Methiothepin (antipsychotic)
- Yohimbine (aphrodisiac)
- Metergoline
- BRL-15572
- Vortioxetine (antidepressant)
- F-12682
- F-14258
- GR-127935 (mixed 5-HT_{1B/1D} antagonist)
- SB-714786
- LY-310762
- LY-367642
- LY-456219
- LY-456220

=== Negative allosteric modulators ===
- 5-HT-moduline

== See also ==
- 5-HT_{1} receptor
- 5-HT receptor
