= C14H16N2 =

The molecular formula C_{14}H_{16}N_{2} (molar mass: 212.29 g/mol) may refer to:

- Atipamezole
- Diphenylethylenediamine
- Ergoline
- Napactadine
- Naphthylpiperazines
  - 1-(1-Naphthyl)piperazine
  - 1-(2-Naphthyl)piperazine
- RS134-49
- Tolidine
- Z8779877149
- MTHPI
