= BRL-54443 =

Chemical compound

Identifiers
- IUPAC name: 3-(1-methylpiperidin-4-yl)-1H-indol-5-ol
- CAS Number: 57477-39-1
- PubChem CID: 2438
- IUPHAR/BPS: 3927
- ChemSpider: 2344
- UNII: Q2DH1CHI0Y
- CompTox Dashboard (EPA): DTXSID40206089

Chemical and physical data
- Formula: C_{14}H_{18}N_{2}O
- Molar mass: 230.311 g·mol^{−1}
- 3D model (JSmol): Interactive image
- SMILES: Oc3ccc1c(c(c[nH]1)C2CCN(C)CC2)c3
- InChI: InChI=1S/C14H18N2O/c1-16-6-4-10(5-7-16)13-9-15-14-3-2-11(17)8-12(13)14/h2-3,8-10,15,17H,4-7H2,1H3; Key:WKNFADCGOAHBPG-UHFFFAOYSA-N

BRL-54443 is a drug of the piperidinylindole family which acts as a selective agonist for the 5-HT_{1E} and 5-HT_{1F} serotonin receptor subtypes.

== See also ==
- Piperidinylindole
- Substituted tryptamine § Related compounds
- CP-94253
- RS134-49
- RU-24969
- Sertindole
- SN-22
- VU6067416
