= 1-(1-Naphthyl)piperazine =

Chemical compound

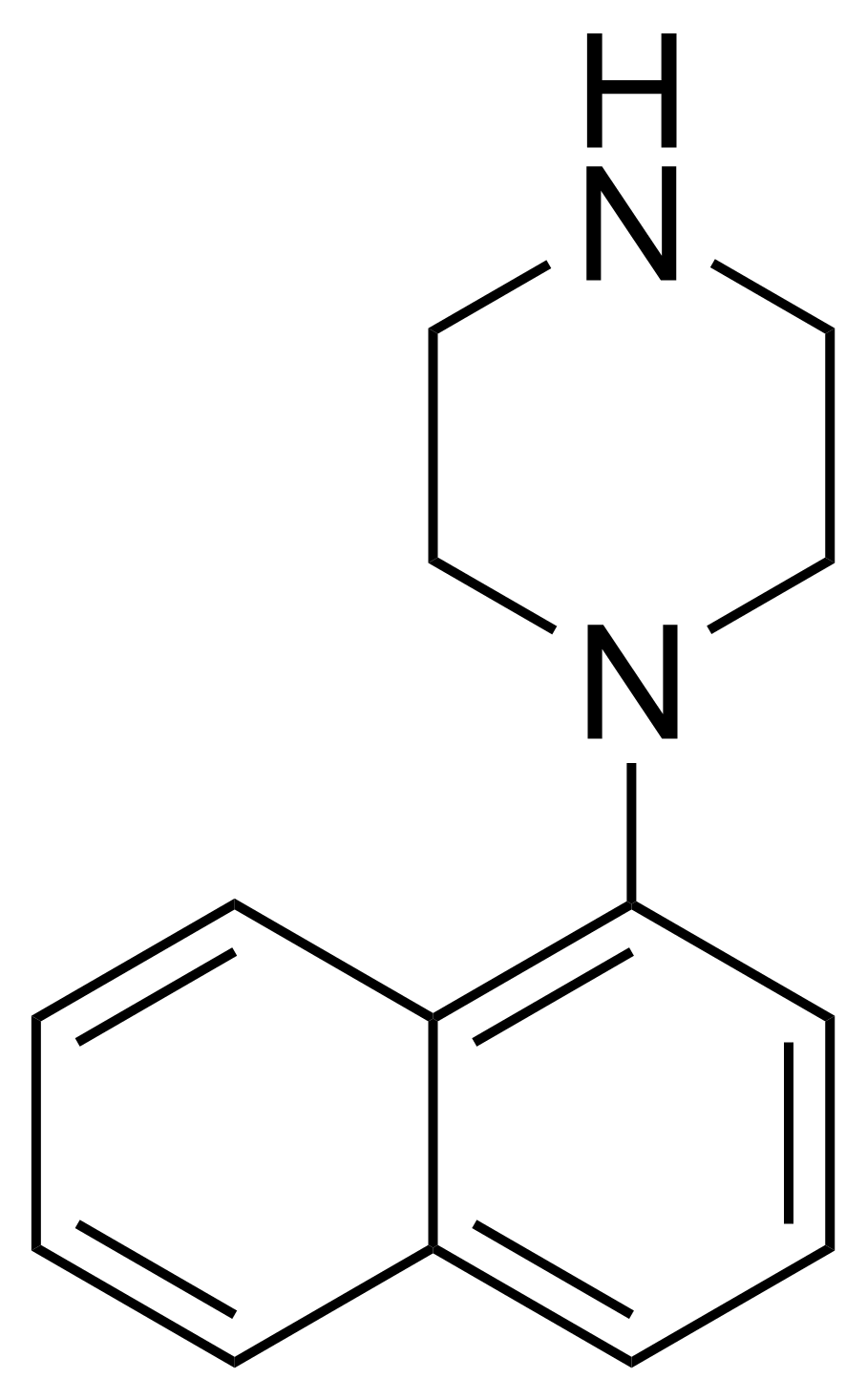

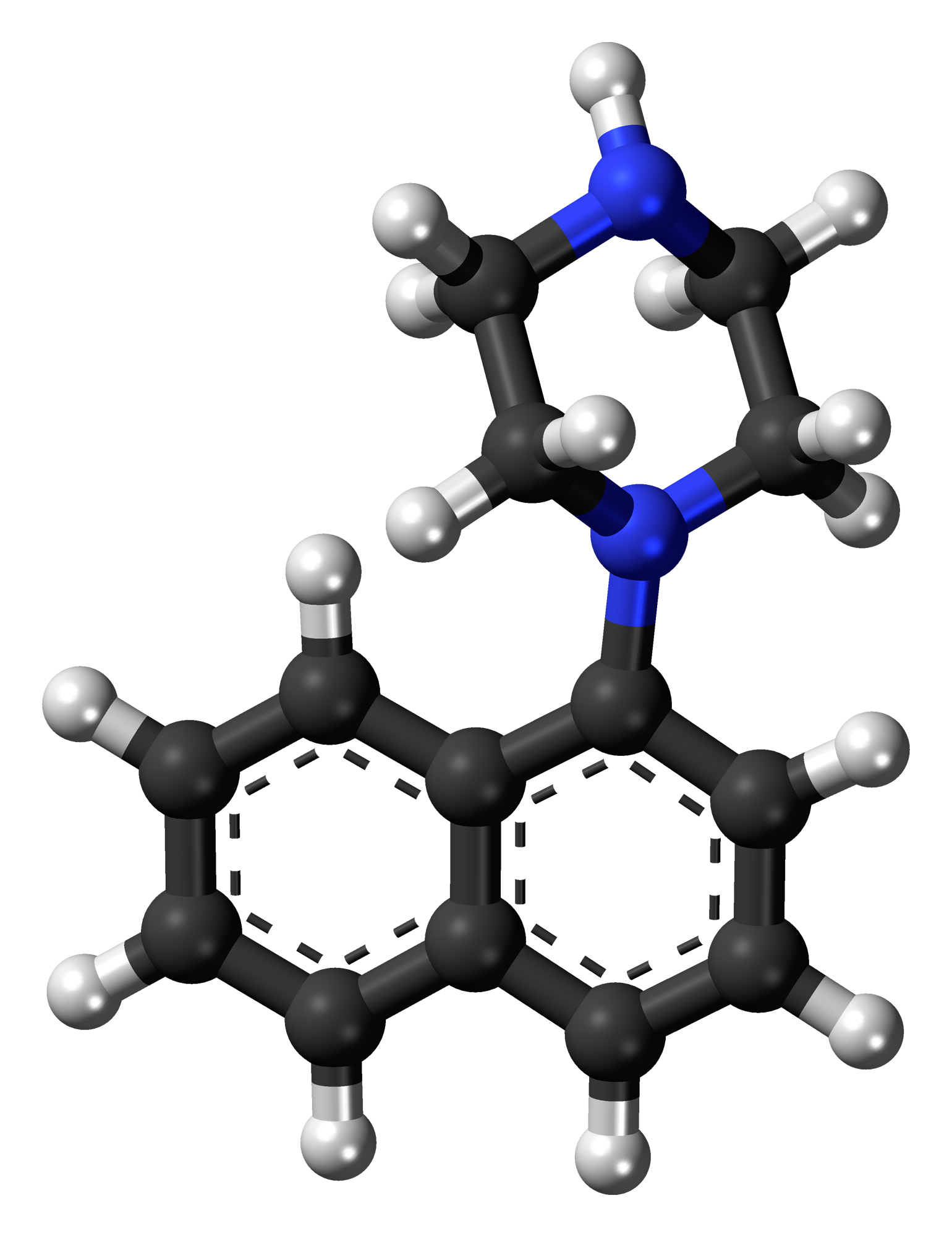

Clinical data
- Routes of administration: Oral
- ATC code: none

Legal status
- Legal status: In general: uncontrolled

Identifiers
- IUPAC name: 1-(naphthalen-1-yl)piperazine
- CAS Number: 57536-86-4
- PubChem CID: 1342
- IUPHAR/BPS: 3
- ChemSpider: 1302
- UNII: FJ7MR37A24
- CompTox Dashboard (EPA): DTXSID30973071

Chemical and physical data
- Formula: C_{14}H_{16}N_{2}
- Molar mass: 212.296 g·mol^{−1}
- 3D model (JSmol): Interactive image
- SMILES: c2cc(c1ccccc1c2)N3CCNCC3

1-(1-Naphthyl)piperazine (1-NP) is a drug which is a phenylpiperazine derivative.

It acts as a non-selective, mixed serotonergic agent, exerting partial agonism at the 5-HT_{1A}, 5-HT_{1B}, 5-HT_{1D}, 5-HT_{1E}, and 5-HT_{1F} receptors, while antagonizing the 5-HT_{2A}, 5-HT_{2B}, and 5-HT_{2C} receptors. It has also been shown to possess high affinity for the 5-HT_{3}, 5-HT_{5A}, 5-HT_{6}, and 5-HT_{7} receptors, and may bind to 5-HT_{4} and the SERT as well.

In animals it produces effects including hyperphagia, hyperactivity, and anxiolysis, of which are all likely mediated predominantly or fully by blockade of the 5-HT_{2C} receptor.

Derivatives of naphthylpiperazine include CSP-2503, F-11,461, S-14506, and S-14671.

== See also ==
- 1-(2-Naphthyl)piperazine (2-NP)
- Substituted piperazine
- Diphenylpiperazine
- Phenylpiperazine
- Quipazine
