= Piperidinylindole =

Group of chemical compounds

Piperidinylindoles are a group of chemical compounds related to the tryptamines. Examples of these compounds include the simple piperidinylindoles SN-22 and BRL-54443, the triptans naratriptan and LY-334370, and the more structurally complex antipsychotic sertindole. The piperidinylindoles are similar to cyclized tryptamines like the tetrahydropyridinylindoles RS134-49 and RU-28253, but are not technically tryptamines themselves. Piperidinylindoles are known to act as serotonin receptor modulators.

Chemical structures of selected piperidinylindoles
SN-22

BRL-54443

Naratriptan

LY-334370

Sertindole

== See also ==
- Substituted tryptamine § Related compounds
- Cyclized tryptamine
- Tetrahydropyridinylindole
