= C14H16N2O =

The molecular formula C_{14}H_{16}N_{2}O (molar mass: 228.29 g/mol, exact mass: 228.1263 u) may refer to:

- PHA-57378
- RU-24,969
- RU-28253
