= CSP-2503 =

Chemical compound

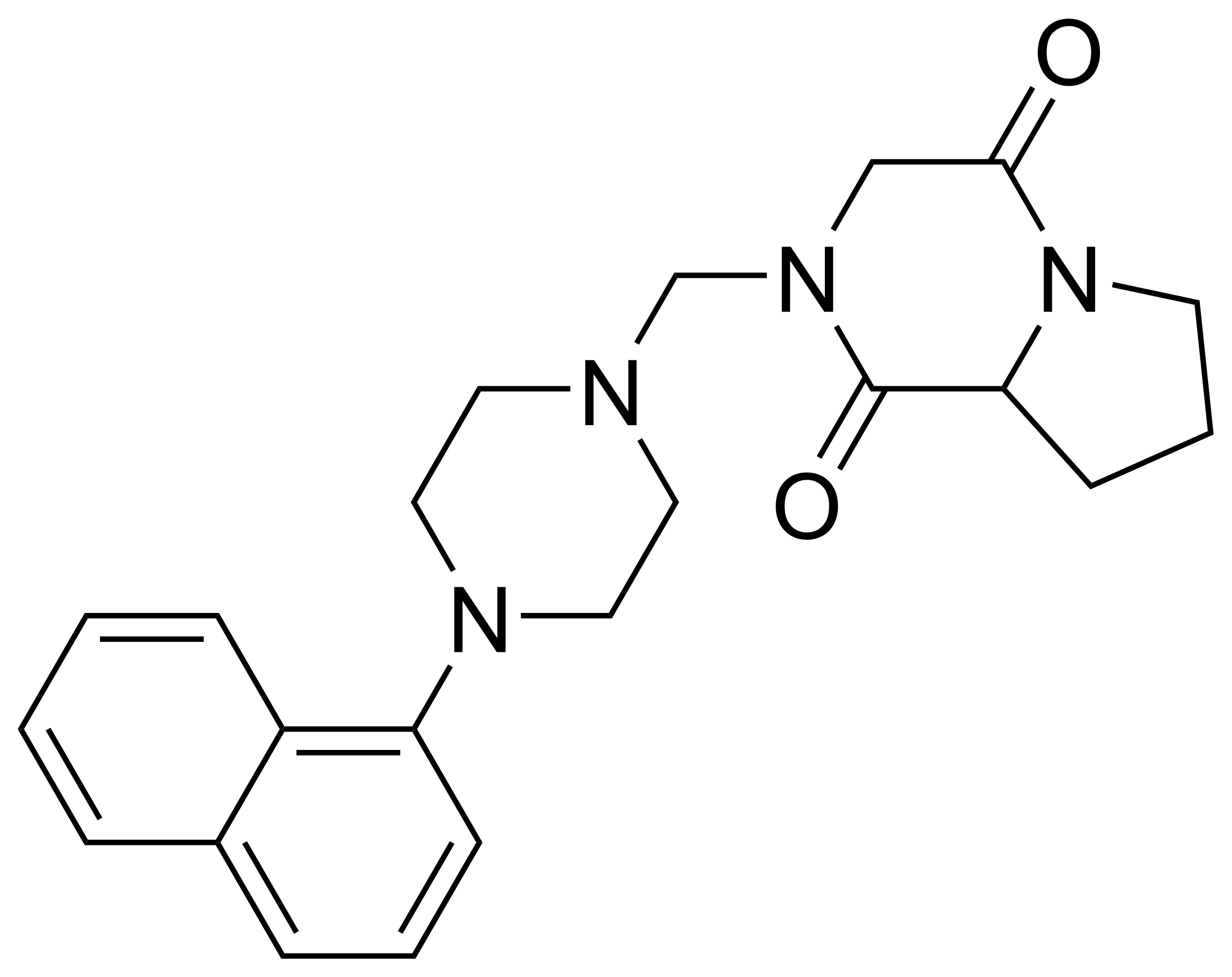

Clinical data
- ATC code: none

Identifiers
- IUPAC name: 2-[(4-naphthalen-1-ylpiperazin-1-yl)methyl]hexahydropyrrolo[1,2-a]pyrazine-1,4-dione
- CAS Number: 581813-10-7
- PubChem CID: 10317515
- ChemSpider: 8492979
- UNII: 87UKL3XE5X
- ChEMBL: ChEMBL285066

Chemical and physical data
- Formula: C_{22}H_{26}N_{4}O_{2}
- Molar mass: 378.476 g·mol^{−1}
- 3D model (JSmol): Interactive image
- SMILES: O=C4N5CCCC5C(=O)N(CN3CCN(c2c1ccccc1ccc2)CC3)C4
- InChI: InChI=1S/C22H26N4O2/c27-21-15-25(22(28)20-9-4-10-26(20)21)16-23-11-13-24(14-12-23)19-8-3-6-17-5-1-2-7-18(17)19/h1-3,5-8,20H,4,9-16H2; Key:CTZWGZSINBFHFD-UHFFFAOYSA-N

CSP-2503 is a potent and selective 5-HT_{1A} receptor agonist, 5-HT_{2A} receptor antagonist, and 5-HT_{3} receptor antagonist of the naphthylpiperazine class. First synthesized in 2003, it was designed based on computational models and QSAR studies. In rat studies, CSP-2503 has demonstrated anxiolytic effects, and thus has been suggested as a treatment for anxiety in humans with a multimodal mechanism of action.

== See also ==
- Naphthylpiperazine
- S-14,671
- S-14,506
