= SN-22 =

Chemical compound

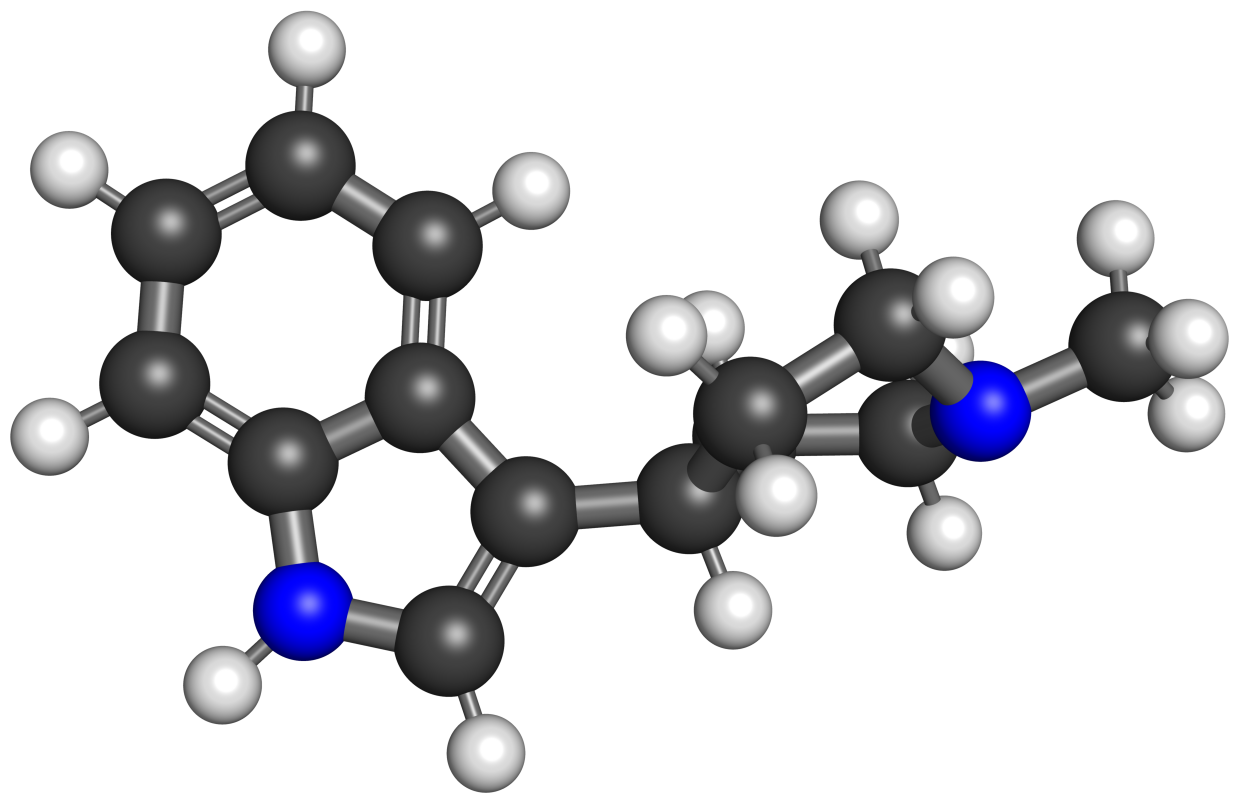

Clinical data
- Other names: 3-(1-Methyl-4-piperidinyl)indole
- Drug class: Serotonin receptor modulator

Identifiers
- IUPAC name: 3-(1-methylpiperidin-4-yl)-1H-indole
- CAS Number: 17403-07-5
- PubChem CID: 11206672
- ChemSpider: 9381734
- UNII: 7NSM99C49F
- ChEMBL: ChEMBL341485
- CompTox Dashboard (EPA): DTXSID90169751

Chemical and physical data
- Formula: C_{14}H_{18}N_{2}
- Molar mass: 214.312 g·mol^{−1}
- 3D model (JSmol): Interactive image
- SMILES: CN1CCC(CC1)C2=CNC3=CC=CC=C32
- InChI: InChI=1S/C14H18N2/c1-16-8-6-11(7-9-16)13-10-15-14-5-3-2-4-12(13)14/h2-5,10-11,15H,6-9H2,1H3; Key:KYSCKYJNMTUJPA-UHFFFAOYSA-N

SN-22, also known as 3-(1-methyl-4-piperidinyl)indole, is a serotonin receptor modulator of the piperidinylindole group related to the psychedelic drug dimethyltryptamine (DMT). Though it is not technically a tryptamine itself, SN-22 can be regarded as a constrained analogue of DMT.

The drug shows affinity for the serotonin 5-HT_{1A} and 5-HT_{2A} receptors (K_{i} = 146–514 nM and 19–67 nM, respectively). A deuterated isotopologue of SN-22 is known to be a serotonin 5-HT_{2A} receptor agonist, albeit with lower potency than DMT.

The chemical synthesis of SN-22 has been described. Analogues of SN-22 include MTHPI, RU-24969 (5-MeO-THPI), RU-28253, and MPMI, among others. Derivatives include BRL-54443 (5-hydroxy-SN-22), LY-334370, naratriptan, and sertindole. Many other derivatives of SN-22 are also known, most of which are ligands for serotonin 5-HT_{1A}, 5-HT_{2A}, or 5-HT_{6} receptors, dopamine D_{2} receptors, or the serotonin transporter (SERT). Deuterated derivatives of SN-22 have been described as well. SN-22, along with MTHPI, shows some resemblance to MPTP in terms of chemical structure.

SN-22 was first described in the scientific literature by Ethan Will Taylor and colleagues by 1988.

== See also ==
- Piperidinylindole
- Cyclized tryptamine
- Substituted tryptamine § Related compounds
