= LY-334370 =

Chemical compound

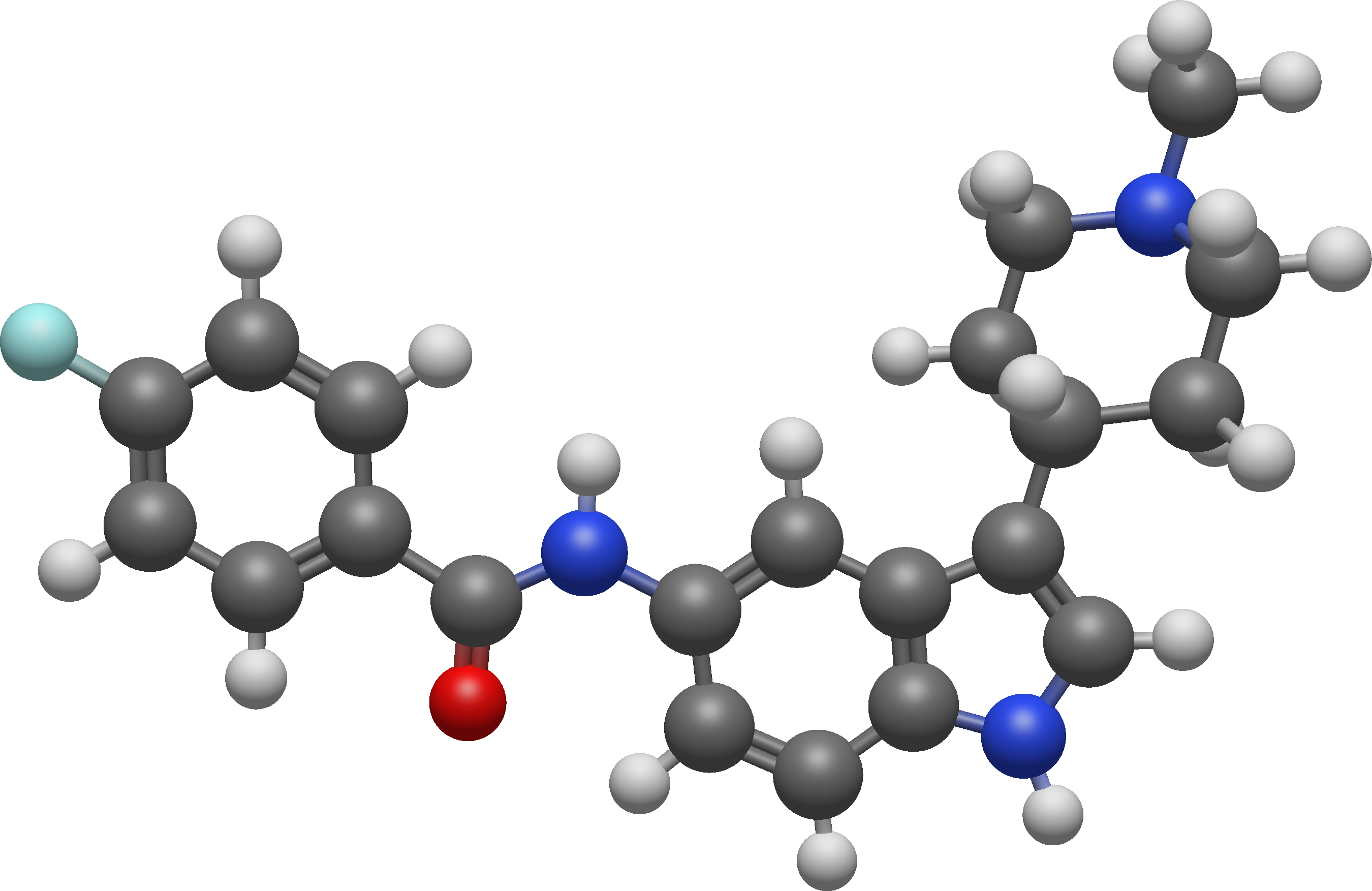

Clinical data
- Other names: LY334370; LY-334,370
- Drug class: Serotonin 5-HT_{1F} receptor agonist
- ATC code: None

Identifiers
- IUPAC name: 4-fluoro-N-[3-(1-methylpiperidin-4-yl)-1H-indol-5-yl]benzamide
- CAS Number: 182563-08-2
- PubChem CID: 5311258
- IUPHAR/BPS: 20; 151
- ChemSpider: 4470773
- UNII: 5Q7I1WL2UY
- ChEMBL: ChEMBL101690
- CompTox Dashboard (EPA): DTXSID40415518

Chemical and physical data
- Formula: C_{21}H_{22}FN_{3}O
- Molar mass: 351.425 g·mol^{−1}
- 3D model (JSmol): Interactive image
- SMILES: CN1CCC(CC1)C2=CNC3=C2C=C(C=C3)NC(=O)C4=CC=C(C=C4)F
- InChI: InChI=1S/C21H22FN3O/c1-25-10-8-14(9-11-25)19-13-23-20-7-6-17(12-18(19)20)24-21(26)15-2-4-16(22)5-3-15/h2-7,12-14,23H,8-11H2,1H3,(H,24,26); Key:MDMJLMDBRQXOOI-UHFFFAOYSA-N

LY-334370 is a selective serotonin 5-HT_{1F} receptor agonist of the triptan and piperidinylindole families which was under development by Eli Lilly and Company for the treatment of migraine headaches. The drug showed efficacy in a phase II clinical trial but further development was halted due to toxicity detected in animals. It is closely related to tryptamines like the psychedelic drug dimethyltryptamine (DMT), but is not technically a tryptamine itself and is instead a piperidinylindole similarly to naratriptan. The drug's affinities for various serotonin receptors have been reported.

== See also ==
- Triptan
- Piperidinylindole
- Substituted tryptamine § Related compounds
- CP-135807
- Lasmiditan
- SN-22
