= Tepirindole =

Abandoned antipsychotic drug

Clinical data
- Other names: RU-27592; HR-592; 5-Chloro-N′-propyl-THPI
- Drug class: Atypical antipsychotic; Major tranquilizer
- ATC code: None

Identifiers
- IUPAC name: 5-chloro-3-(1-propyl-3,6-dihydro-2H-pyridin-4-yl)-1H-indole
- CAS Number: 72808-81-2
- PubChem CID: 68915
- ChemSpider: 62142
- UNII: X235XX30GK
- ChEMBL: ChEMBL2105413
- CompTox Dashboard (EPA): DTXSID30868175

Chemical and physical data
- Formula: C_{16}H_{19}ClN_{2}
- Molar mass: 274.79 g·mol^{−1}
- 3D model (JSmol): Interactive image
- SMILES: CCCN1CCC(=CC1)C2=CNC3=C2C=C(C=C3)Cl
- InChI: InChI=1S/C16H19ClN2/c1-2-7-19-8-5-12(6-9-19)15-11-18-16-4-3-13(17)10-14(15)16/h3-5,10-11,18H,2,6-9H2,1H3; Key:ZRCUMOBNOPSLKM-UHFFFAOYSA-N

Tepirindole (INN; developmental code names RU-27592, HR-592) is a tryptamine-related atypical antipsychotic and major tranquilizer which was never marketed. It is similar in structure to tryptamines but is not technically a tryptamine itself and is instead a tetrahydropyridinylindole. The drug is said to act on dopamine D_{2}, serotonin 5-HT_{2}, and α_{1}-adrenergic receptors. It is a potent dopamine receptor antagonist but reportedly has little propensity to cause catalepsy and has been said to potentially be useful in treating the negative symptoms of schizophrenia. The drug may also act as a potent serotonin receptor agonist. Tepirindole was first described in the literature by 1979.

== See also ==
- Tetrahydropyridinylindole
- Cyclized tryptamine
- Ciclindole
- Flucindole
- Sertindole
