= 5-HT1D receptor agonist =

5-HT_{1D} receptor agonists are pharmaceutical drugs for the treatment of migraine. They include:

- Triptans (which additionally act as 5-HT_{1B} receptor agonists)
- Ergotamine (which also has other mechanisms of action)
- Dihydroergotamine, a derivative of the former
- Alniditan
