= Quipazine =

Chemical compound

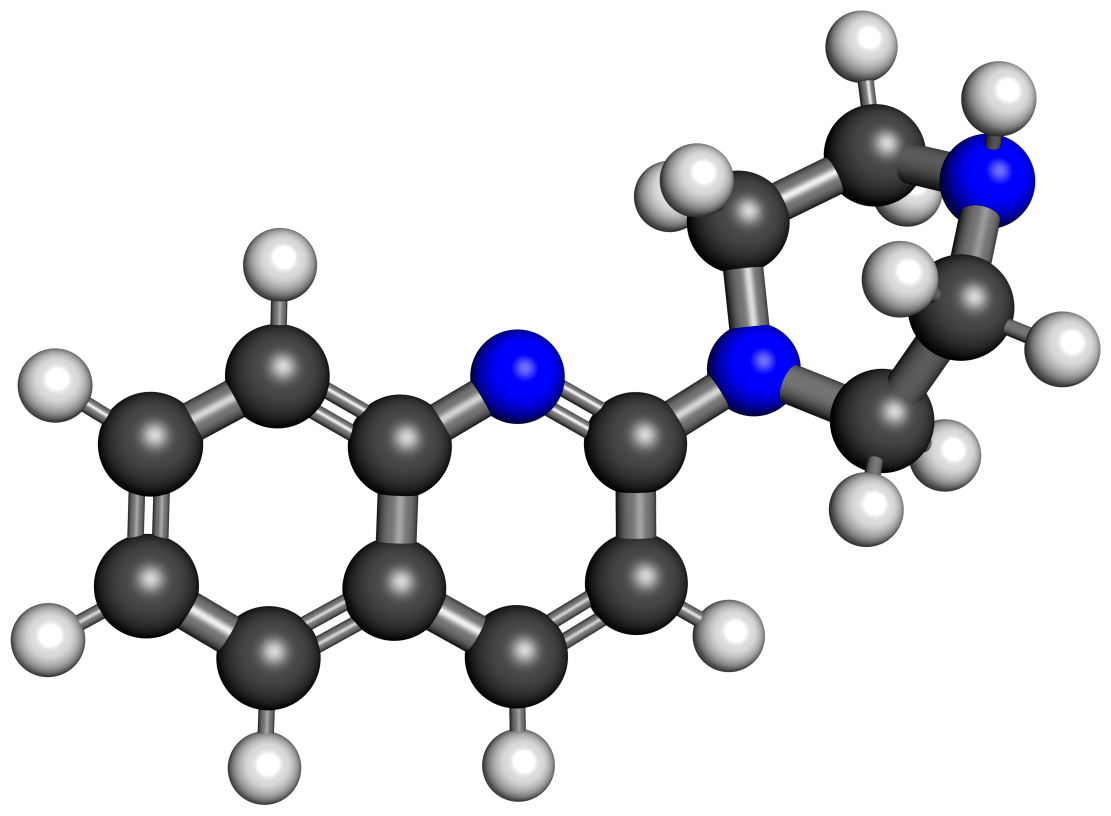

Clinical data
- Other names: 2-(1-Piperazinyl)quinoline; 2-Piperazinoquinoline; 1-(2-Quinolinyl)piperazine; 2-QP
- Routes of administration: Oral
- Drug class: Non-selective serotonin receptor agonist; Serotonin reuptake inhibitor; Emetic; Serotonergic psychedelic; Hallucinogen
- ATC code: None

Identifiers
- IUPAC name: 2-piperazin-1-ylquinoline
- CAS Number: 4774-24-7
- PubChem CID: 5011
- IUPHAR/BPS: 173
- ChemSpider: 4836
- UNII: 4WCY05C0SJ
- ChEMBL: ChEMBL18772
- CompTox Dashboard (EPA): DTXSID3046952
- ECHA InfoCard: 100.164.885

Chemical and physical data
- Formula: C_{13}H_{15}N_{3}
- Molar mass: 213.284 g·mol^{−1}
- 3D model (JSmol): Interactive image
- SMILES: C1CN(CCN1)C2=NC3=CC=CC=C3C=C2
- InChI: InChI=1S/C13H15N3/c1-2-4-12-11(3-1)5-6-13(15-12)16-9-7-14-8-10-16/h1-6,14H,7-10H2; Key:XRXDAJYKGWNHTQ-UHFFFAOYSA-N

Quipazine, also known as 1-(2-quinolinyl)piperazine (2-QP), is a serotonergic drug of the arylpiperazine family and an analogue of 1-(2-pyridinyl)piperazine which is used in scientific research. It was first described in the 1960s and was originally intended as an antidepressant but was never developed or marketed for medical use. The effects of quipazine in humans include nausea, vomiting, gastrointestinal disturbances, diarrhea, and, at higher doses, psychedelic effects. Quipazine may represent the prototype of a novel structural class of psychedelic drugs.

== Use and effects ==
The effects and side effects of quipazine in humans have been described. At a dose of 25 mg orally, they included nausea, flatulence, gastrointestinal discomfort, and diarrhea, with no LSD-like subjective effects. Higher doses were not assessed due to serotonin 5-HT_{3} receptor-mediated side effects of nausea and gastrointestinal discomfort. An anecdotal report in one or more subjects, in which the dose of quipazine was said to be 0.5 mg (sic), described quipazine as producing low-dose mescaline-like effects followed by onset of dysphoria and nausea.

It was suggested by Jerrold C. Winter in 1994 that serotonin 5-HT_{3} receptor antagonists like ondansetron could allow for use of higher doses of quipazine and assessment of whether it produces clear psychedelic effects or not. Alexander Shulgin subsequently reported in The Shulgin Index (2011), based on an anonymous report dated to 2007, that quipazine in combination with a serotonin 5-HT_{3} receptor antagonist, presumably ondansetron, produced a "full psychedelic response".

== Interactions ==
Serotonin 5-HT_{3} receptor antagonists like ondansetron have been reported to block the nausea and vomiting induced by quipazine. Serotonin 5-HT_{2A} receptor antagonists like ketanserin have been reported to block the psychedelic-like effects of quipazine in animals.

== Pharmacology ==
=== Pharmacodynamics ===
Quipazine activities
Target	Affinity (K_{i}, nM)
5-HT_{1A}	230–>10,000
5-HT_{1B}	1,000
5-HT_{1D}	1,000–3,720
5-HT_{1E}	ND
5-HT_{1F}	ND
5-HT_{2A}	59–2,780 (K_{i}); 309 (EC_{50}); 62–71% (E_{max})
5-HT_{2B}	49–178 (K_{i}); 178 (EC_{50}); 17% (E_{max})
5-HT_{2C}	54–1,344 (K_{i}); 339 (EC_{50}); 57–69% (E_{max})
5-HT_{3}	1.23–4.0 (K_{i}); 1.0 (EC_{50}); ND (E_{max})
5-HT_{4}	>10,000 (guinea pig)
5-HT_{5A}	>10,000 (mouse)
5-HT_{6}	3,600
5-HT_{7}	3,033
α_{1}	>10,000 (rat)
α_{2}	5,000 (rat)
β_{1}	5,600
β_{2}	2,900 (rat)
D_{1}	>10,000
D_{2}	>10,000
D_{2}-like	3,920 (rat)
mACh	>10,000 (rat)
TAAR1	>10,000 (human) (EC_{50})
SERT	30–143
NET	ND
DAT	ND
Notes: The smaller the value, the more avidly the drug binds to the site. All proteins are human unless otherwise specified. Refs:

Quipazine is a serotonin 5-HT_{3} receptor agonist and to a lesser extent a serotonin 5-HT_{2A}, 5-HT_{2B}, and 5-HT_{2C} receptor agonist as well as serotonin reuptake inhibitor. It also shows affinity for serotonin 5-HT_{1} receptors, including the serotonin 5-HT_{1B} receptor and to a lesser extent the serotonin 5-HT_{1A} receptor. Activation of the serotonin 5-HT_{3} is implicated in inducing nausea and vomiting as well as anxiety, which has limited the potential clinical usefulness of quipazine.

Quipazine produces a head-twitch response and other psychedelic-consistent effects in animal studies including in mice, rats, and monkeys. These effects appear to be mediated by activation of the serotonin 5-HT_{2A} receptor, as they are blocked by serotonin 5-HT_{2A} receptor antagonists like ketanserin. The head twitches induced by quipazine are potentiated by the monoamine oxidase inhibitor (MAOI) pargyline. Based on this, it has been suggested that quipazine may act as a serotonin releasing agent and that it may induce the head twitch response by a dual action of serotonin 5-HT_{2A} receptor agonism and induction of serotonin release. However, a study found that quipazine only weakly stimulated serotonin release.

Besides the head-twitch response, quipazine fully substitutes for LSD and partially substitutes for mescaline in rodent drug discrimination tests. In addition, quipazine substitutes for DOM in rodents and monkeys and this is blocked by serotonin 5-HT_{2A} receptor antagonists like pizotyline and ketanserin. When quipazine is used as the training drug, LSD, mescaline, and psilocybin all fully substitute for quipazine. In monkeys, quipazine additionally produced LSD-like behavioral changes along with projectile vomiting. In contrast to primates, rodents generally lack an emetic response, and hence the nausea and vomiting that quipazine can induce may not be a limiting factor in this order of animals. Similarly to DOI, quipazine alters time perception in rodents.

In addition to its psychedelic-like effects, quipazine can produce antiaggressive effects in rodents. It can also produce tachycardia, including positive chronotropic and positive inotropic effects, through activation of the serotonin 5-HT_{3} receptor.

Although quipazine does not generalize to dextroamphetamine in drug discrimination tests of dextroamphetamine-trained rodents, dextroamphetamine and cathinone have been found to partially generalize to quipazine in assays of quipazine-trained rodents. In relation to this, it has been suggested that quipazine might possess some dopaminergic activity, as the discriminative stimulus properties of amphetamine appear to be mediated by dopamine signaling. Relatedly, quipazine has been said to act as a dopamine receptor agonist in addition to serotonin receptor agonist. Conversely however, the generalization may be due to serotonergic activities of amphetamine and cathinone. Fenfluramine has been found to fully generalize to quipazine, but levofenfluramine, in contrast to quipazine, did not generalize to dextroamphetamine.

Quipazine is said to differ in its pharmacology and effects from other serotonergic arylpiperazines like TFMPP and mCPP. Relatedly, unlike quipazine, neither TFMPP nor mCPP substitute for DOM in drug discrimination tests. In addition, DOM and TFMPP mutually antagonize each others' stimulus effects. In contrast to quipazine, TFMPP and mCPP show prominent bias or preference for the serotonin 5-HT_{2C} receptor over the serotonin 5-HT_{2A} receptor.

Quipazine is a very weak agonist of the human trace amine-associated receptor 1 (TAAR1).

== Chemistry ==
Quipazine is a substituted piperazine and quinoline.

=== Synthesis ===
Quipazine synthesis.

Quipazine is synthesized by reacting 2-chloroquinoline with piperazine.

=== Analogues ===
Quipazine is structurally related to 6-nitroquipazine (DU-24565), isoquipazine, 1-(2-naphthyl)piperazine (2-NP; 1-deazaquipazine), and 1-(1-naphthyl)piperazine (1-NP).

Novel analogues of quipazine with retained serotonin 5-HT_{2A} receptor agonism and reduced undesirable off-target activity such as serotonin 5-HT_{3} receptor agonism and associated adverse effects have been developed and characterized. A doctoral thesis on novel psychedelic quipazine analogues was published by Yilun Yang at Columbia University in August 2025. However, the thesis is embargoed until 2030. Another group, at Virginia Commonwealth University, has also developed novel psychedelic quipazine analogues, such as VCU-1012 (3-azaquipazine) and VCU-1021 (3-methoxyquipazine). WL479 (7-piperazinylquinolone) is a low-potency serotonin 5-HT_{2A} receptor agonist with minimal psychedelic-like activity as well. Other quipazine-like analogues with serotonin 5-HT_{2A} receptor agonist activity have additionally been described.

Chemical structures of quipazine analogues and derivatives
Quipazine

IHCH-6122

VCU-1021 (3-methoxyquipazine)

6-Nitroquipazine (DU-24565)

2-NP (1-deazaquipazine)

VCU-1012 (3-azaquipazine)

CPQ (4-aza-7-chloroquipazine)

WL479 (7-piperazinylquinolone)

== History ==
Quipazine was first described in the scientific literature by 1966. It was described as an antidepressant-like agent by 1971. The psychedelic-like effects of quipazine in animals were first described by 1977.

== Society and culture ==
=== Legal status ===
==== Canada ====
Quipazine is not a controlled substance in Canada as of 2025.

==== United States ====
Quipazine is not an explicitly controlled substance in the United States.

== See also ==
- Substituted piperazine
- 2C-B-PP
- CPQ
- FPPQ
- IHCH-6122
- ORG-37684
