= Alniditan =

Chemical compound

Clinical data
- Other names: R-91274; R91274
- Routes of administration: Oral
- Drug class: Serotonin 5-HT_{1B} and 5-HT_{1D} receptor agonist; Antimigraine agent; Ditan
- ATC code: None

Pharmacokinetic data
- Elimination half-life: 8–13 hours

Identifiers
- IUPAC name: N-[(2R)-3,4-dihydro-2H-chromen-2-ylmethyl]-N'-(1,4,5,6-tetrahydropyrimidin-2-yl)propane-1,3-diamine
- CAS Number: 152317-89-0; Dihydrochloride: 155428-00-5
- PubChem CID: 66004
- IUPHAR/BPS: 120
- ChemSpider: 59396
- UNII: B57Z82EOGE; Dihydrochloride: 54PE58MGKB
- KEGG: D02826
- ChEMBL: ChEMBL88240

Chemical and physical data
- Formula: C_{17}H_{26}N_{4}O
- Molar mass: 302.422 g·mol^{−1}
- 3D model (JSmol): Interactive image
- SMILES: C1CNC(=NC1)NCCCNCC2CCC3=CC=CC=C3O2
- InChI: InChI=1S/C17H26N4O/c1-2-6-16-14(5-1)7-8-15(22-16)13-18-9-3-10-19-17-20-11-4-12-21-17/h1-2,5-6,15,18H,3-4,7-13H2,(H2,19,20,21)/t15-/m1/s1; Key:QVSXOXCYXPQXMF-OAHLLOKOSA-N

Alniditan (INN, USAN; developmental code name R-91274) is a selective serotonin 5-HT_{1B} and 5-HT_{1D} receptor agonist with migraine-preventive effects which was never marketed. It was under development for treatment of migraine via subcutaneous injection in the 1990s and reached phase 3 clinical trials for this indication prior to the discontinuation of its development.

== Pharmacology ==
=== Pharmacodynamics ===
Alniditan activities
Target	Affinity (K_{i}, nM)
5-HT_{1A}	0.48–4.0 (K_{i}); 51–116 (EC_{50}); 79–~100% (E_{max})
5-HT_{1B}	0.39–2.5 (K_{i}); 1.0–17 (EC_{50}); 81% (E_{max})
5-HT_{1D}	0.4–2.5 (K_{i}); 1.1–6.3 (EC_{50}); ~100% (E_{max})
5-HT_{1E}	240–525 (K_{i}); 2,090–6,170 (EC_{50})
5-HT_{1F}	360–1,230 (K_{i}); 1,200–6,760 (EC_{50})
5-HT_{2A}	3,720 (K_{i}) or IA >10,000 (EC_{50})
5-HT_{2B}	132 (K_{i}); 71 (EC_{50})
5-HT_{2C}	2,930 (K_{i}) (pig); ND (EC_{50})
5-HT_{3}	IA (mouse)
5-HT_{4}	5,120 (guinea pig)
5-HT_{5A}	ND
5-HT_{6}	5,470 (rat)
5-HT_{7}	55 (K_{i}); 479 (EC_{50})
α_{1}	97 (rat)
α_{1A}–α_{1D}	ND
α_{1}	460 (rat)
α_{2A}	37
α_{2B}	170
α_{2B}	18
β_{1}, β_{2}	IA
β_{3}	ND
D_{1}	IA (rat)
D_{2}	1,950
D_{3}	280
D_{4}	80
D_{5}	ND
H_{1}	3,830 (guinea pig)
H_{2}–H_{4}	ND
mACh	IA (rat)
M_{1}–M_{5}	ND
I_{1}, I_{2}	ND
σ_{1}	40 (guinea pig)
σ_{2}	ND
TAAR1	ND
SERT	IA
NET	IA (rat)
DAT	IA (rat)
VMAT	365 (rat)
Notes: The smaller the value, the more avidly the drug binds to the site. All proteins are human unless otherwise specified. Refs:

Alniditan acts as a selective serotonin 5-HT_{1B} and 5-HT_{1D} receptor full agonist. To a much lesser extent, it is also a full agonist of the serotonin 5-HT_{1A} receptor and an agonist of the serotonin 5-HT_{2B} receptor. Conversely, alniditan is essentially inactive at the serotonin 5-HT_{1E}, 5-HT_{1F}, and 5-HT_{2A} receptors. The broad receptor interactions of alniditan have been studied and reported.

=== Pharmacokinetics ===
The elimination half-life of alniditan is relatively long at 8 to 13 hours.

== Chemistry ==
=== Synthesis ===
The sizeable number of serotonergic drugs for treating migraines all incorporate the indole nucleus found in serotonin itself. It is thus of interest that a compound based on a benzopyran manifests much the same activity.

Alniditan synthesis:

Alkylation of phenol with 2-bromobutyrolactone (2) leads to the ether (3). Oxidation of that product with chromium trioxide then leads to the substituted succinic anhydride (4). Treatment of anhydride with polyphosphoric acid leads to the acylation of the aromatic ring and the formation of the benzopyranone ring (5). The ketone is then selectively reduced by any of several methods, as, for example, conversion to a dithiolane followed by Mozingo reduction to 6. The carboxylic acid is next reduced to the corresponding aldehyde (7) by successive conversion to an acid chloride followed by hydrogenation in the presence of thiophene. A second hydrogenation in the presence of benzylamine leads to the reductive amination product (8). Michael addition of the amino group in 8 to acrylonitrile leads to a 1,4-addition and the formation of (9). Reduction of the nitrile affords the diamine (10). Reaction of this last diamine with tetrahydropyrimidine chloride (11), itself formed by treatment of trimethylene urea with phosphorus oxychloride, leads to the displacement of halogen by the terminal, and thus more accessible, amino group in (10). There is thus formed the serotonergic agent alniditan (12).

== See also ==
- Lasmiditan
