= Lu 35-138 =

Clinical data
- Other names: LU-35138; LU35138
- Routes of administration: Unspecified
- Drug class: Dopamine D_{4} receptor antagonist; Serotonin reuptake inhibitor
- ATC code: None

Identifiers
- IUPAC name: 1-[(3S)-3-[2-[4-(6-chloro-1H-indol-3-yl)-3,6-dihydro-2H-pyridin-1-yl]ethyl]-2,3-dihydroindol-1-yl]ethanone
- CAS Number: 209745-47-1
- PubChem CID: 9911899
- ChemSpider: 8087550
- UNII: 8SBZ5D77MS

Chemical and physical data
- Formula: C_{25}H_{26}ClN_{3}O
- Molar mass: 419.95 g·mol^{−1}
- 3D model (JSmol): Interactive image
- SMILES: CC(=O)N1C[C@H](C2=CC=CC=C21)CCN3CCC(=CC3)C4=CNC5=C4C=CC(=C5)Cl
- InChI: InChI=1S/C25H26ClN3O/c1-17(30)29-16-19(21-4-2-3-5-25(21)29)10-13-28-11-8-18(9-12-28)23-15-27-24-14-20(26)6-7-22(23)24/h2-8,14-15,19,27H,9-13,16H2,1H3/t19-/m1/s1; Key:YVIUVYJJSZFGCX-LJQANCHMSA-N

Lu 35-138 is a dual dopamine D_{4} receptor antagonist and serotonin reuptake inhibitor (SRI) among other actions which belongs to the tetrahydropyridinylindole group and was under development for the treatment of schizophrenia but was never marketed. Its route of administration is unspecified.

The drug shows high affinity for the dopamine D_{4} receptor (K_{i} = 5 nM) and is a competitive antagonist of this receptor (K_{b} = 8 nM). In addition, it is a potent serotonin reuptake inhibitor, with an IC_{50} of 3.2 nM. Subsequent research found that Lu 35-138 is a potent negative allosteric modulator or allosteric inhibitor of the serotonin transporter (SERT), with an IC_{50} of 43.8 nM in the later study. Lu 35-138 also shows affinity for the α_{1}-adrenergic receptor (K_{i} = 45 nM). Its affinities for various other monoamine receptors have been reported as well, for instance at the dopamine D_{2} receptor (K_{i} = 72 nM; 14.4-fold lower than for the dopamine D_{4} receptor) and serotonin 5-HT_{2A} receptor (K_{i} = 260 nM), with significant dopamine D_{2} receptor occupancy notably observed in vivo in rodents. In addition to its actions at monoaminergic targets, Lu 35-138 is a hERG blocker, with an IC_{50} of 270 nM. For comparison, haloperidol and sertindole had IC_{50} values for this action of 170 nM and 64 nM, respectively.

Similarly to many antidepressants, Lu 35-138 produces antiaggressive effects acutely and proaggressive effects with chronic administration in rodents. It reverses the hyperlocomotion induced by dextroamphetamine and phencyclidine (PCP) in rodents. However, it was unable to affect the hyperlocomotion induced by a high dose of dextroamphetamine, which was said to reflect a preferential action on limbic versus striatal structures. The drug also reduced dextroamphetamine-induced disruption of prepulse inhibition. Continuous administration of Lu 35-138 reduced the number of spontaneously active dopaminergic neurons in the ventral tegmental area (VTA), which was said to be consistent with antipsychotic-like activity. Lu 35-138 did not produce catalepsy in rodents or dystonia in monkeys, suggesting low risk of extrapyramidal symptoms (EPS). Due to unfavorable physicochemical properties, the drug has been found to have very low oral bioavailability of less than 5% in rats.

Lu 35-138 was first described in the scientific literature by 2002. It was under development by Lundbeck in Denmark. The drug reached phase 2 clinical trials for schizophrenia prior to the discontinuation of its development in December 2003.

== See also ==
- Tetrahydropyridinylindole
- Cyclized tryptamine
- List of investigational antipsychotics
- Sertindole
- Lu AF35700 (d8-zicronapine)
- Sonepiprazole
