= C12H13ClN4 =

The molecular formula C_{12}H_{13}ClN_{4} (molar mass: 248.71 g/mol) may refer to:

- Pyrimethamine
- 6-Chloro-2-(1-piperazinyl)quinoxaline
