= 6-Nitroquipazine =

Chemical compound

Clinical data
- Other names: DU-24565; DU24565; DU-24,565
- ATC code: None

Legal status
- Legal status: In general: uncontrolled

Identifiers
- IUPAC name: 6-nitro-2-piperazin-1-yl-quinoline
- CAS Number: 77372-73-7
- PubChem CID: 5012
- ChemSpider: 4837
- UNII: 28M0X094BH
- ChEMBL: ChEMBL41140
- CompTox Dashboard (EPA): DTXSID7044001

Chemical and physical data
- Formula: C_{13}H_{14}N_{4}O_{2}
- Molar mass: 258.281 g·mol^{−1}
- 3D model (JSmol): Interactive image
- SMILES: [O-][N+](=O)c3cc1c(nc(cc1)N2CCNCC2)cc3
- InChI: InChI=1S/C13H14N4O2/c18-17(19)11-2-3-12-10(9-11)1-4-13(15-12)16-7-5-14-6-8-16/h1-4,9,14H,5-8H2; Key:GGDBEAVVGFNWIA-UHFFFAOYSA-N

6-Nitroquipazine (developmental code name DU-24565) is a potent and selective serotonin reuptake inhibitor used in scientific research.

6-Nitroquipazine has been found to inhibit melanogenesis in-vitro, suggesting that it can be used for skin whitening.

== See also ==
- Substituted piperazine
- Quipazine
- CPQ
