= VCU-1012 =

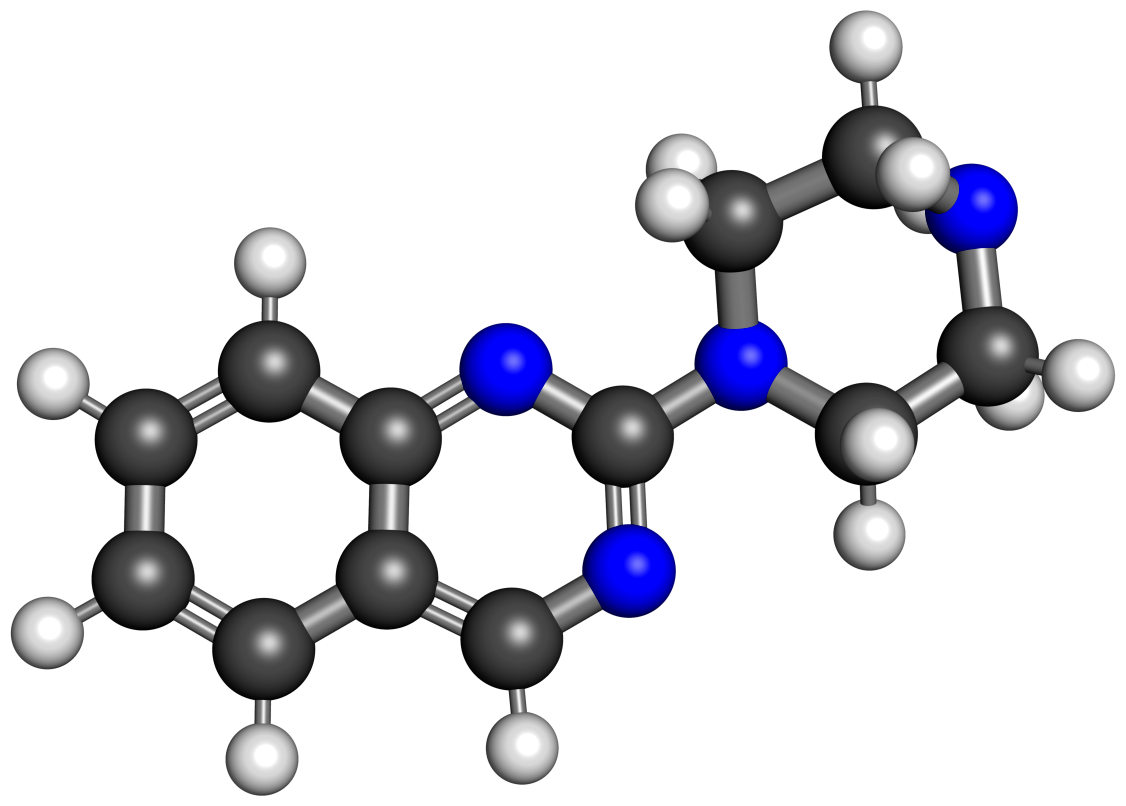

Clinical data
- Other names: VCU1012; 2-Piperazinylquinazoline; 1-Quinazolin-2-ylpiperazine; 3-Azaquipazine
- Drug class: Serotonin 5-HT_{2A} receptor agonist; Serotonergic psychedelic; Hallucinogen
- ATC code: None

Identifiers
- IUPAC name: 2-piperazin-1-ylquinazoline
- CAS Number: 51047-61-1
- PubChem CID: 6423266
- ChemSpider: 4928763
- CompTox Dashboard (EPA): DTXSID201308966

Chemical and physical data
- Formula: C_{12}H_{14}N_{4}
- Molar mass: 214.272 g·mol^{−1}
- 3D model (JSmol): Interactive image
- SMILES: C1CN(CCN1)C2=NC3=CC=CC=C3C=N2
- InChI: InChI=1S/C12H14N4/c1-2-4-11-10(3-1)9-14-12(15-11)16-7-5-13-6-8-16/h1-4,9,13H,5-8H2; Key:NRQJIAVOKMKUOR-UHFFFAOYSA-N

VCU-1012, also known as 1-quinazolin-2-ylpiperazine or as 3-azaquipazine, is a psychedelic drug of the arylpiperazine family related to quipazine (1-(2-quinolinyl)piperazine). It is a serotonin 5-HT_{2A} receptor agonist and produces psychedelic-like effects in rodents similarly to quipazine, but lacks quipazine's serotonin 5-HT_{3} receptor agonism and associated gastrointestinal adverse effects like nausea and vomiting. The drug represents a novel structural class of psychedelics distinct from existing scaffolds.

== Pharmacology ==
=== Pharmacodynamics ===
VCU-1012 is an agonist of the serotonin 5-HT_{2A} receptor. It shows about half the affinity of quipazine for the serotonin 5-HT_{2A} receptor (K_{i} = 986 nM and 1,777 nM, respectively). The drug is a partial agonist of the serotonin 5-HT_{2A} receptor, with about half the activational potency of quipazine (VCU-1012, EC_{50} = 1,550 nM; E_{max} = 46%; quipazine, EC_{50} = 240 nM; E_{max} = 56%).

In addition to the serotonin 5-HT_{2A} receptor, VCU-1012 shows high affinity for the serotonin 5-HT_{2B} receptor (K_{i} = 24–31 nM) and for the 5-HT_{3} receptor (K_{i} = 8.3–14 nM). It also shows affinity for a variety of other receptors and for monoamine transporters, including the norepinephrine transporter (NET) and the serotonin transporter (SERT). Although VCU-1012 binds to the serotonin 5-HT_{3} receptor, unlike quipazine, it does not act as an agonist of this receptor. Relatedly, VCU-1012 did not produce the gastrointestinal effects of quipazine in rodents and would be expected to lack associated side effects like nausea and vomiting in humans. It is unknown whether VCU-1012 acts pharmacologically as a serotonin 5-HT_{3} receptor antagonist. It is also unclear whether it acts as an agonist or antagonist at the serotonin 5-HT_{2B} receptor.

The drug dose-dependently and robustly induces the head-twitch response, a behavioral proxy of psychedelic effects, in rodents. This is fully blocked by the serotonin 5-HT_{2A} receptor antagonist volinanserin. VCU-1012 produces prolonged antidepressant-like effects in rodents. It also produces anxiolytic-like effects. The drug produces psychoplastogenic effects as well, which were mediated by serotonin 5-HT_{2A} receptor activation.

== Chemistry ==
VCU-1012, along with quipazine, represents a novel structural class of psychedelics distinct from tryptamines, phenethylamines, and lysergamides.

=== Synthesis ===
The chemical synthesis of VCU-1012 has been described. VCU-1012 was synthesised by reacting 2-chloroquinazoline with excess piperazine in anhydrous toluene under reflux. The resulting free base was converted to its hydrochloride salt using hydrogen chloride in diethyl ether, followed by recrystallisation from methanol.

=== Analogues ===
Other novel psychedelic analogues of quipazine besides VCU-1012 have also been described. Notable psychedelic analogues of VCU-1012 besides quipazine include 2-naphthylpiperazine (2-NP) and VCU-1021 (3-methoxyquipazine).

== History ==
VCU-1012 was first described in the scientific literature by Jessica Maltman and Richard Glennon and colleagues at Virginia Commonwealth University (VCU) in 2024. It may have therapeutic potential and possible medical applications.

== See also ==
- Arylpiperazine
- Quipazine
- List of miscellaneous serotonin 5-HT_{2A} receptor agonists
