= Ditan =

Drug class

- Drug class
- Lasmiditan

Class identifiers
- Use: Migraine
- Biological target: 5-HT_{1F} receptor

Legal status

Ditans are a class of abortive medication for the treatment of migraines. The first ditan, Eli Lilly's lasmiditan, was approved by the FDA in 2019.

Ditans selectively bind to the 5-HT_{1F} receptor subtype. A number of triptans have been shown to act on this subtype as well, but only after their affinity for 5-HT_{1B} and 5-HT_{1D} has been made responsible for their anti-migraine activity. The lack of affinity for these receptors might result in fewer side effects related to vasoconstriction compared to triptans in susceptible patients, such as those with ischemic heart disease, Raynaud's phenomenon or after a myocardial infarction. A 1998 review has found such side effects to rarely occur in most patients taking triptans.

One clinical trial showed that 200 mg lasmiditan provided pain freedom by 2 hours in 32% of individuals with migraine attacks of moderate or severe intensity, and 100 mg lasmiditan did so in 28%, compared with 15% after a placebo. Subsequently, these results were confirmed in another trial.
