= EMD-386088 =

Chemical compound

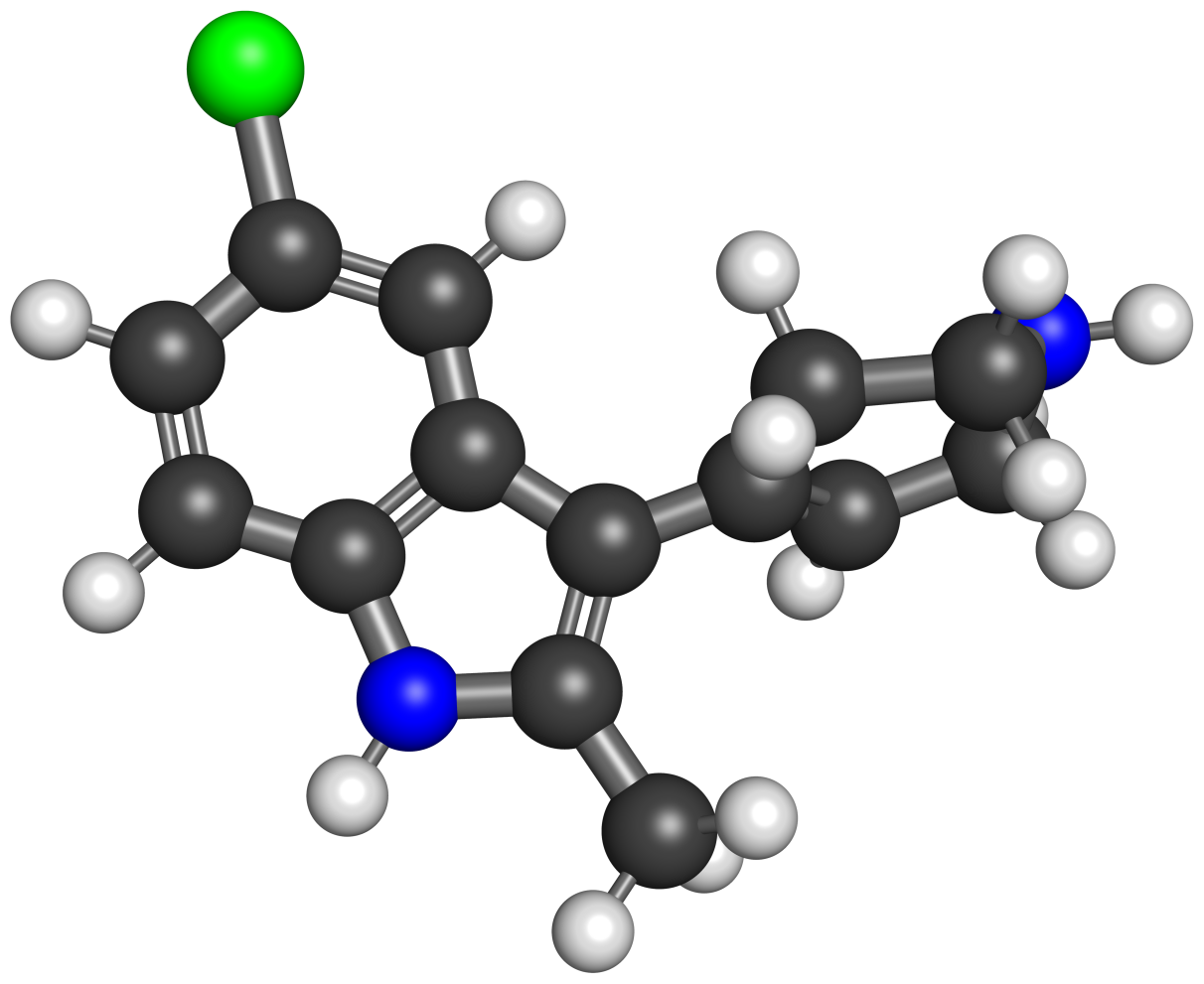

Clinical data
- Other names: EMD386088; EMD-386,088; 2-Methyl-5-chloro-THPI; 2-Me-5-Cl-THPI
- ATC code: None

Identifiers
- IUPAC name: 5-chloro-2-methyl-3-(1,2,3,6-tetrahydro-4-pyridinyl)-1H-indole
- CAS Number: 54635-62-0
- PubChem CID: 10131112
- ChemSpider: 8306627
- UNII: URZ93Y3D9J
- CompTox Dashboard (EPA): DTXSID30436055

Chemical and physical data
- Formula: C_{14}H_{14}ClN_{2}
- Molar mass: 245.73 g·mol^{−1}
- 3D model (JSmol): Interactive image
- SMILES: Clc2cc1c(cc2)[nH]c(C)c1C=3CCNCC=3
- InChI: InChI=1S/C14H15ClN2/c1-9-14(10-4-6-16-7-5-10)12-8-11(15)2-3-13(12)17-9/h2-4,8,16-17H,5-7H2,1H3; Key:BPPGPYJBCVXILI-UHFFFAOYSA-N

EMD-386088 is an tetrahydropyridinylindole derivative which is used in scientific research. It acts as a potent 5-HT_{6} receptor partial agonist, with a K_{i} of 1 nM, a significantly higher affinity than older 5-HT_{6} agonists such as EMDT, although it possesses moderate affinity for the 5-HT_{3} receptor as well. Subsequent research has determined that EMD-386088 is also a dopamine reuptake inhibitor and that this action is involved in the antidepressant-like effects of the drug in rodents.

EMD-386088 can be further reacted with a butyrophenone sidechain.

== See also ==
- Tetrahydropyridinylindole
- Substituted tryptamine § Related compounds
- 2-Methyltryptamine
- EMDT
- RU-24,969
- RU-28253
- ST-1936
