= Tetrahydropyridinylindole =

Tetrahydropyridinylindoles (THPIs) are a group of chemical compounds related to the tryptamines. They can be subdivided into 3-(1,2,5,6-tetrahydropyridin-4-yl)indoles (4-THPIs or simply THPIs) and 3-(1,2,5,6-tetrahydropyridin-3-yl)indoles (3-THPIs). 3-THPIs are cyclized tryptamines and include RS134-49, RU-28253, and NEtPhOH-3-THPI, whereas 4-THPIs are not technically tryptamines but are closely related, with examples including THPI, RU-24969 (5-MeO-THPI), EMD-386088, MTHPI, tepirindole (RU-27592), Lu 35-138, and LY-367265. Tetrahydropyridinylindoles of both of the preceding groups are known to act as serotonin receptor modulators.

Chemical structures of selected 4-tetrahydropyridinylindoles (4-THPIs)
THPI

RU-24969 (5-MeO-THPI)

EMD-386088

MTHPI

5-MeO-MTHPI

Tepirindole (RU-27592)

Lu 35-138

LY-367265
Chemical structures of selected 3-tetrahydropyridinylindoles (3-THPIs)
3-THPI

RS134-49

RU-28253

NEtPhOH-3-THPI

== See also ==
- Substituted tryptamine § Related compounds
- Cyclized tryptamine
- Piperidinylindole
