= FPPQ =

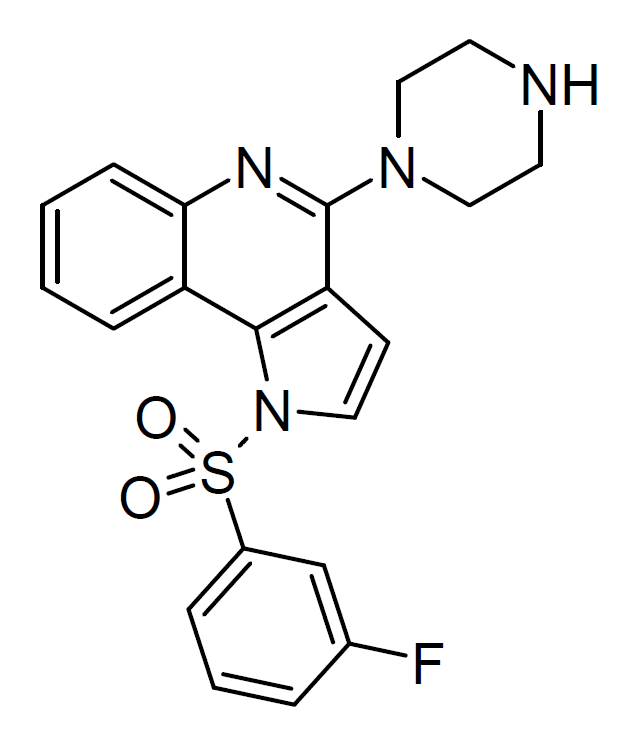

Identifiers
- IUPAC name: 1-(3-fluorophenyl)sulfonyl-4-piperazin-1-ylpyrrolo[3,2-c]quinoline
- CAS Number: 1648745-46-3
- PubChem CID: 90469115
- ChemSpider: 115006488
- ChEMBL: ChEMBL4867565

Chemical and physical data
- Formula: C_{21}H_{19}FN_{4}O_{2}S
- Molar mass: 410.47 g·mol^{−1}
- 3D model (JSmol): Interactive image
- SMILES: C1CN(CCN1)C2=NC3=CC=CC=C3C4=C2C=CN4S(=O)(=O)C5=CC=CC(=C5)F
- InChI: InChI=1S/C21H19FN4O2S/c22-15-4-3-5-16(14-15)29(27,28)26-11-8-18-20(26)17-6-1-2-7-19(17)24-21(18)25-12-9-23-10-13-25/h1-8,11,14,23H,9-10,12-13H2; Key:QNKGTIWNFNPEJL-UHFFFAOYSA-N

FPPQ is an experimental drug related to quipazine, which acts as a selective antagonist of both the 5-HT_{3} and 5-HT_{6} serotonin receptors. It has antipsychotic and memory-enhancing effects in animal studies.
