= F-11461 =

Chemical compound

Clinical data
- Other names: F-11461; F11461

Identifiers
- IUPAC name: 2-[4-[4-[7-(Methoxy-^{11}C)-1-naphthalenyl]-1-piperazinyl]butyl]-4-methyl-1,2,4-triazine-3,5(2H,4H)-dione
- CAS Number: 874471-25-7
- PubChem CID: 10324985
- ChemSpider: 9850903
- UNII: RKG24J8KJR
- ChEMBL: ChEMBL199824

Chemical and physical data
- Formula: C_{23}H_{29}N_{5}O_{3}
- Molar mass: 423.517 g·mol^{−1}
- 3D model (JSmol): Interactive image
- SMILES: CN1C(=O)C=NN(C1=O)CCCCN2CCN(CC2)C3=CC=CC4=C3C=C(C=C4)OC
- InChI: InChI=InChI=1S/C23H29N5O3/c1-25-22(29)17-24-28(23(25)30)11-4-3-10-26-12-14-27(15-13-26)21-7-5-6-18-8-9-19(31-2)16-20(18)21/h5-9,16-17H,3-4,10-15H2,1-2H3; Key:GKTQBPYMIGXPKG-UHFFFAOYSA-N

F-11,461 is a naphthylpiperazine drug that acts as an agonist of the 5-HT_{1A} receptor (K_{i} = 1.36 nM) that has been used as a radioligand in PET studies. It possesses modest affinity for the 5-HT_{7} (K_{i} = 9.1 nM) and D_{4} (K_{i} = 8.5 nM) receptors, although the interaction of F-11,461 with these receptors is not detectable with PET due to their relative scarcity in the brain.

== See also ==
- Naphthylpiperazine
- Befiradol
- 8-OH-DPAT
