= S-14671 =

Chemical compound

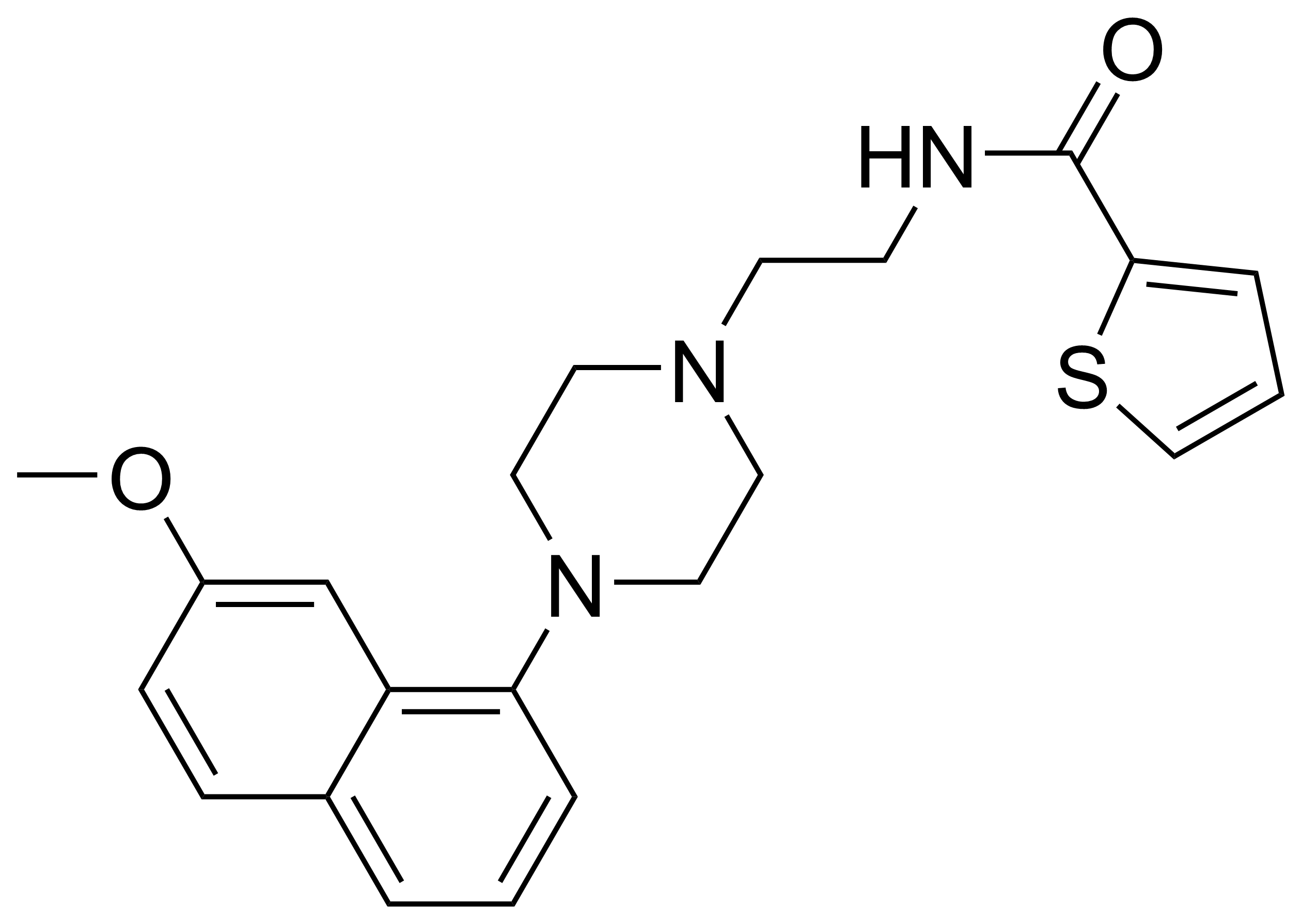

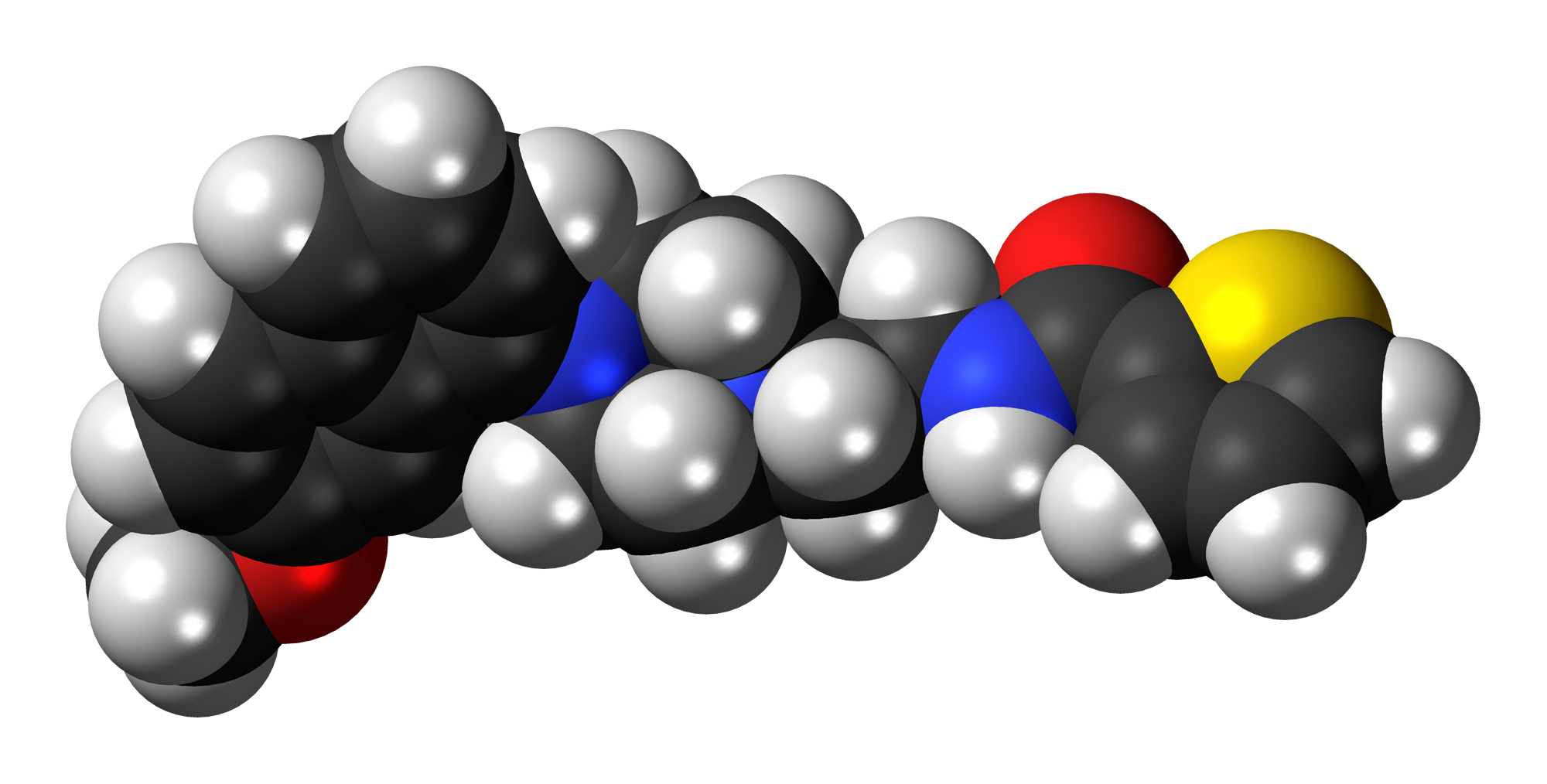

Clinical data
- ATC code: none

Identifiers
- IUPAC name: N-{2-[4-(7-methoxynaphthalen-1-yl)piperazin-1-yl]ethyl}thiophene-2-carboxamide
- CAS Number: 135722-27-9
- PubChem CID: 131907
- IUPHAR/BPS: 25
- ChemSpider: 116529
- CompTox Dashboard (EPA): DTXSID60159503

Chemical and physical data
- Formula: C_{22}H_{25}N_{3}O_{2}S
- Molar mass: 395.52 g·mol^{−1}

S-14671 is a naphthylpiperazine derivative which acts as a 5-HT_{1A} receptor agonist (pK_{i} = 9.3) with high efficacy and exceptional in vivo potency, and also as a 5-HT_{2A} and 5-HT_{2C} receptor antagonist (both are pK_{i} = 7.8). It displays only low and non-significant affinity for 5-HT_{1B} and 5-HT_{3} sites.

In producing 5-HT_{1A}-mediated effects such as hypothermia and spontaneous tail flicks in rodents, S-14671 is active at doses as low as 5 μg subcutaneously, and is about 10-fold more potent than 8-OH-DPAT and 100-fold more potent than flesinoxan and buspirone. Other 5-HT_{1A}-mediated effects of S-14671 include induction of flat-body posture, corticosterone secretion, inhibition of morphine-induced antinociception, and attenuation of the electrical activity of the dorsal raphe nucleus.

S-14671 has been found to possess powerful efficacy in the rodent forced swim test and in the pigeon conflict test, indicating marked antidepressant and anxiolytic effects, respectively, of which are also 5-HT_{1A}-mediated. It has never been trialed in humans, perhaps due to its potency being too great.

== See also ==
- CSP-2503
- Naphthylpiperazine
