= MTHPI =

Clinical data
- Other names: 3-MTPI; 3-(1-Methyl-1,2,3,6-tetrahydropyrid-4-yl)indole; N′-Methyl-THPI
- Drug class: Serotonin receptor modulator
- ATC code: None

Identifiers
- IUPAC name: 3-(1-methyl-3,6-dihydro-2H-pyridin-4-yl)-1H-indole
- CAS Number: 17403-03-1
- PubChem CID: 152215
- ChemSpider: 134164
- ChEMBL: ChEMBL26655

Chemical and physical data
- Formula: C_{14}H_{16}N_{2}
- Molar mass: 212.296 g·mol^{−1}
- 3D model (JSmol): Interactive image
- SMILES: CN1CCC(=CC1)C2=CNC3=CC=CC=C32
- InChI: InChI=1S/C14H16N2/c1-16-8-6-11(7-9-16)13-10-15-14-5-3-2-4-12(13)14/h2-6,10,15H,7-9H2,1H3; Key:IUENQRYBZHHPBN-UHFFFAOYSA-N

MTHPI, also known as 3-(1-methyl-1,2,3,6-tetrahydropyrid-4-yl)indole (3-MTPI), is a serotonin receptor modulator of the tetrahydropyridinylindole group related to the psychedelic drug dimethyltryptamine (DMT). Though it is not technically a tryptamine itself, MTHPI can be regarded as a constrained analogue of DMT.

The drug shows affinity for the serotonin 5-HT_{1}, 5-HT_{1A}, and 5-HT_{2A} receptors (K_{i} = 217 nM, 144 nM, and 71 nM, respectively). Its affinity for the serotonin 5-HT_{2A} receptor was 8-fold higher than that of DMT. Besides serotonin receptors, MTHPI also shows affinity for the serotonin transporter (SERT) (IC_{50} = 690 nM).

The chemical synthesis of MTHPI has been described. Derivatives of MTHPI such as 5-MeO-MTHPI, 2-Me-MTHPI, and 5-MeO-2-Me-MTHPI have also been described. 5-MeO-MTHPI showed 11-fold lower affinity for the serotonin 5-HT_{2A} receptor and 6-fold higher affinity for the serotonin 5-HT_{1A} receptor compared to MTHPI. Conversely, the 2-methylated analogues showed markedly reduced affinities for the assessed serotonin receptors. Various other derivatives of MTHPI, acting as monoamine transporter modulators, have been described as well.

MTHPI was first described in the scientific literature by Ethan Will Taylor and colleagues by 1987.

== See also ==
- Cyclized tryptamine
- Tetrahydropyridinylindole
- Substituted tryptamine § Related compounds
- MPTP
- RU-24969
- SN-22
