= S-14506 =

Names
- Preferred IUPAC name 4-Fluoro-N-{2-[4-(7-methoxynaphthalen-1-yl)piperazin-1-yl]ethyl}benzamide

Identifiers
CAS Number	135722-25-7
3D model (JSmol)	Interactive image
ChEBI	CHEBI:64101
ChemSpider	116528
IUPHAR/BPS	24
PubChem CID	131906
UNII	YVO8LE53MI
CompTox Dashboard (EPA)	DTXSID9043986
- InChI: InChI=1S/C24H26FN3O2/c1-30-21-10-7-18-3-2-4-23(22(18)17-21)28-15-13-27(14-16-28)12-11-26-24(29)19-5-8-20(25)9-6-19/h2-10,17H,11-16H2,1H3,(H,26,29) Key: IFMQODYDAUKKEN-UHFFFAOYSA-N; InChI=1/C24H26FN3O2/c1-30-21-10-7-18-3-2-4-23(22(18)17-21)28-15-13-27(14-16-28)12-11-26-24(29)19-5-8-20(25)9-6-19/h2-10,17H,11-16H2,1H3,(H,26,29) Key: IFMQODYDAUKKEN-UHFFFAOYAH
- SMILES: COC1=CC2=C(C=CC=C2N3CCN(CC3)CCNC(=O)C4=CC=C(C=C4)F)C=C1

Properties
Chemical formula	C_{24}H_{26}FN_{3}O_{2}
Molar mass	407.489 g·mol^{−1}
- Except where otherwise noted, data are given for materials in their standard state (at 25 °C [77 °F], 100 kPa). Infobox references

S-14,506 is a naphthylpiperazine, a 5-HT1A receptor agonist, and a dopamine receptor antagonist.

== See also ==
- Naphthylpiperazine
