= Diphenylethylenediamine =

Names
- Preferred IUPAC name 1,2-Diphenylethane-1,2-diamine
- Other names 1,2-Diphenyl-1,2-diaminoethane; DPEN; Stilbenediamine stien

Identifiers
CAS Number	35132-20-8
3D model (JSmol)	Interactive image
ChEMBL	ChEMBL467308
ChemSpider	5305408
PubChem CID	6931238
UNII	JZ5DV7MKY6
CompTox Dashboard (EPA)	DTXSID90915119
- InChI: InChI=1S/C14H16N2/c15-13(11-7-3-1-4-8-11)14(16)12-9-5-2-6-10-12/h1-10,13-14H,15-16H2/t13-,14-/m0/s1 Key: PONXTPCRRASWKW-KBPBESRZSA-N; InChI=1/C14H16N2/c15-13(11-7-3-1-4-8-11)14(16)12-9-5-2-6-10-12/h1-10,13-14H,15-16H2/t13-,14-/m0/s1 Key: PONXTPCRRASWKW-KBPBESRZBK
- SMILES: N[C@@H](c1ccccc1)[C@H](c2ccccc2)N

Properties
Chemical formula	C_{14}H_{16}N_{2}
Molar mass	212.29 g/mol
Appearance	White solid
Melting point	79 to 83 °C (174 to 181 °F; 352 to 356 K)
Solubility in water	Slightly

Related compounds
- Except where otherwise noted, data are given for materials in their standard state (at 25 °C [77 °F], 100 kPa). verify (what is ?) Infobox references

1,2-Diphenyl-1,2-ethylenediamine, DPEN, is an organic compound with the formula H_{2}NCHPhCHPhNH_{2}, where Ph is phenyl (C_{6}H_{5}). DPEN exists as three stereoisomers: meso and two enantiomers S,S- and R,R-. The chiral diastereomers are used in asymmetric hydrogenation. Both diastereomers are bidentate ligands.

== Preparation and optical resolution ==
1,2-Diphenyl-1,2-ethylenediamine can be prepared from benzil by reductive amination. DPEN can be obtained as both the chiral and meso diastereomers, depending on the relative stereochemistry of the two CHPhNH_{2} subunits. The chiral diastereomer, which is of greater value, can be resolved into the R,R- and S,S- enantiomers using tartaric acid as the resolving agent. In methanol, the R,R enantiomer has a specific rotation of [α]_{23} +106±1°.

== Asymmetric catalysis ==
N-tosylated derivative, TsDPEN, is a ligand precursor for catalysts for asymmetric transfer hydrogenation. For example, (cymene)Ru(S,S-TsDPEN) catalyzes the hydrogenation of benzil into (R,R)-hydrobenzoin. In this reaction, formate serves as the source of H_{2}:

PhC(O)C(O)Ph + 2 H_{2} → PhCH(OH)CH(OH)Ph (R,R isomer)

This transformation is an example of desymmetrization, the symmetric molecule benzil is converted to the dissymmetric product.

DPEN is a key ingredients of Ryōji Noyori's 2nd generation ruthenium-based chiral hydration catalyst, for which he earned the Nobel Prize in Chemistry in 2001.
