= 6-Chloro-2-(1-piperazinyl)quinoxaline =

CPQ

Clinical data
- Other names: CPQ; 4-Aza-7-chloroquipazine
- Drug class: Selective serotonin reuptake inhibitor (SSRI)
- ATC code: None

Identifiers
- IUPAC name: 6-chloro-2-piperazin-1-ylquinoxaline
- CAS Number: 55686-92-5
- PubChem CID: 12686435
- ChemSpider: 21375209
- ChEMBL: ChEMBL6670

Chemical and physical data
- Formula: C_{12}H_{13}ClN_{4}
- Molar mass: 248.71 g·mol^{−1}
- 3D model (JSmol): Interactive image
- SMILES: C1CN(CCN1)C2=CN=C3C=C(C=CC3=N2)Cl
- InChI: InChI=1S/C12H13ClN4/c13-9-1-2-10-11(7-9)15-8-12(16-10)17-5-3-14-4-6-17/h1-2,7-8,14H,3-6H2; Key:PSJNXVYMPJQNGI-UHFFFAOYSA-N

6-Chloro-2-(1-piperazinyl)quinoxaline (CPQ), also known as 4-aza-7-chloroquipazine, is a selective serotonin reuptake inhibitor (SSRI) of the arylpiperazine family related to quipazine. It is highly potent and shows high selectivity for inhibiting the reuptake of serotonin over the reuptake of norepinephrine and dopamine. The drug potentiates the head-twitch response (HTR) and forepaw clonus induced by 5-hydroxytryptophan (5-HTP) and antagonizes para-chloromethamphetamine (PCMA)-induced HTR and serotonergic neurotoxicity, effects which may be attributed to its serotonin reuptake inhibition. The chemical synthesis of CPQ has been described. CPQ was described in the scientific literature in 1978.

== See also ==
- Substituted piperazine
- Quipazine
- 6-Nitroquipazine
- 1-(2-Naphthyl)piperazine (2-NP)
