= RU-28253 =

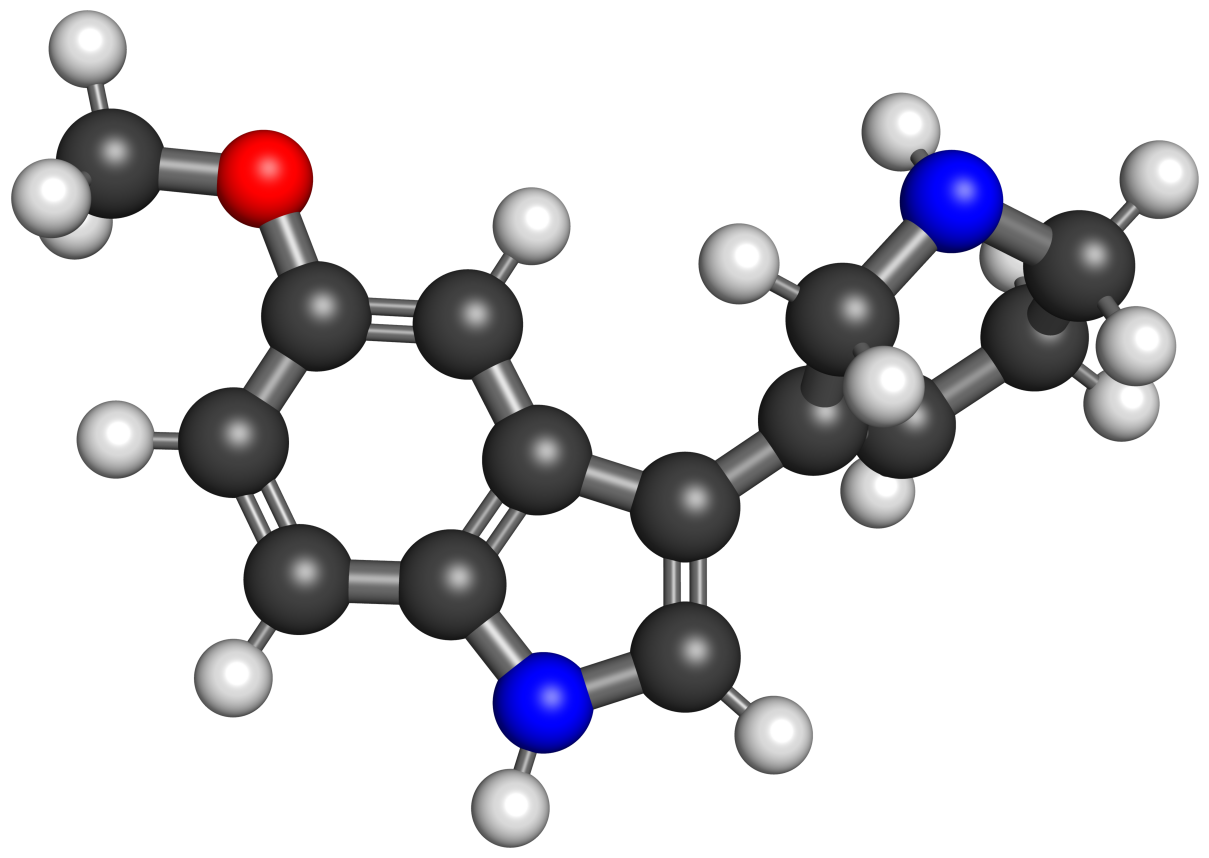

Clinical data
- Other names: RU28253; 5-MeO-3-THPI
- Drug class: Non-selective serotonin receptor agonist
- ATC code: None

Identifiers
- IUPAC name: 5-methoxy-3-(1,2,3,6-tetrahydropyridin-5-yl)-1H-indole
- PubChem CID: 10220205
- ChemSpider: 8395697
- ChEMBL: ChEMBL101487

Chemical and physical data
- Formula: C_{14}H_{16}N_{2}O
- Molar mass: 228.295 g·mol^{−1}
- 3D model (JSmol): Interactive image
- SMILES: COC1=CC2=C(C=C1)NC=C2C3=CCCNC3
- InChI: InChI=1S/C14H16N2O/c1-17-11-4-5-14-12(7-11)13(9-16-14)10-3-2-6-15-8-10/h3-5,7,9,15-16H,2,6,8H2,1H3; Key:WBJMGSVSSCEGFV-UHFFFAOYSA-N

RU-28253 is a non-selective serotonin receptor agonist of the tryptamine, 5-methoxytryptamine, and tetrahydropyridinylindole families. It is a tetrahydropyridylindole and a conformationally constrained analogue of 5-MeO-DMT.

The drug shows high affinity for the serotonin 5-HT_{1A} receptor (K_{i} = 5.7 nM) and lower affinity for the serotonin 5-HT_{2A} receptor (K_{i} = 230 nM). Its affinities for these receptors were higher than those of dimethyltryptamine (DMT). RU-28253 is described as a potent agonist of the serotonin 5-HT_{1} and 5-HT_{2} receptors, including of the serotonin 5-HT_{1B} receptor, and is also an agonist of the serotonin 5-HT_{4} receptor.

RU-28253 was first described in the scientific literature by 1983.

== See also ==
- Cyclized tryptamine
- Tetrahydropyridinylindole
- VU6067416
- RS134-49
- NEtPhOH-THPI
- (R)-69
- RU-24969
- EMD-386088
- SN-22
- MPMI
- Pyr-T
- Pip-T
