= Naratriptan =

Chemical compound

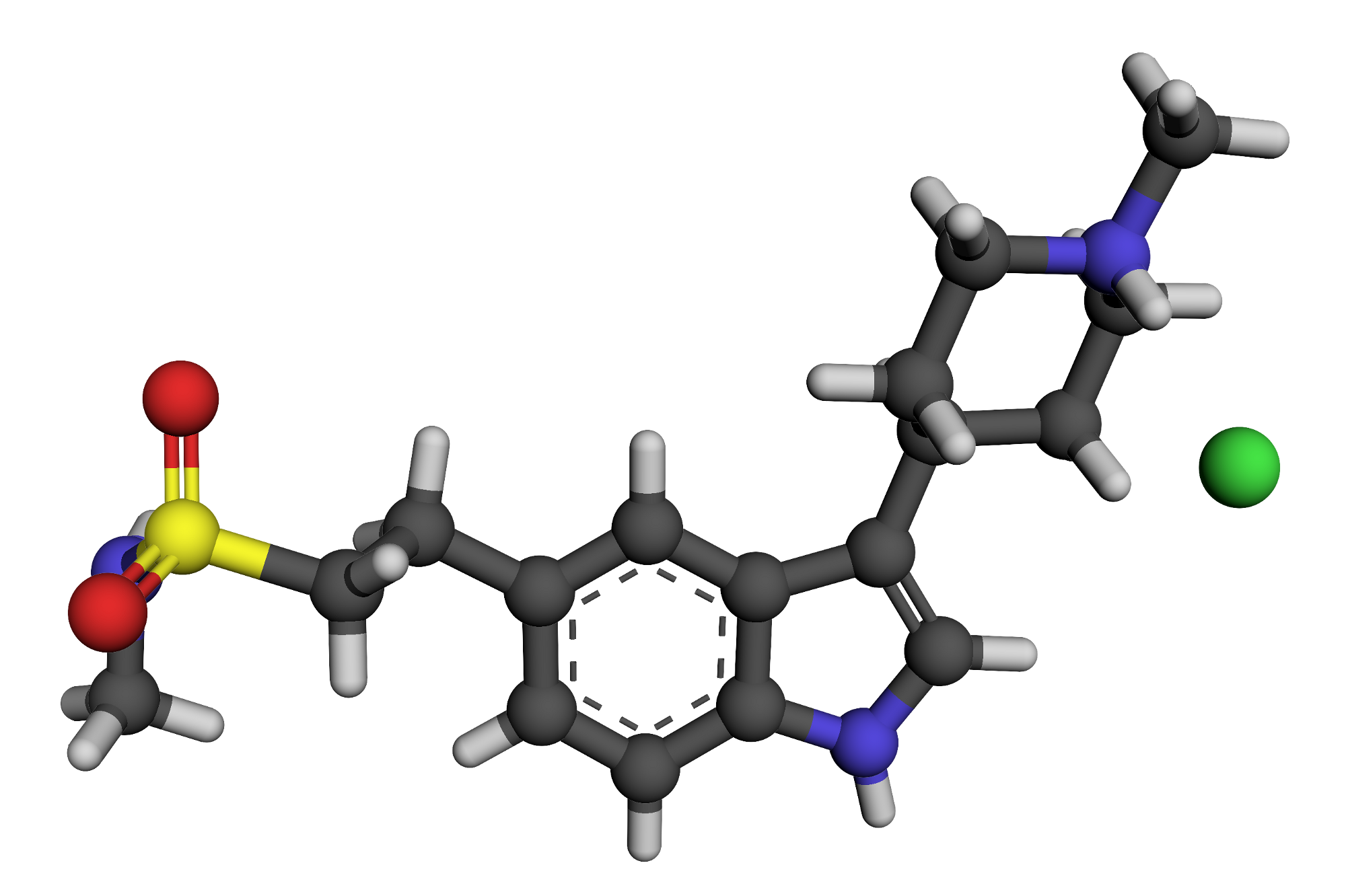

Clinical data
- Trade names: Amerge, Naramig, others
- Other names: GR-85548; GR85548; GR-85548A; GR85548A; SMP-948; SMP948
- AHFS/Drugs.com: Monograph
- MedlinePlus: a601083
- Pregnancy category: AU: B3
- Routes of administration: Oral
- Drug class: Serotonin 5-HT_{1B}, 5-HT_{1D}, 5-HT_{1E}, and 5-HT_{1F} receptor agonist; Antimigraine agent; Triptan
- ATC code: N02CC02 (WHO)

Legal status
- Legal status: In general: ℞ (Prescription only)

Pharmacokinetic data
- Bioavailability: 74%
- Metabolism: Hepatic
- Elimination half-life: 5–8 hours
- Excretion: Renal

Identifiers
- IUPAC name: N-methyl-2-[3-(1-methylpiperidin-4-yl)-1H-indol-5-yl]ethanesulfonamide
- CAS Number: 121679-13-8
- PubChem CID: 4440
- IUPHAR/BPS: 45
- DrugBank: DB00952
- ChemSpider: 4287
- UNII: QX3KXL1ZA2
- KEGG: D08255
- ChEBI: CHEBI:7478
- ChEMBL: ChEMBL1278
- CompTox Dashboard (EPA): DTXSID7023354
- ECHA InfoCard: 100.121.501

Chemical and physical data
- Formula: C_{17}H_{25}N_{3}O_{2}S
- Molar mass: 335.47 g·mol^{−1}
- 3D model (JSmol): Interactive image
- SMILES: O=S(=O)(NC)CCc3ccc1c(c(c[nH]1)C2CCN(C)CC2)c3
- InChI: InChI=1S/C17H25N3O2S/c1-18-23(21,22)10-7-13-3-4-17-15(11-13)16(12-19-17)14-5-8-20(2)9-6-14/h3-4,11-12,14,18-19H,5-10H2,1-2H3; Key:AMKVXSZCKVJAGH-UHFFFAOYSA-N

Naratriptan, sold under the brand names Amerge and Naramig among others, is a triptan drug marketed by GlaxoSmithKline and is used for the treatment of migraine headaches. It is a selective serotonin 5-HT_{1} receptor family agonist.

It was patented in 1987 and approved for medical use in 1997.

== Medical uses ==
Naratriptan is used for the treatment of the acute migraine attacks and the symptoms of migraine, including severe, throbbing headaches that sometimes are accompanied by nausea and sensitivity to sound or light.

=== Efficacy ===
A meta-analysis of 53 clinical trials has shown that all triptans are effective for treating migraine at marketed doses and that naratriptan, although less effective than sumatriptan and rizatriptan was more effective than placebo in reducing migraine symptoms at two hours and efficacy was demonstrated in almost two thirds of subjects after four hours of treatment.

== Side effects ==
Side effects are similar to other triptan medications, with the incidence of side effects reportedly being lower than sumatriptan, and side effects occurring rarely except when above 2.5mg. The risk of triptan side effects is also in general low, according to a systematic review. Side effects include: sensations of warmth/heat, dizziness, drowsiness, tingling of the hands or feet, nausea, dry mouth and unsteadiness, chest pain/pressure, throat pain/pressure, unusually fast/slow/irregular pulse, and mental/mood changes. The tingling and heaviness and sensation of warmth/heat is characteristic of selective 5-HT_{1} agonists.

== Pharmacology ==
=== Mechanism of action ===
Naratriptan activities
Target	Affinity (K_{i}, nM)
5-HT_{1A}	15–79 (K_{i}); 302–>10,000 (EC_{50}); 65–79% (E_{max})
5-HT_{1B}	0.47–9.4 (K_{i}); 1.4–25 (EC_{50}); 80–98% (E_{max})
5-HT_{1D}	0.50–5.0 (K_{i}); 0.91–4.4 (EC_{50}); 67–103% (E_{max})
5-HT_{1E}	7.4–20 (K_{i}); 6.8–31 (EC_{50}); 97% (E_{max})
5-HT_{1F}	1.8–43 (K_{i}); 4.2–367 (EC_{50}); 98% (E_{max})
5-HT_{2A}	>10,000 (K_{i}) >10,000 (EC_{50})
5-HT_{2B}	8,320 (K_{i}) >10,000 (EC_{50})
5-HT_{2C}	>3,160 (K_{i}); ND (EC_{50})
5-HT_{3}	>3,160 (mouse)
5-HT_{4}	>3,160 (guinea pig)
5-HT_{5A}	3,390 (rat)
5-HT_{6}	>3,160
5-HT_{7}	1,170–>3,160 (K_{i}) >10,000 (EC_{50})
α_{1A}–α_{1D}	ND
α_{2A}–α_{2C}	ND
β_{1}–β_{3}	ND
D_{1}–D_{5}	ND
H_{1}–H_{4}	ND
M_{1}–M_{5}	ND
I_{1}, I_{2}	ND
σ_{1}, σ_{2}	ND
TAAR1	ND
SERT	ND
NET	ND
DAT	ND
Notes: The smaller the value, the more avidly the drug binds to the site. All proteins are human unless otherwise specified. Refs:

The causes of migraine are not clearly understood; however, the efficacy of naratriptans and other triptans is believed to be due to their activity as 5-HT (serotonin) agonists. The biological and pharmacokinetic profile of naratriptan differs significantly from sumatriptan.

== Chemistry ==
Naratriptan is a triptan and a modified analogue of tryptamines like the psychedelic drug dimethyltryptamine (DMT). However, naratriptan itself is not technically a tryptamine as it features a (1-methylpiperidin-4-yl) side chain instead of the ethylamine side chain present in tryptamines. Besides this difference, naratriptan is substituted at the 5 position of the indole ring system and the amine moiety has been cyclized. Instead of being a tryptamine, naratriptan is a piperidinylindole.

The experimental log P of naratriptan is 1.6 to 2.16 and its predicted log P is 0.28 to 2.16.

== History ==
Naratriptan was patented in 1987 and was introduced for medical use in 1997.

== Society and culture ==
In the United States, the Food and Drug Administration (FDA) approved naratriptan on February 11, 1998. It was covered by U.S. Patent no. 4997841; the FDA lists the patent as expiring on July 7, 2010.

In July 2010, in the wake of the patent expiration, several drug manufacturers, including Roxane Labs, Sandoz and Teva Pharmaceuticals, announced that they were launching generic Naratriptan medications.

The drug continued to be covered by European patent 0303507 in Germany, Spain, France and the United Kingdom through March 10, 2012, and by Australian patent 611469 in Australia through June 17, 2013. It had previously been covered by Canadian patent 1210968; but both Sandoz and Teva (formerly Novopharm) have offered generic equivalents in Canada since that patent's expiration December 1, 2009.

On December 23, 2014, in response to a request from Health Canada, importers in Canada agreed to quarantine the importation of health products, including generic Naratriptan manufactured for both Sandoz and Teva, from Dr. Reddy's Laboratories in Srikakulam, India. Because Teva and Sandoz are the only approved suppliers of generic Naratriptan in Canada, the quarantine resulted in Naratriptan being placed on the Canadian drug shortage list.

Following the Canadian quarantine, the United Arab Emirates' Ministry of Health also imposed a similar quarantine.

== See also ==
- Triptan
- Piperidinylindole
- Substituted tryptamine § Related compounds
