= 1-(2-Naphthyl)piperazine =

Clinical data
- Other names: 2-Naphthylpiperazine; 2-NP; 1-Deazaquipazine
- Drug class: Serotonin receptor modulator; Serotonergic psychedelic; Hallucinogen
- ATC code: None

Identifiers
- IUPAC name: 1-naphthalen-2-ylpiperazine
- CAS Number: 57536-91-1
- PubChem CID: 2760172
- ChemSpider: 2040919
- UNII: VT749H8YJE
- ChEMBL: ChEMBL278509

Chemical and physical data
- Formula: C_{14}H_{16}N_{2}
- Molar mass: 212.296 g·mol^{−1}
- 3D model (JSmol): Interactive image
- SMILES: C1CN(CCN1)C2=CC3=CC=CC=C3C=C2
- InChI: InChI=1S/C14H16N2/c1-2-4-13-11-14(6-5-12(13)3-1)16-9-7-15-8-10-16/h1-6,11,15H,7-10H2; Key:LWLBVIFUVSUSAY-UHFFFAOYSA-N

1-(2-Naphthyl)piperazine (2-NP), also known as 1-deazaquipazine, is a serotonin receptor modulator and putative serotonergic psychedelic of the arylpiperazine family related to quipazine.

It shows affinity for the serotonin 5-HT_{1}, 5-HT_{2}, and 5-HT_{3} receptors and is known to act as a serotonin 5-HT_{2A} receptor partial agonist. Conversely, it has negligible affinity for the serotonin 5-HT_{1D} receptor. The drug produces the head-twitch response, a behavioral proxy of psychedelic effects, in rodents, although it was less efficacious than quipazine. This effect was absent in serotonin 5-HT_{2A} receptor knockout mice. In addition, 2-NP fully generalizes to the psychedelic DOM in animal drug discrimination tests. Hence, it may have hallucinogenic effects in humans.

Along with quipazine, the drug is one of a relatively small number of known psychedelics that is distinct from the tryptamine, phenethylamine, and lysergamide families. It was first described in the scientific literature by at least 1961.

== See also ==
- Substituted piperazine
- Substituted naphthylethylamine
- 1-(1-Naphthyl)piperazine (1-NP)
- CPQ
- VCU-1012 (3-azaquipazine)
