= RS134-49 =

Chemical compound

Clinical data
- Other names: 4-Methyl-3-THPI
- Drug class: Serotonin receptor modulator; Serotonin 5-HT_{2A} receptor agonist

Identifiers
- IUPAC name: 4-methyl-3-(1,2,3,6-tetrahydropyridin-5-yl)-1H-indole
- CAS Number: 2945139-94-4
- PubChem CID: 168941768

Chemical and physical data
- Formula: C_{14}H_{16}N_{2}
- Molar mass: 212.296 g·mol^{−1}
- 3D model (JSmol): Interactive image
- SMILES: CC1=C2C(=CC=C1)NC=C2C3=CCCNC3
- InChI: InChI=1S/C14H16N2/c1-10-4-2-6-13-14(10)12(9-16-13)11-5-3-7-15-8-11/h2,4-6,9,15-16H,3,7-8H2,1H3; Key:UIZDBLDTIJHWHC-UHFFFAOYSA-N

RS134-49 is a tetrahydropyridinylindole (THPI) derivative related to psychedelic tryptamines which acts as a 5-HT_{2A} receptor agonist, with a 5-HT_{2A} K_{i} of 11.5nM and an EC_{50} of 22nM. It is a biased agonist selective for activation of the G_{q} coupled signalling pathway with weaker activation of the β-arrestin 2 coupled pathway, but shows a more balanced profile than related compounds such as (R)-69.

== See also ==
- Cyclized tryptamine
- Tetrahydropyridinylindole
- RU-28253
- 4-Methyl-AMT
- 4-Methyl-AET
- 4-Methyl-DMT
- CP-94253
- RU-24969
- SN-22
- VU6067416
