= Naphthylpiperazine =

Naphthylpiperazine (NP) may refer to:

- 1-(1-Naphthyl)piperazine (1-NP)
- 1-(2-Naphthyl)piperazine (2-NP)
