= Sertindole =

Antipsychotic medication

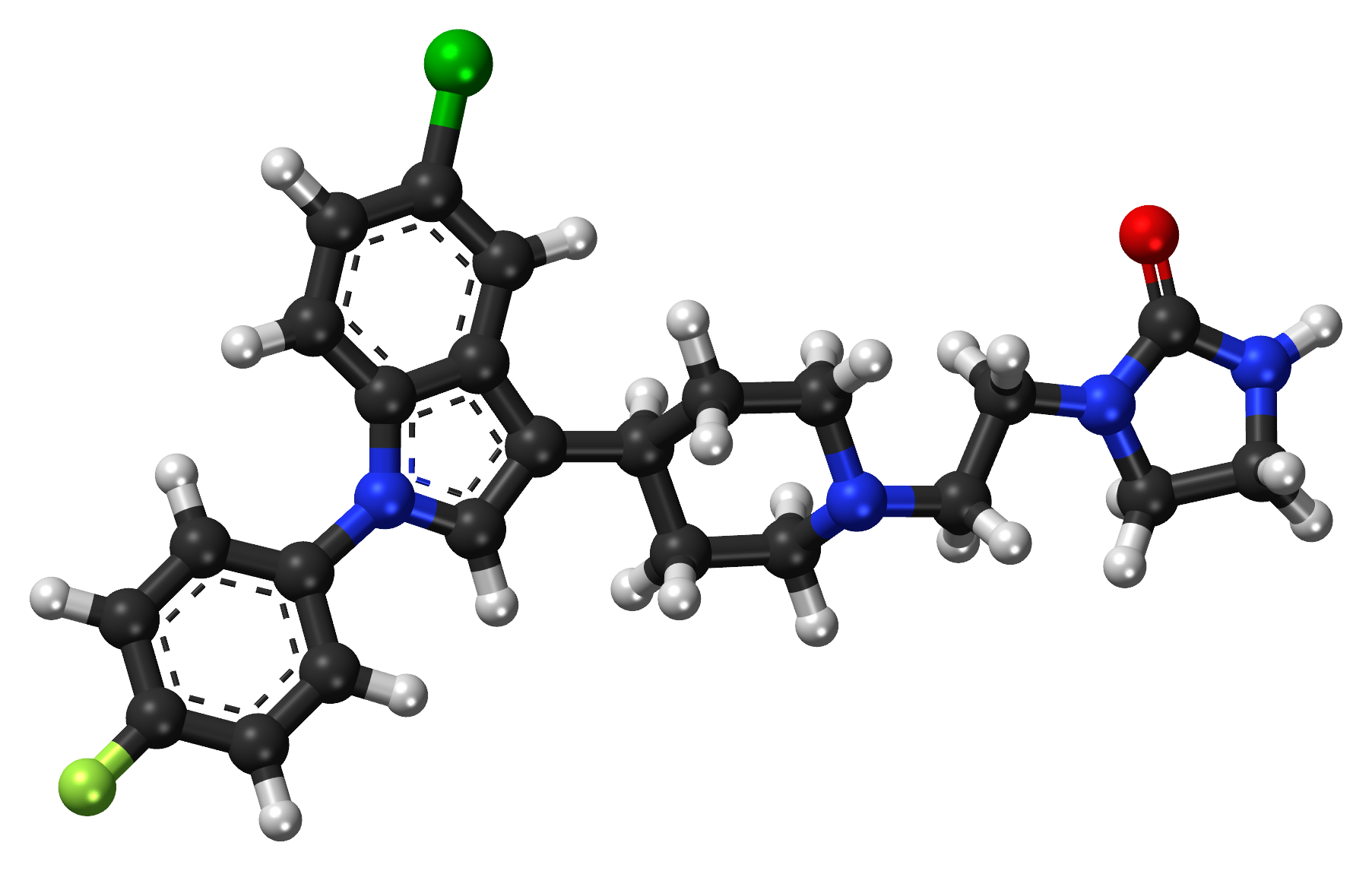

Clinical data
- Trade names: Serdolect, others
- AHFS/Drugs.com: International Drug Names
- Pregnancy category: AU: C
- Routes of administration: Oral
- Drug class: Atypical antipsychotic
- ATC code: N05AE03 (WHO)

Legal status
- Legal status: AU: S4 (Prescription only); In general: ℞ (Prescription only)

Pharmacokinetic data
- Bioavailability: 75%
- Protein binding: 99.5%
- Metabolism: Liver (mostly via CYP2D6 and CYP3A4)
- Elimination half-life: 3 days
- Excretion: Faecal (the majority), Kidney (4% metabolites; 1% unchanged)

Identifiers
- IUPAC name: 1-[2-[4-[5-chloro-1-(4-fluorophenyl)-indol-3-yl]-1-piperidyl]ethyl]imidazolidin-2-one
- CAS Number: 106516-24-9
- PubChem CID: 60149
- IUPHAR/BPS: 98
- DrugBank: DB06144
- ChemSpider: 54229
- UNII: GVV4Z879SP
- KEGG: D00561
- ChEBI: CHEBI:9122
- ChEMBL: ChEMBL12713
- CompTox Dashboard (EPA): DTXSID6048967
- ECHA InfoCard: 100.162.562

Chemical and physical data
- Formula: C_{24}H_{26}ClFN_{4}O
- Molar mass: 440.95 g·mol^{−1}
- 3D model (JSmol): Interactive image
- SMILES: Fc1ccc(cc1)n3c2ccc(Cl)cc2c(c3)C5CCN(CCN4C(=O)NCC4)CC5
- InChI: InChI=1S/C24H26ClFN4O/c25-18-1-6-23-21(15-18)22(16-30(23)20-4-2-19(26)3-5-20)17-7-10-28(11-8-17)13-14-29-12-9-27-24(29)31/h1-6,15-17H,7-14H2,(H,27,31); Key:GZKLJWGUPQBVJQ-UHFFFAOYSA-N

Sertindole, sold under the brand name Serdolect among others, is an antipsychotic medication. Sertindole was developed by the Danish pharmaceutical company Lundbeck and marketed under license by Abbott Labs. Like other atypical antipsychotics, it has activity at dopamine and serotonin receptors in the brain. It is used in the treatment of schizophrenia.

Sertindole is not approved for use in the United States and was discontinued in Australia in January 2014.

== Medical uses ==
Sertindole appears effective as an antipsychotic in schizophrenia. In a 2013 study in a comparison of 15 antipsychotic drugs in effectivity in treating schizophrenic symptoms, sertindole was found to be slightly less effective than haloperidol, quetiapine, and aripiprazole, as effective as ziprasidone, approximately as effective as chlorpromazine and asenapine, and slightly more effective than lurasidone and iloperidone.

== Adverse effects ==
Very common (>10% incidence) adverse effects include:

- Headache
- Ejaculation failure
- Insomnia
- Dizziness

Common (1–10% incidence) adverse effects include:

- Urine that tests positive for red and/or white blood cells
- Sedation (causes less sedation than most antipsychotic drugs according to a recent meta-analysis of the efficacy and tolerability of 15 antipsychotic drugs. Causes only slightly [and non-significantly] more sedation than amisulpride and paliperidone)
- Ejaculation disorder
- Erectile dysfunction
- Orthostatic hypotension
- Weight gain (which it seems to possess a similar propensity for causing as quetiapine)

Uncommon (0.1–1% incidence) adverse effects include:

- Substernal chest pain
- Face oedema
- Influenza-like illness
- Neck rigidity
- Pallor
- Peripheral vascular disorder
- syncope
- Torsades de pointes
- Vasodilation
- Suicide attempt
- Amnesia
- Anxiety
- Ataxia
- Confusion
- Incoordination
- Libido decreased
- Libido increased
- Miosis
- Nystagmus
- Personality disorder
- Psychosis
- Reflexes decreased
- Reflexes increased
- Stupor
- Suicidal tendency
- Urinary retention
- Vertigo
- Diabetes mellitus
- Abnormal stools
- Gastritis
- Gingivitis
- Glossitis
- Increased appetite
- Mouth ulceration
- Rectal disorder
- Rectal haemorrhage
- Stomatitis
- Tongue disorder
- Ulcerative stomatitis
- Anaemia
- Ecchymosis
- Hypochromic anaemia
- Leukopenia
- Hyperglycaemia
- Hyperlipemia
- Oedema
- Bone pain
- Myasthenia
- Twitching
- Bronchitis
- Hyperventilation
- Pneumonia
- Sinusitis
- Furunculosis
- Herpes simplex
- Nail disorder
- Psoriasis
- Pustular Rash
- Skin discolouration
- Skin hypertrophy
- Skin ulcer
- Abnormal vision
- Keratoconjunctivitis
- Lacrimation disorder
- Otitis externa
- Pupillary disorder
- Taste perversion
- Anorgasmia
- Penis disorder (gs)
- Urinary urgency
- Hyperprolactinaemia (which it seems to cause with a higher propensity than most other atypical antipsychotics do)
- Seizures
- Galactorrhoea

Rare (<0.1% incidence) adverse effects include:

- Neuroleptic malignant syndrome
- Tardive dyskinesia

Unknown frequency adverse events include:

- Extrapyramidal side effects (EPSE; e.g. dystonia, akathisia, muscle rigidity, parkinsonism, etc. These adverse effects are probably uncommon/rare according to a recent meta-analysis of the efficacy and tolerability of 15 antipsychotic drugs which found it had the 2nd lowest effect size for causing EPSE)
- Venous thromboembolism
- QT interval prolongation (probably common; in a recent meta-analysis of the efficacy and tolerability of 15 antipsychotic drugs it was found to be the most prone to causing QT interval prolongation)

== Pharmacology ==
| Biologic protein | Binding affinity (K_{i}[nM]) | Notes |
|---|---|---|
| 5-HT_{1A} | 280 | |
| 5-HT_{1B} | 60 | |
| 5-HT_{1D} | 96 | |
| 5-HT_{1E} | 430 | |
| 5-HT_{1F} | 360 | |
| 5-HT_{2A} | 0.39 | The receptor believed to mediate the atypicality of atypical antipsychotics. |
| 5-HT_{2C} | 0.9 | Likely responsible for its propensity for causing weight gain. |
| 5-HT_{6} | 5.4 | |
| 5-HT_{7} | 28 | |
| α_{1A} | 1.8 | Likely responsible for the orthostatic hypotension seen in patients on sertindole. |
| α_{2A} | 640 | |
| α_{2B} | 450 | |
| α_{2C} | 450 | |
| β_{1} | 5000 | |
| β_{2} | 5000 | |
| M_{1} | >10000 | |
| M_{3} | 2692 | |
| D_{2} | 2.35 | Believed to be responsible for the drug's efficacy against positive symptoms. |
| D_{3} | 2.30 | |
| D_{4} | 4.92 | |
| hERG | 3 | Responsible for the QT interval prolongation and torsade de pointes |
| H_{1} | 130 | |
| NK_{1} | 1000 | |

Sertindole is metabolized in the body to dehydrosertindole. Sertindole has also been reported to interact with tubulin and inhibit its polymerization.

== Chemistry ==
In terms of chemical structure, sertindole is a piperidinylindole.

== Safety and status ==
=== United States ===
Abbott Labs first applied for US Food and Drug Administration (FDA) approval for sertindole in 1996, but withdrew this application in 1998 following concerns over the increased risk of sudden death from QTc prolongation. In a trial of 2000 patients on taking sertindole, 27 patients died unexpectedly, including 13 sudden deaths. Lundbeck cites the results of the Sertindole Cohort Prospective (SCoP) study of 10,000 patients to support its claim that although sertindole does increase the QTc interval, this is not associated with increased rates of cardiac arrhythmias, and that patients on sertindole had the same overall mortality rate as those on risperidone. Nevertheless, in April 2009, an FDA advisory panel voted 13-0 that sertindole was effective in the treatment of schizophrenia but 12-1 that it had not been shown to be acceptably safe. As of October 2010, the drug has not been approved by the FDA.

=== European Union ===
In the European Union, sertindole was approved and marketed in 19 member states from 1996, but its marketing authorization was suspended by the European Medicines Agency (EMA) in 1998 and the drug was withdrawn from the market. In 2002, based on new data, the EMA's Committee for Medicinal Products for Human Use (CHMP) suggested that Sertindole could be reintroduced for restricted use in clinical trials, with strong safeguards including extensive contraindications and warnings for patients at risk of cardiac dysrhythmias, a recommended reduction in maximum dose from 24 mg to 20 mg in all but exceptional cases, and extensive ECG monitoring requirement before and during treatment. As of September 2020, sertindole is authorized in several member states of the European Union.

== See also ==
- Piperidinylindole
