= RU-24969 =

Chemical compound

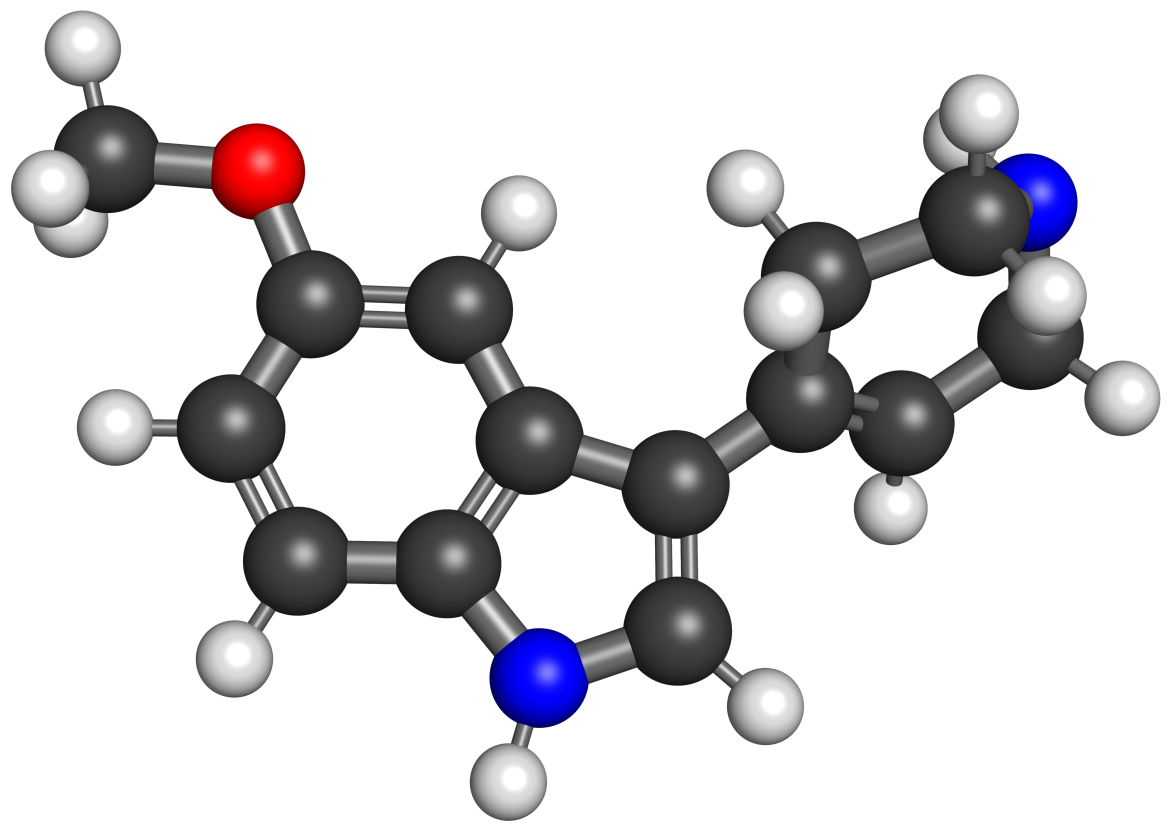

Clinical data
- Other names: RU-24969; RU24969; 5-MeO-THPI; 5-Methoxy-3-(1,2,3,6-tetrahydropyridin-4-yl)indole; 5-Methoxy-3-(1,2,5,6-tetrahydro-4-pyridinyl)-1H-indole
- Drug class: Serotonin 5-HT_{1B} and 5-HT_{A} receptor agonist

Identifiers
- IUPAC name: 5-Methoxy-3-(1,2,5,6-tetrahydro-4-pyridinyl)-1H-indole
- CAS Number: 107008-28-6
- PubChem CID: 108029
- IUPHAR/BPS: 23
- ChemSpider: 97138
- UNII: RKG24J8KJR
- CompTox Dashboard (EPA): DTXSID40276045

Chemical and physical data
- Formula: C_{14}H_{16}N_{2}O
- Molar mass: 228.295 g·mol^{−1}
- 3D model (JSmol): Interactive image
- SMILES: c3cc(OC)cc1c3[nH]cc1C=2CCNCC=2
- InChI: InChI=1S/C14H16N2O/c1-17-11-2-3-14-12(8-11)13(9-16-14)10-4-6-15-7-5-10/h2-4,8-9,15-16H,5-7H2,1H3; Key:KRVMLPUDAOWOGN-UHFFFAOYSA-N

RU-24969, also known as 5-methoxy-3-(1,2,3,6-tetrahydropyridin-4-yl)indole (5-MeO-THPI), is a serotonin receptor modulator of the tetrahydropyridinylindole group related to 5-MeO-DMT which is used in scientific research.

== Pharmacology ==
=== Pharmacodynamics ===
RU-24969 is a selective agonist of the serotonin 5-HT_{1A} and 5-HT_{1B} receptors, with 5-fold preference for the latter receptor over the former. In studies, its affinities (K_{i}) were 2 nM for the serotonin 5-HT_{1} receptor, 5 nM for the serotonin 5-HT_{1A} receptor, 4 nM for the serotonin 5-HT_{1B} receptor, 780 to 1,000 nM for the serotonin 5-HT_{2} receptor, and 400 nM for the serotonin 5-HT_{2C} receptor. It also has affinity for the serotonin 5-HT_{5A}, 5-HT_{5B}, and 5-HT_{7} receptors.

The drug produces MDMA-like locomotor hyperactivity in animals and this is thought to be mediated by activation of both serotonin 5-HT_{1A} and 5-HT_{1B} receptors. As with other serotonin 5-HT_{1B} receptor agonists such as CP-94253, RU-24969 has also been found to increase the reinforcing properties of cocaine in animals, suggesting a role for serotonin 5-HT_{1B} receptors in cocaine addiction as well. The drug produces antiaggressive effects in rodents. It did not increase oxytocin levels in rodents.

== Chemistry ==
Many analogues of RU-24969 have been studied and described.

== History ==
RU-24969 was first described in the scientific literature by 1980.

== See also ==
- Serotonin 5-HT_{1B} receptor agonist
- Tetrahydropyridinylindole
- Substituted tryptamine § Related compounds
- EMD-386088
- RS134-49
- RU-28253
- RU-28306
- SN-22
