= 5-HT1F receptor =

Protein-coding gene in the species Homo sapiens

HTR1F

Identifiers
- Aliases: HTR1F, 5-HT-1F, 5-HT1F, 5HT6, HTR1EL, MR77, 5-HT1F receptor, 5-hydroxytryptamine receptor 1F
- External IDs: OMIM: 182134; MGI: 99842; GeneCards: HTR1F

Gene location (Human)
Chr.	Chromosome 3 (human)
Band	3p11.2-p11.1	Start	87,792,706 bp
Band	3p11.2-p11.1	End	87,993,839 bp

Gene location (Mouse)
Chr.	Chromosome 16 (mouse)
Band	16 C1.3|16 37.1 cM	Start	64,745,092 bp
Band	16 C1.3|16 37.1 cM	End	64,926,217 bp
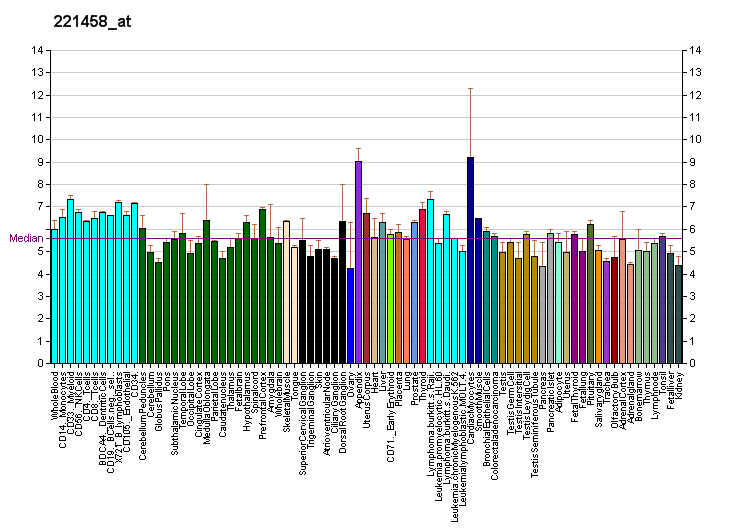
RNA expression pattern
Bgee	Human / Mouse (ortholog); Top expressed in: testicle; islet of Langerhans; Achilles tendon; gonad; prefrontal cortex; smooth muscle tissue; subcutaneous adipose tissue; primary visual cortex; cervix; mononuclear cell / Top expressed in: lumbar spinal ganglion; paraventricular nucleus of thalamus; ventral nucleus of lateral geniculate body; subthalamus; ventral nuclear group; multiform layer of neocortex; lateral preoptic nucleus; ventral lateral nucleus; internal pyramidal layer of neocortex; thalamic reticular nucleus; More reference expression data
BioGPS	More reference expression data
Gene ontology
Molecular function	G protein-coupled receptor activity; signal transducer activity; serotonin binding; G protein-coupled serotonin receptor activity; neurotransmitter receptor activity
Cellular component	integral component of membrane; plasma membrane; integral component of plasma membrane; membrane; dendrite
Biological process	G protein-coupled receptor signaling pathway, coupled to cyclic nucleotide second messenger; adenylate cyclase-inhibiting G protein-coupled receptor signaling pathway; signal transduction; chemical synaptic transmission; G protein-coupled serotonin receptor signaling pathway; G protein-coupled receptor signaling pathway
Sources:Amigo / QuickGO
Orthologs
Databases	NCBI: entry; OMA: entry
Species	Human	Mouse
Entrez	3355	15557
Ensembl	ENSG00000179097	ENSMUSG00000050783
UniProt	P30939	Q02284
RefSeq (mRNA)	NM_000866; NM_001322208; NM_001322209; NM_001322210	NM_008310
RefSeq (protein)	NP_000857; NP_001309137; NP_001309138; NP_001309139	NP_032336
Location (UCSC)	Chr 3: 87.79 – 87.99 Mb	Chr 16: 64.75 – 64.93 Mb
PubMed search
- Wikidata
View/Edit Human	View/Edit Mouse

5-hydroxytryptamine (serotonin) receptor 1F, also known as HTR1F, is a 5-HT_{1} receptor protein and also denotes the human gene encoding it.

== Agonists ==
- 5-n-Butyryloxy-DMT: >60-fold selectivity versus 5-HT_{1E} receptor
- BRL-54443 - mixed 5-HT_{1E/1F} agonist
- Eletriptan - mixed 5-HT_{1B/1D/1E/1F/2B/7} agonist
- LY-334,370 - as well as related benzamides
- LY-344,864 (N-[(3R)-3-(Dimethylamino)-2,3,4,9-tetrahydro-1H-carbazol-6-yl]-4-fluorobenzamide)
- Naratriptan - mixed 5-HT_{1B/1D/1F} agonist
- Lasmiditan - selective 5-HT_{1F} agonist, a first-in-class ditan molecule

== Antagonists ==
MLS000756415

== See also ==
- 5-HT_{1} receptor
- 5-HT receptor
