= XC-130 =

Clinical data
- Other names: XC130; XC130-A10H
- Routes of administration: Oral
- Drug class: Dopamine receptor agonist; Antiparkinsonian agent

XC-130, or XC130, also known as XC130-A10H, is a dopamine receptor agonist which is under development for the treatment of Parkinson's disease. It is taken orally.

The drug is a dopamine D_{2} receptor partial agonist, a dopamine D_{3} receptor antagonist, an α_{1A}-adrenergic receptor antagonist, and a serotonin 5-HT_{1B}, 5-HT_{2A}, and 5-HT_{2B} receptor antagonist. Its potency as a dopamine D_{2} receptor agonist is similar to that of lisuride. XC-130 produces antiparkinsonian-like effects in animals. Due to its pharmacological profile, the drug is expected to avoid adverse effects and toxicity such as obsessive–compulsive symptoms (related to D_{3} agonism), vasoconstriction (related to α_{1A}-adrenergic and 5-HT_{1B} agonism), hallucinogenic effects (related to 5-HT_{2A} agonism), and cardiac valvulopathy (related to 5-HT_{2B} agonism). It has a notably longer elimination half-life than the relatively short-acting lisuride. The drug is intended to provide similar therapy as existing ergoline dopamine receptor agonists like pergolide and lisuride but with an improved drug profile.

XC-130 is under development by Xoc Pharmaceuticals. As of November 2022, it is in phase 1/2 clinical trials. The chemical structure of XC-130 does not yet appear to have been disclosed.

== See also ==
- List of investigational Parkinson's disease drugs
- XC-101-D13H (XC-101)
