= XC-101 =

Clinical data
- Other names: XC101; XC101-D13H; XC-101-D13H
- Routes of administration: Oral
- Drug class: Serotonin 5-HT_{1A}, 5-HT_{1B}, 5-HT_{1D}, 5-HT_{1F}, and 5-HT_{7} receptor agonist; Serotonin 5-HT_{2A}, 5-HT_{2B}, and 5-HT_{2C} receptor antagonist; Antimigraine agent

Pharmacokinetic data
- Onset of action: 2–3 hours (T_{max})
- Elimination half-life: 10–15 hours

XC-101, or XC101, also known as XC101-D13H, is a non-selective serotonin receptor modulator which is under development for the prevention of migraine. It is taken orally.

The drug acts as an agonist of the serotonin 5-HT_{1A}, 5-HT_{1B}, 5-HT_{1D}, 5-HT_{1F}, and 5-HT_{7} receptors and as an antagonist of the serotonin 5-HT_{2A}, 5-HT_{2B}, and 5-HT_{2C} receptors, with varying potencies at these targets. Its antimigraine preventative efficacy is thought to derive specifically from its serotonin 5-HT_{2B} and 5-HT_{2C} receptor antagonism, although its serotonin 5-HT_{1D} and 5-HT_{1B} receptor agonism may also contribute. Due to its lack of agonism at the serotonin 5-HT_{2A} and 5-HT_{2B} receptors and at the α_{1A}-adrenergic receptor, XC-101 is thought to avoid adverse effects and toxicity including hallucinogenic effects, cardiac fibrosis and valvulopathy, and vasoconstriction. The pharmacokinetics and tolerability of XC-101 at doses of 0.2 to 0.5 mg orally in humans have been studied.

Besides XC-101, its developer has also studied ergoline antimigraine agents like methysergide. XC-101 has been compared to methysergide, which was described as being effective for migraine prevention but as having serious side effects due to undesirable off-target activities. Whereas methysergide is functionally an agonist of the serotonin 5-HT_{2B} receptor due to its active metabolite methylergometrine, XC-101 is a silent antagonist of the receptor. In addition, whereas methysergide was found to be a full agonist of the serotonin 5-HT_{2A} receptor, which is associated with psychedelic effects, XC-101 was likewise a silent antagonist of the receptor.

XC-101 was first described in the scientific literature by 2019. It is under development by Xoc Pharmaceuticals. As of November 2022, the drug is in phase 1/2 clinical trials for migraine prevention. The chemical structure of XC-101 does not yet appear to have been disclosed. However, Xoc Pharmaceuticals patented an ergoline antimigraine compound with code name "D13H" in 2019 and this compound may be XC101-D13H (XC-101). It is the 2-cyclopropyl and 9,10-dihydro analogue of methysergide (or 2-cyclopropyl-9,10-dihydromethysergide).

== See also ==
- Substituted lysergamide
- List of investigational headache and migraine drugs
- Prevention of migraine attacks
- XC130-A10H (XC-130)
