= ATC code G02 =

ATC code G02 Other gynecologicals is a therapeutic subgroup of the Anatomical Therapeutic Chemical Classification System, a system of alphanumeric codes developed by the World Health Organization (WHO) for the classification of drugs and other medical products. Subgroup G02 is part of the anatomical group G Genito-urinary system and sex hormones.

Codes for veterinary use (ATCvet codes) can be created by placing the letter Q in front of the human ATC code: for example, QG02. ATCvet codes without corresponding human ATC codes are cited with the leading Q in the following list.
National versions of the ATC classification may include additional codes not present in this list, which follows the WHO version.

== G02A Uterotonics ==
=== G02AB Ergot alkaloids ===
G02AB01 Methylergometrine
G02AB02 Ergot alkaloids
G02AB03 Ergometrine
QG02AB53 Ergometrine, combinations

=== G02AC Ergot alkaloids and oxytocin including analogues, in combination ===
G02AC01 Methylergometrine and oxytocin
QG02AC90 Ergometrine and oxytocin

=== G02AD Prostaglandins ===
G02AD01 Dinoprost
G02AD02 Dinoprostone
G02AD03 Gemeprost
G02AD04 Carboprost
G02AD05 Sulprostone
G02AD06 Misoprostol
QG02AD90 Cloprostenol
QG02AD91 Luprostiol
QG02AD92 Fenprostalene
QG02AD93 Tiaprost
QG02AD94 Alfaprostol
QG02AD95 Etiproston

== G02B Contraceptives for topical use ==
=== G02BA Intrauterine contraceptives ===
G02BA01 Plastic IUD
G02BA02 Plastic IUD with copper
G02BA03 Plastic IUD with progestogen

=== G02BB Intravaginal contraceptives ===
G02BB01 Vaginal ring with progestogen and estrogen
G02BB02 Vaginal ring with progestogen

== G02C Other gynecologicals ==
=== G02CA Sympathomimetics, labour repressants ===
G02CA01 Ritodrine
G02CA02 Buphenine
G02CA03 Fenoterol
QG02CA90 Vetrabutin
QG02CA91 Clenbuterol

=== G02CB Prolactin inhibitors ===
G02CB01 Bromocriptine
G02CB02 Lisuride
G02CB03 Cabergoline
G02CB04 Quinagolide
G02CB05 Metergoline
G02CB06 Terguride

=== G02CC Anti-inflammatory products for vaginal administration ===
G02CC01 Ibuprofen
G02CC02 Naproxen
G02CC03 Benzydamine
G02CC04 Flunoxaprofen

=== G02CX Other gynecologicals ===
G02CX01 Atosiban
G02CX02 Flibanserin
G02CX03 Agni casti fructus
G02CX04 Cimicifugae rhizoma
G02CX05 Bremelanotide
G02CX06 Fezolinetant
G02CX07 Elinzanetant
QG02CX90 Denaverine
QG02CX91 Lotrifen
