= Terguride =

Chemical compound

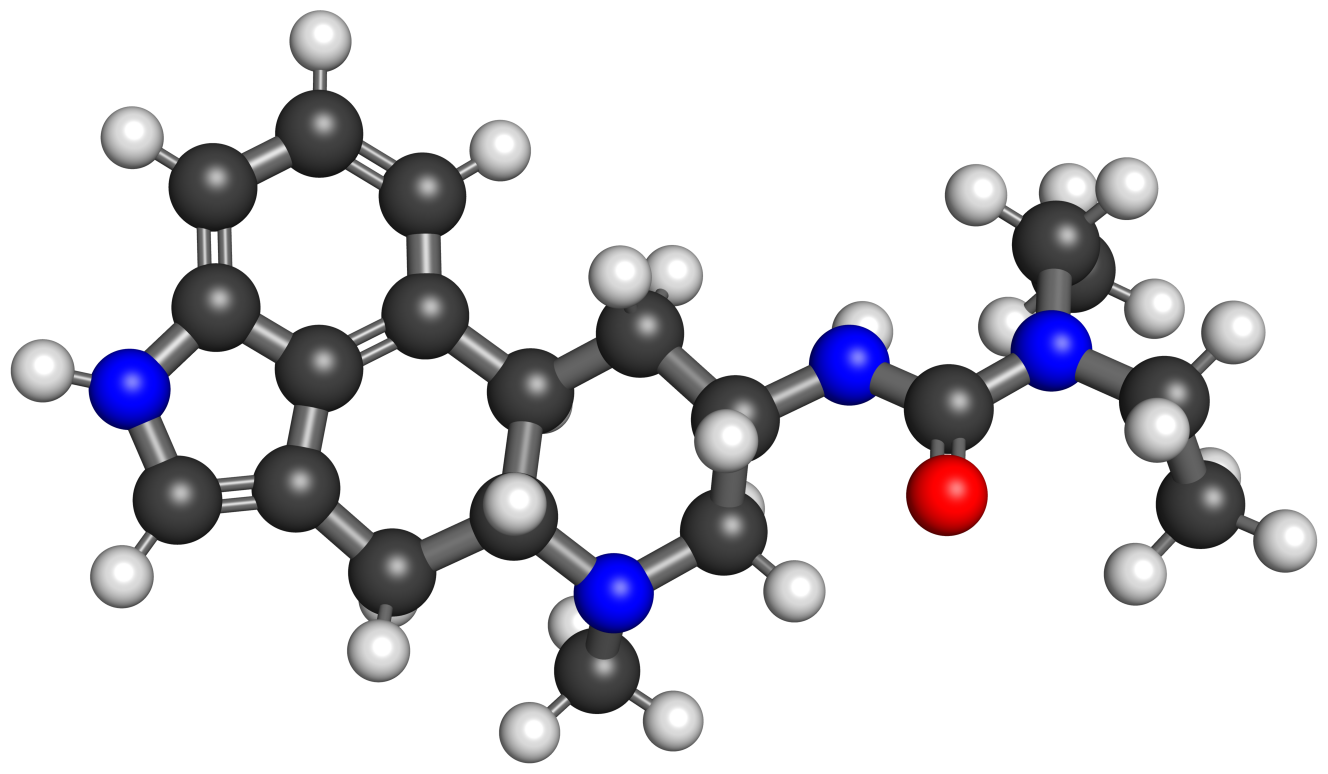

Clinical data
- Trade names: Teluron
- Other names: Dironyl; Mysalfon; trans-Dihydrolisuride; Transdihydrolisuride; TDHL; SH-406; VUFB-6638; ZK-31224; N,N-Diethyl-N'-[(8α)-6-methylergolin-8-yl]urea
- AHFS/Drugs.com: International Drug Names
- Routes of administration: Oral
- ATC code: G02CB06 (WHO)

Legal status
- Legal status: In general: ℞ (Prescription only)

Identifiers
- IUPAC name: 3-[(6aR,9S,10aR)-7-methyl-6,6a,8,9,10,10a-hexahydro-4H-indolo[4,3-fg]quinolin-9-yl]-1,1-diethylurea
- CAS Number: 37686-84-3
- PubChem CID: 443951
- IUPHAR/BPS: 56
- DrugBank: DB13399
- ChemSpider: 392004
- UNII: 21OJT43Q88
- KEGG: D01348
- CompTox Dashboard (EPA): DTXSID3045809
- ECHA InfoCard: 100.048.732

Chemical and physical data
- Formula: C_{20}H_{28}N_{4}O
- Molar mass: 340.471 g·mol^{−1}
- 3D model (JSmol): Interactive image
- SMILES: CCN(CC)C(=O)N[C@H]1C[C@H]2[C@@H](CC3=CNC4=CC=CC2=C34)N(C1)C
- InChI: InChI=1S/C20H28N4O/c1-4-24(5-2)20(25)22-14-10-16-15-7-6-8-17-19(15)13(11-21-17)9-18(16)23(3)12-14/h6-8,11,14,16,18,21H,4-5,9-10,12H2,1-3H3,(H,22,25)/t14-,16+,18+/m0/s1; Key:JOAHPSVPXZTVEP-YXJHDRRASA-N

Terguride (INN, JAN), sold under the brand name Teluron, is a serotonin receptor antagonist and dopamine receptor agonist of the ergoline family. It is approved for and used as a prolactin inhibitor in the treatment of hyperprolactinemia (high prolactin levels) in Japan. Terguride is taken by mouth.

== Pharmacology ==
=== Pharmacodynamics ===
Terguride acts as an agonist of the dopamine D_{2} receptor and as an antagonist of the serotonin 5-HT_{2A} and 5-HT_{2B} receptors, among other actions.

As an antagonist of the 5-HT_{2B} receptor, terguride is not associated with cardiac valvulopathy.

Activities of terguride at various sites
Site	Affinity (K_{i} [nM])	Efficacy (E_{max} [%])	Action
D_{1}	28	?	?
D_{2S}	0.81	39	Partial agonist
D_{2L}	1.1	0	Silent antagonist
D_{3}	1.0	36	Partial agonist
D_{4}	8.1	0	Silent antagonist
D_{5}	23	?	?
5-HT_{1A}	3.5	71	Partial agonist
5-HT_{1B}	257	37	Partial agonist
5-HT_{1D}	16	62	Partial agonist
5-HT_{2A}	4.8	49	Partial agonist
5-HT_{2B}	7.1	0	Silent antagonist
5-HT_{2C}	48	0	Silent antagonist
5-HT_{7}	8–42	?	?
α_{1A}	3.5	0	Silent antagonist
α_{1B}	35	?	?
α_{1D}	3.9	?	?
α_{2A}	0.30	0	Silent antagonist
α_{2B}	0.45	0	Silent antagonist
α_{2C}	0.76	0	Silent antagonist
α_{2D}	1.5	?	?
β_{1}	661	?	?
β_{2}	20	?	?
H_{1}	339	?	?
M_{1}	>10,000	?	?
Notes: All receptors are human except α_{2D}-adrenergic, which is rat (no human counterpart), and 5-HT_{7}, which was guinea pig.

== Research ==
Serotonin stimulates the proliferation of pulmonary artery smooth muscle cells, and induces fibrosis in the wall of pulmonary arteries. Together, this causes vascular remodeling and narrowing of the pulmonary arteries. These changes result in increased vascular resistance and PAH. Due to the potential anti-proliferative and anti-fibrotic activity of terguride, this potential medicine could offer the hope of achieving reversal of pulmonary artery vascular remodeling and attenuation of disease progression. In May 2008, terguride was granted orphan drug status for the treatment of pulmonary arterial hypertension. In May 2010 Pfizer purchased worldwide rights for the drug. However, development was discontinued in 2011.

== See also ==
- List of investigational Parkinson's disease drugs
- Lisuride
- Proterguride
