= Pergolide =

Dopamine agonist medication

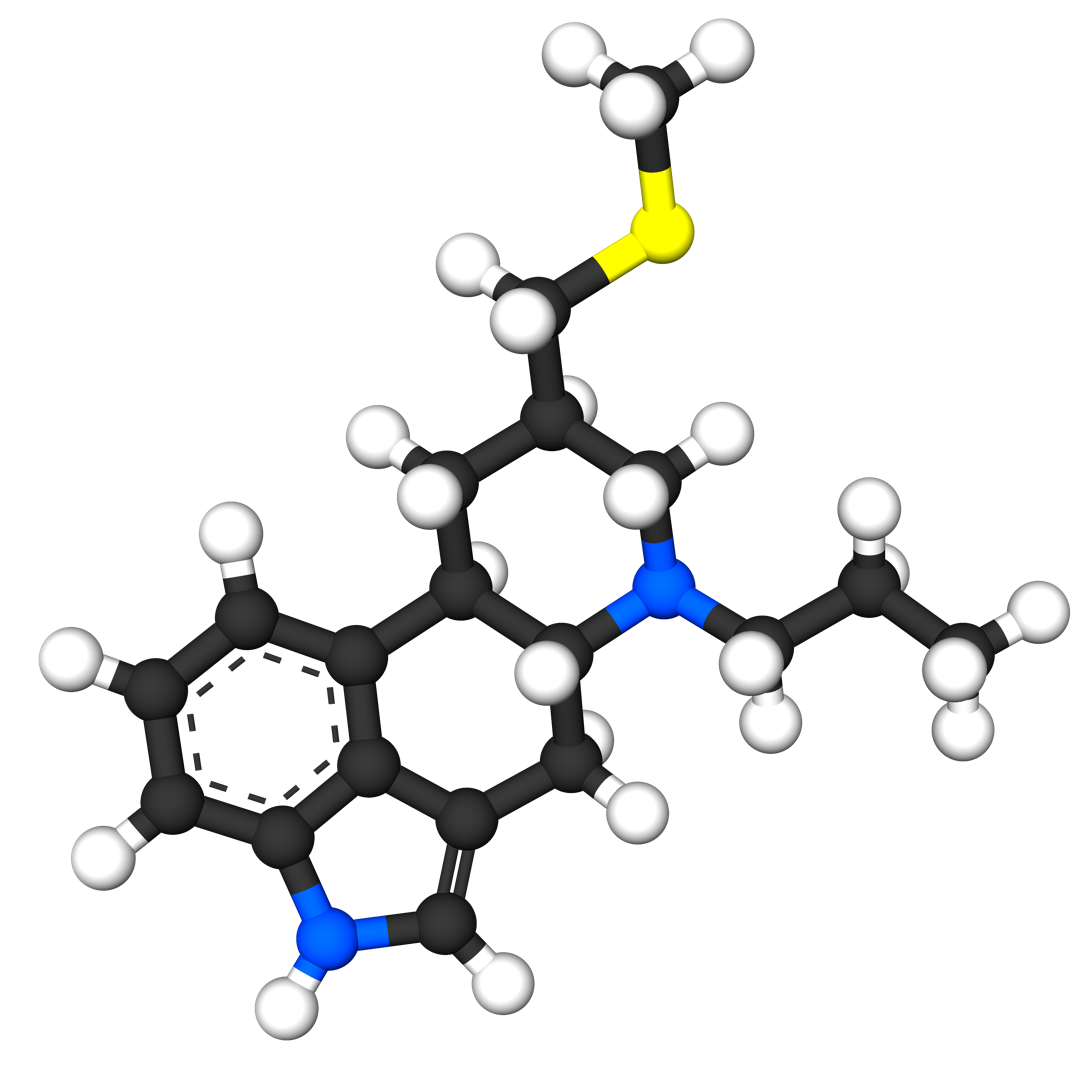

Clinical data
- Trade names: Permax, Prascend (veterinary), others
- Other names: 8β-[(Methylthio)methyl]-6-propylergoline; 8b-[(Methylsulfanyl)methyl]-6-propylergoline
- AHFS/Drugs.com: Monograph
- Pregnancy category: B
- Routes of administration: Oral
- Drug class: Dopamine receptor agonist; Serotonin receptor agonist; Antiparkinsonian agent
- ATC code: N04BC02 (WHO)

Legal status
- Legal status: BR: Class C1 (Other controlled substances); CA: ℞-only; US: Veterinary use only, withdrawn for human use

Pharmacokinetic data
- Protein binding: 90%
- Metabolism: Extensively hepatic
- Elimination half-life: 27 hours

Identifiers
- IUPAC name: (6aR,9R,10aR)-9-(methylthiomethyl)-7-propyl-4,6,6a,7,8,9,10,10a-octahydroindolo[4,3-fg]quinoline
- CAS Number: 66104-22-1
- PubChem CID: 47811
- IUPHAR/BPS: 48
- DrugBank: DB01186
- ChemSpider: 43503
- UNII: 24MJ822NZ9
- KEGG: D08339
- ChEBI: CHEBI:63617
- ChEMBL: ChEMBL531
- CompTox Dashboard (EPA): DTXSID2023438
- ECHA InfoCard: 100.241.322

Chemical and physical data
- Formula: C_{19}H_{26}N_{2}S
- Molar mass: 314.49 g·mol^{−1}
- 3D model (JSmol): Interactive image
- SMILES: [H][C@]12C[C@@H](CSC)CN(CCC)[C@]1([H])Cc3c[nH]c4cccc2c34
- InChI: InChI=1S/C19H26N2S/c1-3-7-21-11-13(12-22-2)8-16-15-5-4-6-17-19(15)14(10-20-17)9-18(16)21/h4-6,10,13,16,18,20H,3,7-9,11-12H2,1-2H3/t13-,16-,18-/m1/s1; Key:YEHCICAEULNIGD-MZMPZRCHSA-N

Pergolide, sold under the brand name Permax and Prascend (veterinary) among others, is an ergoline-based dopamine receptor agonist used in some countries for the treatment of Parkinson's disease. Parkinson's disease is associated with reduced dopamine synthesis in the substantia nigra of the brain. Pergolide acts on many of the same receptors as dopamine to increase receptor activity.

It was patented in 1978 and approved for medical use in 1989. In 2007, pergolide was withdrawn from the U.S. market for human use after several published studies revealed a link between the drug and increased rates of valvular heart disease. However, a veterinary form of pergolide, marketed under the trade name Prascend, is permitted for the treatment of pituitary pars intermedia dysfunction (PPID) also known as equine Cushing's syndrome (ECS) in horses.

== Medical uses ==
Pergolide is no longer available for use by humans in the United States, however, it is still used in various other countries, such as in the EU, where it is only recommended for patients who cannot take other treatments.

Pergolide has also been tested for use in treatment of restless leg syndrome and hyperprolactinemia.

Pergolide is currently available for veterinary use. Under the trade name Prascend, manufactured by Boehringer Ingelheim, it is commonly used in horses for the treatment of pituitary hyperplasia at the pars intermedia, also known as Equine Cushing's Syndrome (ECS).

== Pharmacology ==
=== Pharmacodynamics ===
Pergolide acts as an agonist of dopamine D_{2} and D_{1} and serotonin 5-HT_{1A}, 5-HT_{1B}, 5-HT_{2A}, 5-HT_{2B}, and 5-HT_{2C} receptors. It may possess agonist activity at other dopamine receptor subtypes as well, similar to cabergoline. Although pergolide is more potent as an agonist of the D_{2} receptor, it has high D_{1} receptor affinity and is one of the most potent D_{1} receptor agonists of the dopamine receptor agonists that are clinically available. The agonist activity of pergolide at the D_{1} receptor somewhat alters its clinical and side effect profile in the treatment of Parkinson's disease. Pergolide has been said to be hallucinogenic due to activation of 5-HT_{2A} receptors. However, other sources have stated that the drug is non-hallucinogenic. It has been associated with cardiac valvulopathy due to activation of 5-HT_{2B} receptors.

Activities of pergolide at various sites
Site	Affinity (pK_{i} [nM])	Efficacy (E_{max} [%])	Action
D_{1}	6.47 ± 0.04	?	?
D_{2S}	7.85–8.30	90–112	Full agonist
D_{2L}	7.59–7.80	52–95	Partial to full agonist
D_{3}	0.9	71	Partial agonist
D_{4}	7.23 ± 0.09	56	Partial agonist
D_{5}	7.48 ± 0.21	?	?
5-HT_{1A}	8.72 ± 0.13	63	Partial agonist
5-HT_{1B}	6.55 ± 0.10	90	Partial agonist
5-HT_{1D}	7.88 ± 0.11	86	Partial agonist
5-HT_{2A}	7.92–8.08	24–103	Partial to full agonist
5-HT_{2B}	8.15–8.42	74–113	Partial to full agonist
5-HT_{2C}	6.53 ± 0.06	87	Partial agonist
5-HT_{6}	30	?	?
5-HT_{7}	1.0–18	?	?
α_{1A}	5.98 ± 0.11	?	?
α_{1B}	6.16 ± 0.08	?	?
α_{1D}	6.53 ± 0.19	?	?
α_{2A}	5.39 ± 0.29	31	Partial agonist
α_{2B}	7.30 ± 0.09	70	Partial agonist
α_{2C}	7.49 ± 0.8	16	Partial agonist
α_{2D}	7.17 ± 0.01	?	?
β_{1}	>10,000	–	–
β_{2}	>10,000	–	–
H_{1}	1,698	?	?
M_{1}	>10,000	–	–
σ_{1}	>10,000	–	–
σ_{2}	923	?	?
Notes: All receptors are human except α_{2D}-adrenergic, which is rat (no human counterpart), and 5-HT_{6}, 5-HT_{7}, σ_{1}, and σ_{2}, which are all rodent (rat or guinea pig).

== Side effects ==
In 2003, pergolide was reported to be associated with a form of heart disease called cardiac fibrosis. In March 2007, the United States Food and Drug Administration announced a voluntary withdrawal of the drug by manufacturers due to the possibility of heart valve damage. This damage is thought to be due to pergolide's action at the 5-HT_{2B} serotonin receptors of cardiac myocytes, causing proliferative valve disease by the same mechanism as ergotamine, methysergide, fenfluramine, and other serotonin 5-HT_{2B} agonists, including serotonin itself when elevated in the blood in carcinoid syndrome. Among similar antiparkinsonian drugs, cabergoline, but not lisuride, exhibit this same type of serotonin receptor binding and, in January 2007, cabergoline (Dostinex) was also reported to be associated with valvular proliferation heart damage.

Pergolide has also been shown to impair associative learning, and can rarely cause Raynaud's phenomenon.

=== Addictive behaviors ===
At least one British pergolide user has attracted some media attention with claims that it has caused him to develop a gambling addiction. In June 2010, it was reported that more than 100 Australian users of the drug are suing the manufacturer over both gambling and sex addiction problems they claim are the result of the drug's side effects.

== Chemistry ==
=== Analogues ===
Analogues of pergolide include LY-116467 (LY-062, 6-methylpergolide), LY-158A (6-ethylpergolide), and tiomergine (CF 25-397), among others.

== Society and culture ==
=== Brand names ===
Brand names of pergolide include Permax and Prascend (veterinary), among others.

=== Recreational use ===
Pergolide has been reported to produce psychedelic effects such as visual hallucinations and dissociation at supratherapeutic doses and has been used for recreational purposes rarely.

== Research ==
Pergolide has been studied in the treatment of social anxiety disorder in one small study but was found to be ineffective.

== See also ==
- Substituted ergoline
- Non-hallucinogenic 5-HT_{2A} receptor agonist
