= C17H22N2S =

The molecular formula C_{17}H_{22}N_{2}S (molar mass: 286.44 g/mol) may refer to:

- Thenalidine
- LY-116467
