= C20H26N4O =

The molecular formula C_{20}H_{26}N_{4}O (molar mass: 338.45 g/mol, exact mass: 338.2107 u) may refer to:

- Lisuride
