= C24H33NO3 =

The molecular formula C_{24}H_{33}NO_{3} (molar mass: 383.52 g/mol, exact mass: 383.2460 u) may refer to:

- Denaverine
- Guineesine
- Naftidrofuryl, also known as nafronyl
