= Lisuride =

Chemical compound

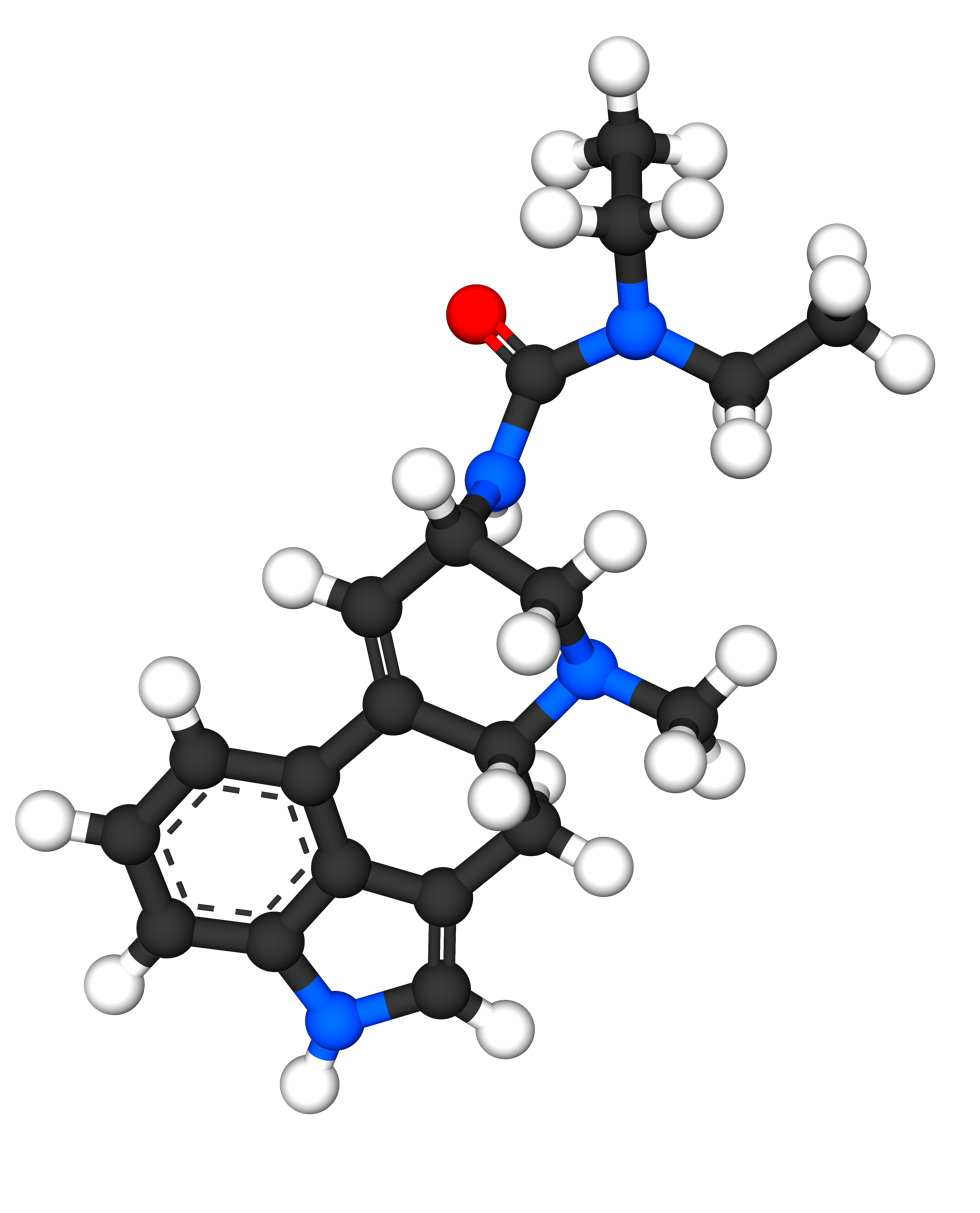

Clinical data
- Trade names: Dopergin, others
- Other names: Lysuride; Mesorgydin; Methylergol carbamide; 1,1-Diethyl-3-(6-methyl-9,10-didehydroergolin-8α-yl)urea
- AHFS/Drugs.com: International Drug Names
- Routes of administration: Oral; Investigational: Subcutaneous implant, transdermal patch
- Drug class: Serotonin receptor agonist; Dopamine receptor agonist
- ATC code: G02CB02 (WHO) N02CA07 (WHO)

Legal status
- Legal status: BR: Class C1 (Other controlled substances); In general: ℞ (Prescription only)

Pharmacokinetic data
- Bioavailability: 10–20%
- Protein binding: 60–70%
- Metabolism: Hepatic
- Metabolites: More than 15 known
- Elimination half-life: 2 hours
- Excretion: Renal and biliary in equal amounts

Identifiers
- IUPAC name: 1,1-Diethyl-3-(7-methyl-4,6,6a,7,8,9-hexahydro-indolo[4,3-fg]quinolin-9-yl)-urea
- CAS Number: 18016-80-3
- PubChem CID: 28864
- IUPHAR/BPS: 43
- DrugBank: DB00589
- ChemSpider: 26847
- UNII: E0QN3D755O
- KEGG: D08132
- ChEBI: CHEBI:51164
- ChEMBL: ChEMBL157138
- CompTox Dashboard (EPA): DTXSID30274075 DTXSID3023217, DTXSID30274075
- ECHA InfoCard: 100.038.099

Chemical and physical data
- Formula: C_{20}H_{26}N_{4}O
- Molar mass: 338.455 g·mol^{−1}
- 3D model (JSmol): Interactive image
- SMILES: [H][C@@]12Cc3c[nH]c4cccc(C1=C[C@H](NC(=O)N(CC)CC)CN2C)c34
- InChI: InChI=1S/C20H26N4O/c1-4-24(5-2)20(25)22-14-10-16-15-7-6-8-17-19(15)13(11-21-17)9-18(16)23(3)12-14/h6-8,10-11,14,18,21H,4-5,9,12H2,1-3H3,(H,22,25)/t14-,18+/m0/s1; Key:BKRGVLQUQGGVSM-KBXCAEBGSA-N

Lisuride, sold under the brand name Dopergin among others, is a monoaminergic medication of the ergoline family which is used in the treatment of Parkinson's disease, migraine, and high prolactin levels. It is taken by mouth.

Side effects of lisuride include nausea and vomiting, dizziness, headache, fatigue or drowsiness, insomnia or sleep, gastrointestinal disturbances such as abdominal pain or diarrhea, nasal congestion or runny nose, and hypotension, and hallucinations or confusion (particularly at higher doses). Rarely, serious side effects such as cardiac or pulmonary fibrosis have been reported with long-term use, but they are extremely uncommon.

Lisuride acts as a mixed agonist and antagonist of dopamine, serotonin, and adrenergic receptors. Activation of specific dopamine receptors is thought to be responsible for its effectiveness in the treatment of Parkinson's disease and ability to suppress prolactin levels, while interactions with serotonin receptors are thought to be principally involved in its effectiveness for migraine. It is very similar in chemical structure to lysergic acid diethylamide (LSD).

== Medical uses ==
Lisuride is used to lower prolactin and, in low doses, to prevent migraine attacks. The use of lisuride as initial antiparkinsonian medication for Parkinson's disease has been advocated, delaying the need for levodopa until lisuride becomes insufficient for controlling the parkinsonian symptoms. Evidence is insufficient to support lisuride in the treatment of advanced Parkinson's disease as an alternative to levodopa or bromocriptine.

== Side effects ==
Side effects of lisuride include nausea and lowered blood pressure, among others.

== Pharmacology ==
=== Pharmacodynamics ===
Lisuride activities
Target	Affinity (K_{i}, nM)
5-HT_{1A}	0.15–6.9 (K_{i}); 1.3 (EC_{50}); 98% (E_{max})
5-HT_{1B}	16–18.6 (K_{i}); 26.3 (EC_{50}); 85% (E_{max})
5-HT_{1D}	0.977–>10,000; 3.24 (EC_{50}); 81% (E_{max})
5-HT_{1E}	44.3
5-HT_{1F}	ND
5-HT_{2A}	0.74–5.4 (K_{i}); 0.78–7,900 (EC_{50}); 6–73% (E_{max})
5-HT_{2B}	1.07–2.9 (K_{i}); 1.10 (IC_{50}); 0% (E_{max})
5-HT_{2C}	5.3–>10,000 (K_{i}); 7.76–23,614 (EC_{50}); 17–79% (E_{max})
5-HT_{3}	>10,000
5-HT_{4}	ND
5-HT_{5A}	3.1
5-HT_{6}	7.3
5-HT_{7}	6.8
α_{1A}	5.5–24.6 (K_{i}); 9.77 (IC_{50}); 0% (E_{max})
α_{1B}	16.6–250.9
α_{1D}	2.95
α_{2A}	0.055–1.8 (K_{i}); 0.295 (IC_{50}); 0% (E_{max})
α_{2B}	0.13–0.5 (K_{i}); 0.933 (IC_{50}); 0% (E_{max})
α_{2C}	0.4 (K_{i}); 1.07 (IC_{50}); 0% (E_{max})
β_{1}	8.2–67.6
β_{2}	7.94–35.3
β_{3}	ND
D_{1}	64.6–>10,000 (K_{i}); 8.3–9.4 (EC_{50}); 31–38% (E_{max})
D_{2}	0.18–6.7 (K_{i}); 0.288–0.724 (EC_{50}); 21–55% (E_{max})
D_{3}	0.39–135.7 (K_{i}); 0.575 (EC_{50}); 49% (E_{max})
D_{4}	3.8–6.77 (K_{i}); 5.89 (EC_{50}); 32% (E_{max})
D_{5}	3.5–77
H_{1}	ND
H_{2}	114.3
H_{3}	>10,000
H_{4}	ND
M_{1}–M_{5}	>10,000
I_{1}	>10,000
σ_{1}	ND
σ_{2}	ND
TAAR1	ND
SERT	>10,000 (K_{i})
NET	>10,000
DAT	>10,000 (K_{i})
Notes: The smaller the value, the more avidly the drug binds to the site. All proteins are human unless otherwise specified. Refs:

Lisuride is a ligand of dopamine, serotonin, and adrenergic receptors as well as the histamine H_{1} receptor. It has sub-nanomolar affinity for the dopamine D_{2}, and D_{3} receptors, serotonin 5-HT_{1A} and 5-HT_{1D} receptors, and α_{2A}-, α_{2B}-, and α_{2C}-adrenergic receptors, and low-nanomolar affinity for the dopamine D_{1}, D_{4}, and D_{5} receptors, serotonin 5-HT_{2A}, 5-HT_{2B}, and 5-HT_{2C} receptors, α_{1A}-, α_{1B}-, and α_{1D}-adrenergic receptors, and histamine H_{1} receptor. Lisuride is a partial agonist of the D_{2}, D_{3}, D_{4}, 5-HT_{2A}, 5-HT_{2C}, 5-HT_{5A}, and H_{1} receptors, a full or near-full agonist of the 5-HT_{1A}, 5-HT_{1B}, and 5-HT_{1D} receptors, and a silent antagonist of the 5-HT_{2B} receptor and α_{1A}-, α_{2A}-, α_{2B}-, and α_{2C}-adrenergic receptors. Due to its highly non-selective pharmacological activity, lisuride is described as a "dirty drug". The effectiveness of lisuride in Parkinson's disease and hyperprolactinemia is thought to be mostly due to activation of dopamine D_{2} receptors.

While lisuride has a similar receptor binding profile to the more well-known and chemically similar ergoline lysergic acid diethylamide (LSD; N,N-diethyllysergamide) and acts as a partial agonist of the serotonin 5-HT_{2A} receptor likewise, it lacks the psychedelic effects of LSD and hence is non-hallucinogenic. Research suggests that the lack of psychedelic effects with lisuride may arise from biased agonism of the 5-HT_{2A} receptor. Stimulation of the 5-HT_{2A} protomer within the 5-HT_{2A}–mGlu2 receptor complex evokes psychedelic effects, while these effects do not occur during sole stimulation of monomeric 5-HT_{2A} receptors. Accordingly, different G proteins are involved. Lisuride behaves as an agonist at the 5-HT_{2A} receptor monomer. Since it competitively antagonizes the effects of LSD, it may be regarded as a protomer antagonist of the 5-HT_{2A}–mGluR heteromer. GPCR oligomers are discrete entities and usually possess properties distinct from their parent monomeric receptors. However, this theory is controversial, and other research has found that 5-HT_{2A}–mGlu_{2} dimers may not be essential for psychedelic effects. Lisuride shows weak or no G_{q} pathway recruitment and this may be responsible for its non-hallucinogenic nature. Alternatively, lisuride is an extremely potent serotonin 5-HT_{1A} receptor agonist, and this might inhibit serotonin 5-HT_{2A} receptor-mediated hallucinogenic effects.

Although lisuride has widely been said to be non-hallucinogenic, this may not actually be true. Lisuride has been associated with incidence of visual and auditory hallucinations, sensory disturbances, delusions, and other hallucinogenic effects at high doses. It may simply be that typical therapeutic doses of lisuride are too low to adequately engage the serotonin 5-HT_{2A} receptor and produce hallucinogenic effects but that hallucinogenic effects can be produced at higher doses. Both serotonin 5-HT_{2A} receptor agonism and dopamine D_{2} receptor agonism might contribute to the hallucinogenic effects of lisuride. Lisuride's potent activities at other receptors besides the serotonin 5-HT_{2A} receptor and its associated prominent side effects at higher doses, like nausea, hypotension, blurred vision, and anxiety, may limit its potential for being dosed high enough to produce hallucinogenic effects. In animals, lisuride partially to fully substitutes for LSD and other psychedelics in drug discrimination tests in rodents and monkeys, but does not produce the head-twitch response in rodents. However, lisuride does produce the head-twitch response in the least shrew, a non-rodent species that is said to be highly sensitive to serotonin 5-HT_{2A} receptor agonists. When a modified drug discrimination paradigm is employed in which animals are trained to discriminate two training drugs (lisuride and LSD) and vehicle however, lisuride no longer substitutes for LSD.

Lisuride dose-dependently suppresses prolactin levels due to its dopaminergic activity. As an antagonist of the serotonin 5-HT_{2B} receptor, lisuride has no risk of cardiac valvulopathy, in contrast to related ergolines like pergolide and cabergoline.

Minute amounts of lisuride suppress the firing of dorsal raphe serotonergic neurons, presumably due to agonist activity at 5-HT_{1A} receptors. Noradrenergic neurons of the locus coeruleus were accelerated by the drug at somewhat higher doses, consistent with α_{1}-adrenergic receptor antagonist activity. Pars compacta dopamine neurons demonstrated a variable response.

Lisuride, along with the psychedelic drugs LSD and psilocin, has been reported to act as a potent positive allosteric modulator of the tropomyosin receptor kinase B (TrkB), one of the receptors of brain-derived neurotrophic factor (BDNF). However, subsequent studies with LSD and psilocin failed to reproduce these findings and instead found no interaction of these agents with TrkB.

=== Pharmacokinetics ===
Absorption of lisuride from the gastrointestinal tract with oral administration is complete. The absolute bioavailability of lisuride is 10 to 20% due to high first-pass metabolism. The plasma protein binding of lisuride is 60 to 70%. Peak levels of lisuride occur 60 to 80 minutes after ingestion with high variability between individuals. The elimination half-life of lisuride is approximately 2 hours. This is shorter than most other dopamine agonists. Lisuride has more than 15 known metabolites.

== Chemistry ==
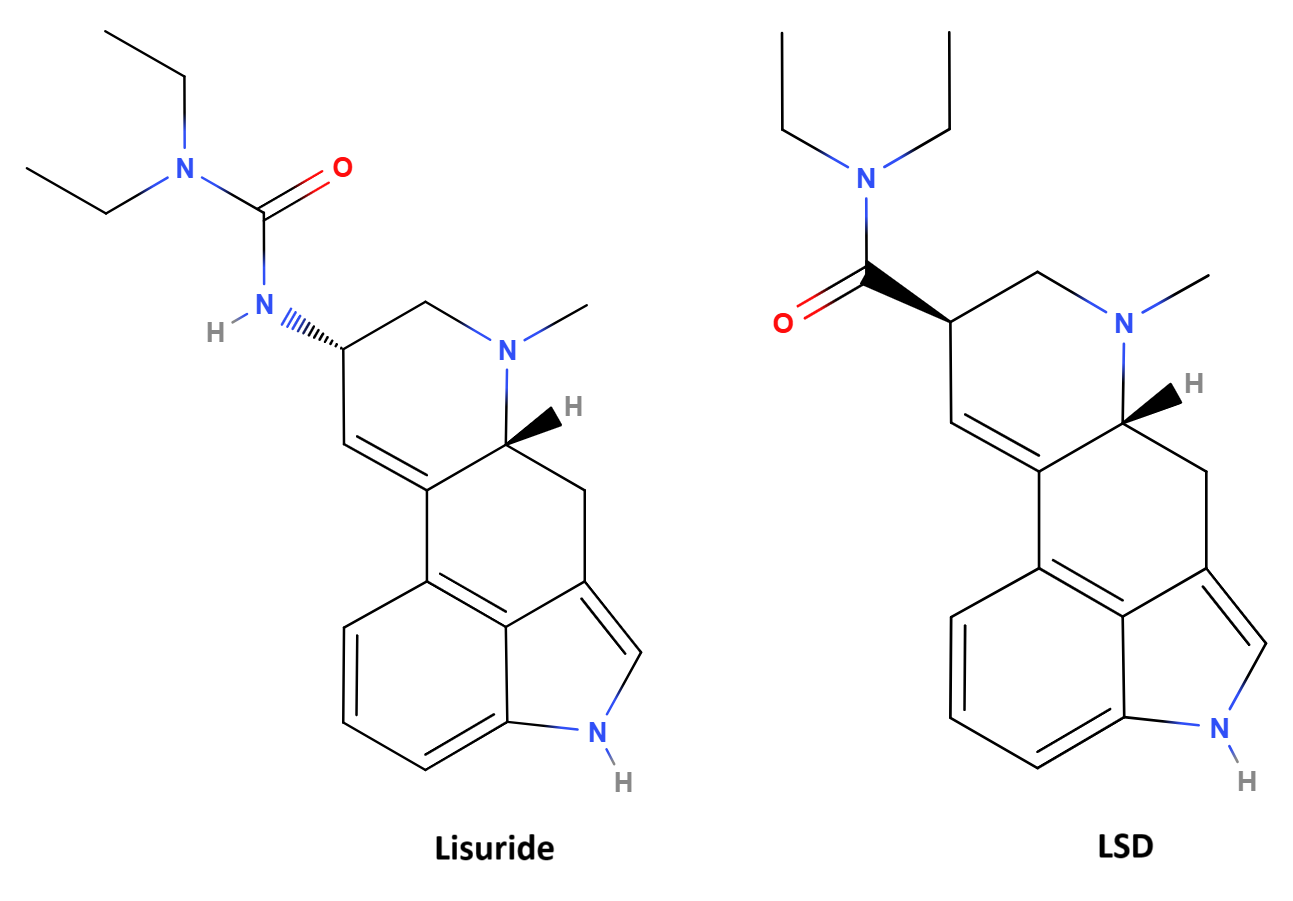
Chemical structures of lisuride and lysergic acid diethylamide (LSD).

Lisuride, also known as 1,1-diethyl-3-(6-methyl-9,10-didehydroergolin-8α-yl)urea, is an ergoline derivative. It is almost identical in chemical structure to lysergic acid diethylamide (LSD), except that LSD's 8-position carboxamide group has been replaced with a urea group and the 8-position stereochemistry is inverted. Lisuride is described as the free base and as the hydrogen maleate salt.

=== Analogues ===
Bromination of lisuride gives bromerguride (2-bromolisuride), which has a "reversed pharmacodynamic profile" compared to that of lisuride.

Other analogues of lisuride include terguride, proterguride, mesulergine, and etisulergine, among others.

== History ==
Lisuride was synthesized by Zikán and Semonský at the Research Institute for Pharmacy and Biochemistry at Prague (later SPOFA) as an antimigraine agent analogous to methysergide and was described in 1960. It was marketed by the early 1970s.

== Society and culture ==
=== Generic names ===
Lisuride is the INN and lysuride is the BAN.

=== Brand names ===
Lisuride has been sold under brand names including Arolac, Cuvalit, Dopagon, Dopergin, Dopergine, Eunal, Lisenil, Lizenil, Lysenyl, Proclacam, Prolacam, and Revanil.

=== Availability ===
Lisuride was previously more widely available throughout the world, but as of 2020 it appears to be marketed only in Egypt, France, Italy, Kuwait, Lebanon, Mexico, New Zealand, and Pakistan. Lisuride is not currently available in the United States.

== Research ==
Preliminary clinical research suggests that transdermal administration of lisuride may be useful in the treatment of Parkinson's disease. As lisuride has poor bioavailability when taken orally and has a short half-life, continuous transdermal administration offers significant advantages and could make the compound a much more consistent therapeutic agent. Lisuride was under development as a transdermal patch and subcutaneous implant for the treatment of Parkinson's disease, restless legs syndrome, and dyskinesias in the 2000s and 2010s, but development was discontinued.

== See also ==
- Substituted lysergamide § Related compounds
- Non-hallucinogenic 5-HT_{2A} receptor agonist
- XC130-A10H (XC-130)
