= C19H23NO5 =

The molecular formula C_{19}H_{23}NO_{5} (molar mass: 345.39 g/mol) may refer to:

- Semorphone
- Tretoquinol, a beta-adrenergic agonist
- WB-4101, an antagonist at the α_{1B}-adrenergic receptor.
