= Phendioxan =

Names
- Preferred IUPAC name 2-(2,6-Dimethoxyphenoxy)-N-{[(2R,3R)-3-phenyl-2,3-dihydro-1,4-benzodioxin-2-yl]methyl}ethan-1-amine

Identifiers
CAS Number	130905-04-3
3D model (JSmol)	Interactive image
ChEMBL	ChEMBL287935
ChemSpider	161227
PubChem CID	185453
UNII	9GA78MV6TU
CompTox Dashboard (EPA)	DTXSID50926963
- InChI: InChI=1S/C25H27NO5/c1-27-21-13-8-14-22(28-2)25(21)29-16-15-26-17-23-24(18-9-4-3-5-10-18)31-20-12-7-6-11-19(20)30-23/h3-14,23-24,26H,15-17H2,1-2H3/t23-,24-/m1/s1 Key: UVEKKXRFQCNLQE-DNQXCXABSA-N; InChI=1/C25H27NO5/c1-27-21-13-8-14-22(28-2)25(21)29-16-15-26-17-23-24(18-9-4-3-5-10-18)31-20-12-7-6-11-19(20)30-23/h3-14,23-24,26H,15-17H2,1-2H3/t23-,24-/m1/s1 Key: UVEKKXRFQCNLQE-DNQXCXABBD
- SMILES: COC1=C(C(=CC=C1)OC)OCCNC[C@@H]2[C@H](OC3=CC=CC=C3O2)C4=CC=CC=C4

Properties
Chemical formula	C_{25}H_{27}NO_{5}
Molar mass	421.493 g·mol^{−1}
- Except where otherwise noted, data are given for materials in their standard state (at 25 °C [77 °F], 100 kPa). Infobox references

Phendioxan is an α_{1}-adrenergic receptor antagonist.

== See also ==
- WB-4101
