= Proterguride =

Clinical data
- Other names: VUFB-13416; VUFB13416; ZK-39437; ZK39437; 6-Propylterguride; 6-Propyl-9,10-dihydrolisuride; N,N-Diethyl-N'-(6-propylergolin-8α-yl)urea
- Drug class: Dopamine agonist; Prolactin inhibitor; Antiparkinsonian agent
- ATC code: None

Identifiers
- IUPAC name: 3-[(6aR,9S,10aR)-7-propyl-6,6a,8,9,10,10a-hexahydro-4H-indolo[4,3-fg]quinolin-9-yl]-1,1-diethylurea
- CAS Number: 77650-95-4
- PubChem CID: 71999
- ChemSpider: 64999
- UNII: 10661OD4VE
- ChEMBL: ChEMBL2106986
- CompTox Dashboard (EPA): DTXSID70228299

Chemical and physical data
- Formula: C_{22}H_{32}N_{4}O
- Molar mass: 368.525 g·mol^{−1}
- 3D model (JSmol): Interactive image
- SMILES: CCCN1C[C@H](C[C@H]2[C@H]1CC3=CNC4=CC=CC2=C34)NC(=O)N(CC)CC
- InChI: InChI=1S/C22H32N4O/c1-4-10-26-14-16(24-22(27)25(5-2)6-3)12-18-17-8-7-9-19-21(17)15(13-23-19)11-20(18)26/h7-9,13,16,18,20,23H,4-6,10-12,14H2,1-3H3,(H,24,27)/t16-,18+,20+/m0/s1; Key:FCRJELOYDVBTGW-ILZDJORESA-N

Proterguride (INN; developmental code names VUFB-13416, ZK-39437), also known as 6-propylterguride or 6-propyl-9,10-dihydrolisuride, is a dopamine agonist of the ergoline family described as a prolactin inhibitor and antiparkinsonian agent which was never marketed. It is closely structurally related to certain other ergolines like terguride and lisuride. Besides dopamine receptors, the drug also interacts with serotonin, adrenergic, and histamine receptors. Proterguride was first described in the literature by at least 1981.

== See also ==
- Substituted ergoline
