= LY-116467 =

Clinical data
- Other names: LY116467; LY-116,467; LY-062; LY062; 6-Methylpergolide; 6-Methyl-pergolide; 6-Methyl-8β-((methylthio)methyl)ergoline
- Drug class: Dopamine receptor agonist; Serotonin receptor modulator
- ATC code: None

Identifiers
- IUPAC name: (6aR,9R,10aR)-7-methyl-9-(methylsulfanylmethyl)-6,6a,8,9,10,10a-hexahydro-4H-indolo[4,3-fg]quinoline
- PubChem CID: 21154394
- ChemSpider: 23976593

Chemical and physical data
- Formula: C_{17}H_{22}N_{2}S
- Molar mass: 286.44 g·mol^{−1}
- 3D model (JSmol): Interactive image
- SMILES: CN1C[C@@H](C[C@H]2[C@H]1CC3=CNC4=CC=CC2=C34)CSC
- InChI: InChI=1S/C17H22N2S/c1-19-9-11(10-20-2)6-14-13-4-3-5-15-17(13)12(8-18-15)7-16(14)19/h3-5,8,11,14,16,18H,6-7,9-10H2,1-2H3/t11-,14-,16-/m1/s1; Key:HEZLHSNBFOCKCQ-DJSGYFEHSA-N

LY-116467, also known as LY-062, 6-methylpergolide, or 6-methyl-8β-((methylthio)methyl)ergoline, is a dopamine receptor agonist of the ergoline family which was never marketed. It is the analogue of the antiparkinsonian agent pergolide in which the propyl group at the 6 position has been replaced with a methyl group.

The drug shows high affinity for the dopamine D_{2} receptor (K_{i} = 12 nM), where it acts as a potent full agonist with similar potency and efficacy as pergolide (EC_{50} = 14.5–16.2 nM; E_{max} = 90–97%). In addition to its dopamine receptor agonism, LY-116467 also shows high affinity for serotonin 5-HT_{1} and 5-HT_{2} receptors (K_{0.5} = 7.7 nM and K_{i} = 70 nM, respectively) as well as affinity for the α_{1}- and α_{2}-adrenergic receptors.

Compared to pergolide, LY-116467 showed 3.4-fold lower affinity for the dopamine D_{2} receptor, 4-fold higher affinity for the serotonin 5-HT_{1} receptor, and 1.3-fold lower affinity for the serotonin 5-HT_{2} receptor. The drug is similarly or less potent as a dopamine receptor agonist than pergolide in vivo. Whereas pergolide is a potent serotonin 5-HT_{2A} and 5-HT_{2B} receptor partial agonist, LY-116467 instead acted as a potent silent antagonist of these receptors. The drug is a weak antagonist of the α_{1}- and α_{2}-adrenergic receptors similarly to pergolide.

LY-116467 was first described in the scientific literature by 1982. It has been suggested that LY-116467 may lack the cardiac valvulopathy of pergolide and could be used clinically as a non-cardiotoxic replacement for it.

== See also ==
- Substituted ergoline
