= Methylergometrine =

Chemical compound

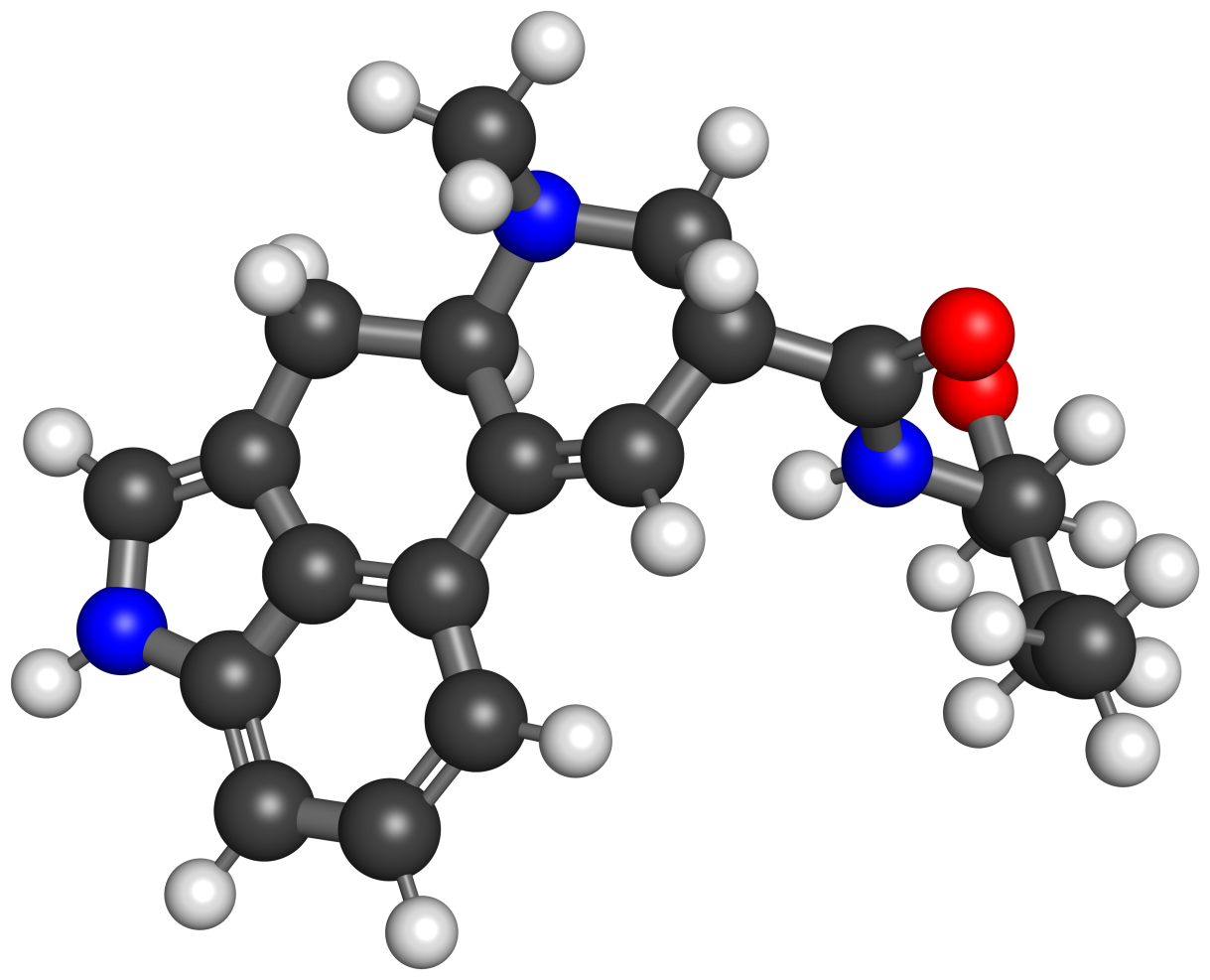

Clinical data
- Trade names: Methergine
- Other names: Methylergonovine; methylergobasin; Methylergobasine; Methylergobrevin; d-Lysergic acid 1-butanolamide; N-[(2S)-1-Hydroxybutan-2-yl]-6-methyl-9,10-didehydroergoline-8β-carboxamide
- AHFS/Drugs.com: International Drug Names
- MedlinePlus: a601077
- Pregnancy category: Contraindicated
- Routes of administration: Oral
- Drug class: Monoamine receptor modulator; Oxytocic; Antimigraine agent; Serotonergic psychedelic; Hallucinogen
- ATC code: G02AB01 (WHO)

Legal status
- Legal status: In general: ℞ (Prescription only)

Pharmacokinetic data
- Bioavailability: Oral: 60% IM: 78%
- Metabolism: Liver (extensive first-pass metabolism)
- Elimination half-life: 3.4 hours
- Excretion: Mostly bile

Identifiers
- IUPAC name: (6aR,9R)-N-[(2S)-1-hydroxybutan-2-yl]-7-methyl-6,6a,8,9-tetrahydro-4H-indolo[4,3-fg]quinoline-9-carboxamide
- CAS Number: 113-42-8
- PubChem CID: 8226
- IUPHAR/BPS: 150
- DrugBank: DB00353
- ChemSpider: 7933
- UNII: W53L6FE61V
- KEGG: D08207
- ChEMBL: ChEMBL1201356
- CompTox Dashboard (EPA): DTXSID00904978 DTXSID1023283, DTXSID00904978
- ECHA InfoCard: 100.003.661

Chemical and physical data
- Formula: C_{20}H_{25}N_{3}O_{2}
- Molar mass: 339.439 g·mol^{−1}
- 3D model (JSmol): Interactive image
- Melting point: 172 °C (342 °F)
- Solubility in water: Insoluble mg/mL (20 °C)
- SMILES: CC[C@@H](CO)NC(=O)[C@@H]2/C=C1/c3cccc4N\C=C(\C[C@H]1N(C)C2)c34
- InChI: InChI=1S/C20H25N3O2/c1-3-14(11-24)22-20(25)13-7-16-15-5-4-6-17-19(15)12(9-21-17)8-18(16)23(2)10-13/h4-7,9,13-14,18,21,24H,3,8,10-11H2,1-2H3,(H,22,25)/t13-,14+,18-/m1/s1; Key:UNBRKDKAWYKMIV-QWQRMKEZSA-N

Methylergometrine, also known as methylergonovine and sold under the brand name Methergine, is a medication of the ergoline and lysergamide groups which is used as an oxytocic in obstetrics and as an antimigraine agent in the treatment of migraine headaches. It reportedly produces psychedelic effects similar to those of lysergic acid diethylamide (LSD) at high doses.

== Medical uses ==
=== Obstetric use ===
Methylergometrine is a smooth muscle constrictor that mostly acts on the uterus. It is most commonly used to prevent or control excessive bleeding following childbirth and spontaneous or elective abortion, and also to aid in expulsion of retained products of conception after a missed abortion (miscarriage in which all or part of the fetus remains in the uterus) and to help deliver the placenta after childbirth. It is available as tablets or injection (IM or IV) or in liquid form to be taken orally.

=== Migraine ===
Methylergometrine is sometimes used for both prevention and acute treatment of migraine. It is an active metabolite of methysergide. In the treatment of cluster headaches, methylergometrine has been initiated at a dose of 0.2 mg/day, rapidly increased to 0.2 mg three times per day, and increased to a maximum of 0.4 mg three times per day.

== Contraindications ==
Methylergometrine is contraindicated in patients with hypertension and pre-eclampsia. It is also contraindicated in HIV positive patients taking protease inhibitors, delavirdine, and efavirenz (which is also an agonist at the 5-HT_{2A}–mGlu2 receptor protomer and increases the chances of a patient experiencing hallucinations during methylergometrine therapy).

== Side effects ==
Adverse effects include:

- Nausea, vomiting, and diarrhea
- Dizziness
- Pulmonary hypertension
- Coronary artery vasoconstriction
- Severe systemic hypertension (especially in patients with pre-eclampsia)
- Convulsions

In excessive doses, methylergometrine can also lead to cramping, respiratory depression and coma.

== Interactions ==
Methylergometrine likely interacts with drugs that inhibit the liver enzyme CYP3A4, such as azole antifungals, macrolide antibiotics and many HIV drugs. It can also increase constriction of blood vessels caused by sympathomimetic drugs and other ergot alkaloids.

== Pharmacology ==
=== Pharmacodynamics ===
Methylergometrine activities
Site	Affinity (K_{i} [nM])	Efficacy (E_{max} [%])	Action
5-HT_{1A}	1.5–2.0	?	Full agonist
5-HT_{1B}	251	?	Full agonist
5-HT_{1D}	0.86–2.9	70	Partial agonist
5-HT_{1E}	89	?	Full agonist
5-HT_{1F}	31	?	Full agonist
5-HT_{2A}	0.35–1.1	?	Full agonist
5-HT_{2B}	0.46–2.2	?	Agonist
5-HT_{2C}	4.6–43.7	?	Full agonist
5-HT_{3}	?	–	–
5-HT_{5A}	?	24.4	Full agonist
5-HT_{6}	?	?	Full agonist
5-HT_{7}	11–52	?	Full agonist
Notes: All sites are human except 5-HT_{1B} (rat) and 5-HT_{7} (guinea pig). Refs: Additional refs:

Methylergometrine is an agonist or antagonist to serotonin, dopamine, and α-adrenergic receptors. Its specific binding and activation pattern on these receptors leads to a highly, if not completely, specific contraction of smooth uterus muscle via serotonin 5-HT_{2A} receptors, while blood vessels are affected to a lesser extent compared to other ergot alkaloids. It has been found to interact with the serotonin 5-HT_{1A}, 5-HT_{1B}, 5-HT_{1E}, 5-HT_{1F}, 5-HT_{2A}, 5-HT_{2B}, 5-HT_{2C}, 5-HT_{5A}, and 5-HT_{7} receptors. Methylergometrine is an agonist of the serotonin 5-HT_{2B} receptor and may be linked to cardiac valvulopathy.

=== Pharmacokinetics ===
The bioavailability of methylergometrine is 60% via oral administration and 78% by intramuscular injection. It is metabolized in the liver, with extensive first-pass metabolism. The elimination half-life of the drug is 3.4 hours. It is eliminated mainly via metabolism and then excreted.

== Natural occurrence ==
Previously thought to be an exclusively synthetic compound, it has been reported to occur naturally in Argyreia nervosa (Hawaiian baby woodrose). The drug is on the World Health Organization's List of Essential Medicines.

== Chemistry ==
Methylergometrine, also known as d-lysergic acid 1-butanolamide, is a derivative of the ergoline and lysergamide classes and is structurally related to ergometrine (d-lysergic acid β-propanolamide) and lysergic acid diethylamide (LSD).

== History ==
Methylergometrine was first described in the scientific literature by 1945.

== Society and culture ==
=== Recreational use ===
Methylergometrine is a synthetic analogue of ergometrine, a psychedelic alkaloid found in ergot, and many species of morning glory. Methylergometrine is a member of the ergoline family and chemically similar to LSD, ergine, ergometrine, and lysergic acid. According to Jonathan Ott, methylergometrine produces LSD-like psychedelic effects at doses of 2 mg and above. Clinical effectiveness of methylergometrine as a medication occurs around 200 μg, which is 10 times lower than the hallucinogenic threshold.

=== Legal status ===
==== Canada ====
Methylergometrine is not controlled substance in Canada.

==== United States ====
Methylergometrine is not an explicitly controlled substance in the United States.

== See also ==
- Substituted lysergamide
- Ergometrine
- Morning glory (drug)
