= Tiomergine =

Clinical data
- Other names: CF 25-397; CF25-397; CF-25397; CF25397; 9,10-Didehydro-6-methyl-8β-((2-pyridylthio)methyl)ergoline
- Drug class: Dopamine receptor agonist; Serotonin receptor agonist
- ATC code: None

Identifiers
- IUPAC name: (6aR,9R)-7-methyl-9-(pyridin-2-ylsulfanylmethyl)-6,6a,8,9-tetrahydro-4H-indolo[4,3-fg]quinoline
- CAS Number: 57935-49-6
- PubChem CID: 9884658
- DrugBank: DB20293
- ChemSpider: 8060332
- UNII: 85J22V47HN
- ChEMBL: ChEMBL2104731
- CompTox Dashboard (EPA): DTXSID901024153

Chemical and physical data
- Formula: C_{21}H_{21}N_{3}S
- Molar mass: 347.48 g·mol^{−1}
- 3D model (JSmol): Interactive image
- SMILES: CN1C[C@@H](C=C2[C@H]1CC3=CNC4=CC=CC2=C34)CSC5=CC=CC=N5
- InChI: InChI=1S/C21H21N3S/c1-24-12-14(13-25-20-7-2-3-8-22-20)9-17-16-5-4-6-18-21(16)15(11-23-18)10-19(17)24/h2-9,11,14,19,23H,10,12-13H2,1H3/t14-,19-/m1/s1; Key:VCRAKEDGLIINLR-AUUYWEPGSA-N

Tiomergine (INN; developmental code name CF 25-397) is a dopamine receptor agonist of the ergoline family which was never marketed. It is an analogue of the antiparkinsonian agent pergolide.

In addition to its dopamine receptor agonism, tiomergine also acts as a potent serotonin receptor agonist, including binding to serotonin 5-HT_{1} and 5-HT_{2} receptors, and might actually act primarily via its serotonin receptor agonism. The drug produces antiparkinsonian-like effects in rodents. In contrast to other dopamine receptor agonists however, it produces little to no stereotypy. In addition, tiomergine produces little change in locomotor activity on its own but reverses reserpine-induced catalepsy. Unlike many other dopamine receptor agonists like pergolide, tiomergine has been identified as a selective or preferential dopamine autoreceptor agonist, with little activity at postsynaptic receptors.

In contrast to animal studies, tiomergine caused severe deterioration in parkinsonism symptoms in humans in a clinical trial. It was also ineffective in treating psychosis in people with schizophrenia. Besides these uses, tiomergine has been investigated for the treatment of dyskinesia and dystonia. However, it was ineffective for tardive dyskinesia as well.

Tiomergine was first described in the scientific literature by 1976. It was developed by Sandoz.

== See also ==
- Substituted ergoline
