= Alfaprostol =

Identifiers
CAS Number	74176-31-1
3D model (JSmol)	Interactive image
ChEMBL	ChEMBL2104662
ChemSpider	5293021
ECHA InfoCard	100.070.657
PubChem CID	6436172
UNII	4XKL2JJ08I
CompTox Dashboard (EPA)	DTXSID001021621
- InChI: InChI=1S/C24H38O5/c1-29-24(28)12-8-3-2-7-11-20-21(23(27)17-22(20)26)16-15-19(25)14-13-18-9-5-4-6-10-18/h2,7,18-23,25-27H,3-6,8-14,17H2,1H3/b7-2-/t19-,20+,21+,22-,23+/m0/s1 Key: OZDSQCVLNUIYLN-JNAAKWLTSA-N
- SMILES: COC(=O)CCC/C=C\C[C@H]1[C@H](C[C@H]([C@@H]1C#C[C@H](CCC2CCCCC2)O)O)O

Properties
Chemical formula	C_{24}H_{38}O_{5}
Molar mass	406.56 g/mol
- Except where otherwise noted, data are given for materials in their standard state (at 25 °C [77 °F], 100 kPa). Infobox references

Alfaprostol is a bioactive analog of prostaglandin F_{2α}. Alfaprostol is a luteolytic agent used injectably for scheduling of estrus in mares for purposes of planned breeding. It is also used for treating of postweaning anestrus in economically important farm animals. For these purposes, alfaprostol is more potent than naturally occurring prostaglandin F_{2α}.
