= Methysergide =

Chemical compound

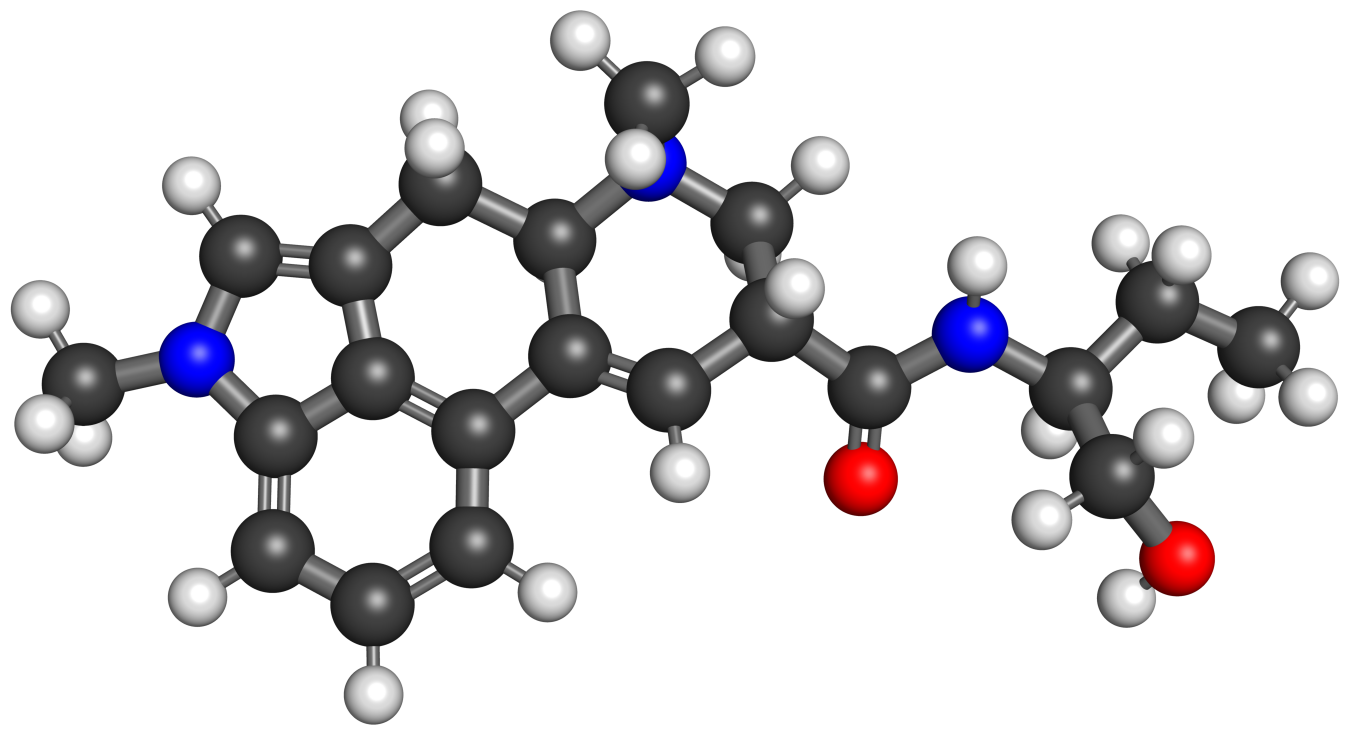

Clinical data
- Trade names: Deseril, Sansert
- Other names: UML-491; 1-Methylmethylergonovine; N-[(2S)-1-Hydroxybutan-2-yl]-1,6-dimethyl-9,10-didehydroergoline-8α-carboxamide; N-(1-(Hydroxymethyl)propyl)-1-methyl-D-lysergamide
- AHFS/Drugs.com: International Drug Names
- MedlinePlus: a603022
- Pregnancy category: AU: C
- Routes of administration: Oral
- Drug class: Monoamine receptor modulator; Antimigraine agent
- ATC code: N02CA04 (WHO)

Legal status
- Legal status: AU: S4 (Prescription only); BR: Class C1 (Other controlled substances); CA: ℞-only; UK: POM (Prescription only); US: ℞-only

Identifiers
- IUPAC name: (6aR,9R)-N-[(2S)-1-Hydroxybutan-2-yl]-4,7-dimethyl-6,6a,8,9-tetrahydroindolo[4,3-fg]quinoline-9-carboxamide
- CAS Number: 361-37-5
- PubChem CID: 9681
- IUPHAR/BPS: 134
- DrugBank: DB00247
- ChemSpider: 9300
- UNII: XZA9HY6Z98
- KEGG: D02357
- ChEMBL: ChEMBL1065
- CompTox Dashboard (EPA): DTXSID2023307
- ECHA InfoCard: 100.006.041

Chemical and physical data
- Formula: C_{21}H_{27}N_{3}O_{2}
- Molar mass: 353.466 g·mol^{−1}
- 3D model (JSmol): Interactive image
- SMILES: O=C(N[C@@H](CC)CO)[C@@H]3/C=C2/c4cccc1c4c(cn1C)C[C@H]2N(C3)C
- InChI: InChI=1S/C21H27N3O2/c1-4-15(12-25)22-21(26)14-8-17-16-6-5-7-18-20(16)13(10-23(18)2)9-19(17)24(3)11-14/h5-8,10,14-15,19,25H,4,9,11-12H2,1-3H3,(H,22,26)/t14-,15+,19-/m1/s1; Key:KPJZHOPZRAFDTN-ZRGWGRIASA-N

Methysergide, sold under the brand names Deseril and Sansert, is a monoaminergic medication which is used in the prevention and treatment of migraine and cluster headaches. It has been withdrawn from the market in the United States and Canada due to safety concerns. The drug has also been found to produce psychedelic effects at high doses. It is taken orally.

The drug is a prodrug of methylergometrine (methylergonovine), which circulates at levels about 10 times higher than those of methysergide. Whereas methysergide is a mixed agonist of some serotonin receptors (e.g., the serotonin 5-HT_{1} receptors) and antagonist of other serotonin receptors (e.g., the serotonin 5-HT_{2} receptors), methylergonovine is a non-selective agonist of most of the serotonin receptors, including of both the serotonin 5-HT_{1} and 5-HT_{2} receptor subgroups. Methysergide and methylergometrine are ergolines and lysergamides and are related to the ergot alkaloids.

Methysergide was first described in the literature by 1958. It is no longer recommended as a first-line therapy for migraines or cluster headaches. This is due to toxicity, such as cardiac valvulopathy, which was first reported with long-term use in the late 1960s. Ergot-based medications like methysergide fell out of favor for treatment of migraine with the introduction of the triptans in the 1980s.

== Medical uses ==
=== Migraine and cluster headaches ===
Methysergide is used exclusively to treat episodic and chronic migraine and for episodic and chronic cluster headaches. Methysergide is one of the most effective medications for the prevention of migraine, but is not intended for the treatment of an acute attack, it is to be taken daily as a preventative medication.

Methysergide has been known as an effective treatment for migraine and cluster headache for over 50 years. A 2016 investigation by the European Medicines Agency due to long-held questions about safety concerns was performed. To assess the need for continuing availability of methysergide, the International Headache Society performed an electronic survey among their professional members.

The survey revealed that 71.3% of all respondents had ever prescribed methysergide and 79.8% would prescribe it if it were to become available. Respondents used it more in cluster headache than migraine, and reserved it for use in refractory patients.

The European Medicines Agency (EMA) concluded "that the vast majority of headache experts in this survey regarded methysergide a unique treatment option for specific populations for which there are no alternatives, with an urgent need to continue its availability." This position was supported by the International Headache Society.

Updated guidelines published by Britain's National Health Service Migraine Trust in 2014 recommended "Methysergide medicines are now only to be used for preventing severe intractable migraine and cluster headache when standard medicines have failed".

=== Other uses ===
Methysergide is also used in carcinoid syndrome to treat severe diarrhea. It may also be used in the treatment of serotonin syndrome.

== Side effects ==
It has a known side effect, retroperitoneal and retropulmonary fibrosis, which is severe, although uncommon. This side effect has been estimated to occur in 1 in 5,000 patients. In addition, there is an increased risk of left-sided cardiac valve dysfunction.

== Interactions ==
Pre-treatment with methysergide has been reported to greatly potentiate and intensify the psychedelic effects of dimethyltryptamine (DMT) in humans. Since methysergide was one of the most potent serotonin antagonists in vitro known at the time, this led to the erroneous conclusion that DMT acted as a serotonin antagonist to produce its hallucinogenic effects. However, subsequent research has found that methysergide is a rapidly converted prodrug of methylergometrine, an efficacious serotonin receptor agonist, and that both methysergide and methylergometrine produce psychedelic effects themselves at supratherapeutic doses.

== Pharmacology ==
=== Pharmacodynamics ===
Methysergide activities
Site	Affinity (K_{i}, nM)	Efficacy (E_{max}, %)	Action
5-HT_{1A}	14–25	89%	Agonist
5-HT_{1B}	2.5–162	?	Full agonist
5-HT_{1D}	3.6–93	50%	Partial agonist
5-HT_{1E}	59–324	?	Full agonist
5-HT_{1F}	34	?	Full agonist
5-HT_{2A}	1.6–104	?	Full agonist
5-HT_{2B}	0.1–150	0–20%	Antagonist
5-HT_{2C}	0.95–4.5	0	Antagonist
5-HT_{3}	>10,000	–	–
5-HT_{5A}	>10,000	–	Antagonist
5-HT_{5B}	41–1,000	?	?
5-HT_{6}	30–372	?	?
5-HT_{7}	30–83	?	Antagonist
α_{1A}	>10,000	–	–
α_{1B}	>10,000	–	–
α_{1D}	?	?	?
α_{2A}	170–>1,000	?	?
α_{2B}	106	?	?
α_{2C}	88	?	?
β_{1}	>10,000	–	–
β_{2}	>10,000	–	–
D_{1}	290	?	?
D_{2}	200–>10,000	?	?
D_{3}	>10,000	–	–
D_{4}	>10,000	–	–
D_{5}	>10,000	–	–
H_{1}	3,000–>10,000	?	?
H_{2}	>10,000	–	–
M_{1}	5,459	?	?
M_{2}	6,126	?	?
M_{3}	4,632	?	?
M_{4}	>10,000	–	–
M_{5}	>10,000	–	–
Notes: All sites are human except 5-HT_{5B} (mouse/rat—no human counterpart) and D_{3} (rat). Negligible affinity (>10,000 nM) for various other receptors (GABA, glutamate, nicotinic acetylcholine, prostanoid) and for the monoamine transporters (SERT, NET, DAT). Methysergide's major active metabolite, methylergonovine, also contributes to its activity, most notably 5-HT_{2A} and 5-HT_{2B} receptor partial agonism. Refs: Additional refs:

Methysergide interacts with the serotonin 5-HT_{1A}, 5-HT_{1B}, 5-HT_{1D}, 5-HT_{1E}, 5-HT_{1F}, 5-HT_{2A}, 5-HT_{2B}, 5-HT_{2C}, 5-HT_{5A}, 5-HT_{6}, and 5-HT_{7} receptors and the α_{2A}-, α_{2B}-, and α_{2C}-adrenergic receptors. It does not have significant affinity for human 5-HT_{3}, dopamine, α_{1}-adrenergic, β-adrenergic, acetylcholine, GABA, glutamate, cannabinoid, or histamine receptors, nor for the monoamine transporters. Methysergide is an agonist of 5-HT_{1} receptors, including a partial agonist at the 5-HT_{1A} receptor, and is an antagonist at the 5-HT_{2A}, 5-HT_{2B}, 5-HT_{2C}, and 5-HT_{7} receptors. Methysergide is metabolized into methylergometrine in humans, which in contrast to methysergide is a partial agonist of the 5-HT_{2A} and 5-HT_{2B} receptors and also interacts with various other targets.

Methysergide antagonizes the effects of serotonin in blood vessels and gastrointestinal smooth muscle, but has few of the properties of other ergot alkaloids. It is thought that metabolism of methysergide into its active metabolite methylergonovine is responsible for the antimigraine effects of methysergide. Methylergonovine appears to be 10 times more potent than methysergide as an agonist of the 5-HT_{1B} and 5-HT_{1D} receptors and has higher intrinsic efficacy in activating these receptors. The antimigraine activity of methysergide might be specifically due to serotonin 5-HT_{2B} receptor antagonism.

Metabolism of methysergide into methylergonovine, which is a potent serotonin 5-HT_{2A} receptor agonist, is considered to be responsible for the psychedelic effects of methysergide at high doses. The psychedelic effects can specifically be attributed to activation of the serotonin 5-HT_{2A} receptor. The drug can activate the serotonin 5-HT_{2B} receptor due to metabolism into methylergonovine and for this reason has been associated with cardiac valvulopathy. It is thought that the serotonin receptor antagonism of methysergide is not able to overcome the serotonin receptor agonism of methylergonovine due to the much higher levels of methylergonovine during methysergide therapy.

=== Pharmacokinetics ===
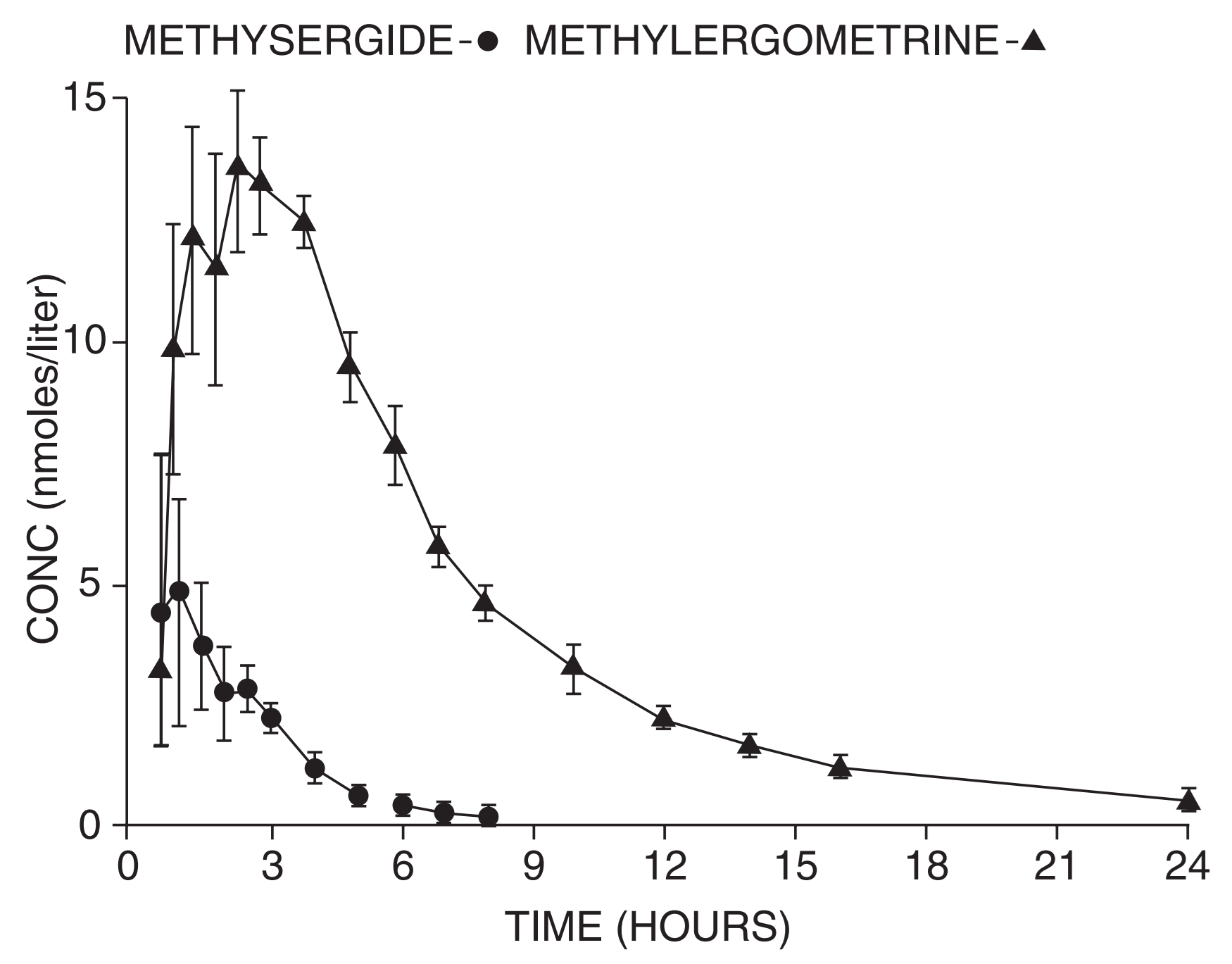
Methysergide and methylergometrine levels after a single 2.7 mg oral dose of methysergide maleate in men.

The oral bioavailability of methysergide is 13% due to high first-pass metabolism into methylergometrine. Methysergide produces methylergonovine as a major active metabolite. Levels of methylergonovine are about 10-fold higher than those of methysergide during methysergide therapy. As such, methysergide may be considered a prodrug of methylergonovine. The elimination half-life of methylergonovine is almost four times as long as that of methysergide.

== Chemistry ==
Methysergide, also known as N-[(2S)-1-hydroxybutan-2-yl]-1,6-dimethyl-9,10-didehydroergoline-8α-carboxamide or N-(1-(hydroxymethyl)propyl)-1-methyl-D-lysergamide, is a derivative of the ergolines and lysergamides and is structurally related to other members of these families, for instance lysergic acid diethylamide (LSD).

=== Analogues ===
A notable derivative of methysergide is D13H (possibly XC101-D13H).

== Natural occurrence ==
Previously thought to be an exclusively synthetic compound, methysergide has been reported to occur naturally in Argyreia nervosa (Hawaiian baby woodrose).

== History ==
Harold Wolff's theory of vasodilation in migraine is well-known. Less known is his search for a perivascular factor that would damage local tissues and increase pain sensitivity during migraine attacks. Serotonin was found to be among the candidate agents to be included. In the same period, serotonin was isolated (1948) and, because of its actions, an anti-serotonin drug was needed.

Methysergide was synthesized from lysergic acid by adding a methyl group and a butanolamid group. This resulted in a compound with selectivity and high potency as a serotonin (5-HT) inhibitor. Based on the possible involvement of serotonin in migraine attacks, it was introduced in 1959 by Sicuteri as a preventive drug for migraine. The clinical effect was often excellent, but 5 years later it was found to cause retroperitoneal fibrosis after chronic intake.

Consequently, the use of the drug in migraine declined considerably, but it was still used as a 5-HT antagonist in experimental studies. In 1974 Saxena showed that methysergide had a selective vasoconstrictor effect in the carotid bed and in 1984 he found an atypical receptor. This finding provided an incentive for the development of sumatriptan.

Novartis withdrew it from the U.S. market after taking over Sandoz, but currently lists it as a discontinued product. United States production of methysergide (Sansert) was discontinued on the manufacturer's own behalf in 2002. Sansert had previously been produced by Sandoz, which merged with Ciba-Geigy in 1996, and led to the creation of Novartis. In 2003 Novartis united its global generics businesses under a single global brand, with the Sandoz name and product line reviewed and reestablished.

== Society and culture ==
=== Recreational use ===
Methysergide produces psychedelic effects at high and supratherapeutic doses in the range of 3.5 to 7.5 mg. Slight psychedelic effects have also been observed with methysergide at therapeutic doses in some individuals.

=== Controversy ===
Methysergide has been an effective treatment for migraine and cluster headache for over 50 years but is said to have been systematically been suppressed from the migraine and cluster headache marketplace for over 15 years due to unqualified risk benefit/ratio safety concerns. Many cite the potential side effects of retroperitoneal and retropulmonary fibrosis as the prime reason methysergide is no longer frequently prescribed, but these complications were documented as early as the mid-1960s.

=== Legal status ===
==== Canada ====
Methysergide is not a controlled substance in Canada as of 2025.

==== United States ====
Methysergide is not an explicitly controlled substance in the United States.

== See also ==
- Substituted lysergamide
- XC101-D13H (XC-101)
