= Lotrifen =

Chemical compound

Clinical data
- Trade names: Canocenta, Privaprol
- Other names: Trazisoquine; L-12717; DL-717-IT

Identifiers
- IUPAC name: 2-(4-chlorophenyl)-[1,2,4]triazolo[5,1-a]isoquinoline
- CAS Number: 66535-86-2
- PubChem CID: 68866
- ChemSpider: 62098
- UNII: K6J75G277H
- ChEMBL: ChEMBL94113
- CompTox Dashboard (EPA): DTXSID6073603
- ECHA InfoCard: 100.060.340

Chemical and physical data
- Formula: C_{16}H_{10}ClN_{3}
- Molar mass: 279.73 g·mol^{−1}
- 3D model (JSmol): Interactive image
- SMILES: C1=CC=C2C(=C1)C=CN3C2=NC(=N3)C4=CC=C(C=C4)Cl
- InChI: InChI=1S/C16H10ClN3/c17-13-7-5-12(6-8-13)15-18-16-14-4-2-1-3-11(14)9-10-20(16)19-15/h1-10H; Key:DGWUVKLBXCWNTA-UHFFFAOYSA-N

Lotrifen (INN), also known as trazisoquine and sold under the brand names Canocenta and Privaprol, is an abortifacient which is used in veterinary medicine. It was described in 1978.

== Synthesis ==

Reaction of the acyl hydrazide (1) and the carboximidate (2) gives compound (3). Heating this in the presence of sodium hydride cyclises this intermediate, forming the 1,2,4-triazole ring system of the drug. Oxidation of (4) with N-bromoacetamide yields lotrifen.
