= Denaverine =

Chemical compound

Clinical data
- AHFS/Drugs.com: International Drug Names
- Pregnancy category: Gr 1 (Germany)
- Routes of administration: intramuscular injection, suppositories
- ATCvet code: QG02CX90 (WHO)

Legal status
- Legal status: In general: ℞ (Prescription only)

Pharmacokinetic data
- Bioavailability: 8% (suppositories), 37% (oral solution)
- Metabolism: mainly hepatic, at least 11 metabolites
- Elimination half-life: 34 hours

Identifiers
- IUPAC name: 2-(Dimethylamino)ethyl (2-ethylbutoxy)diphenylacetate
- CAS Number: 3579-62-2 3321-06-0 (hydrochloride)
- PubChem CID: 71130
- ChemSpider: 64278
- UNII: O14NF38MTL
- KEGG: D07787
- ChEMBL: ChEMBL1614656
- CompTox Dashboard (EPA): DTXSID10189315

Chemical and physical data
- Formula: C_{24}H_{33}NO_{3}
- Molar mass: 383.532 g·mol^{−1}
- 3D model (JSmol): Interactive image
- SMILES: CCC(CC)COC(C1=CC=CC=C1)(C2=CC=CC=C2)C(=O)OCCN(C)C
- InChI: InChI=1S/C24H33NO3/c1-5-20(6-2)19-28-24(21-13-9-7-10-14-21,22-15-11-8-12-16-22)23(26)27-18-17-25(3)4/h7-16,20H,5-6,17-19H2,1-4H3; Key:FPTOUQZVCUIPHY-UHFFFAOYSA-N

Denaverine is an antispasmodic drug. It was developed in Germany and patented in 1974. Denaverine hydrochloride is used in veterinary medicine under the trade name Sensiblex as a muscle relaxant for the myometrium of cows and dogs during parturition. Under the trade name Spasmalgan, it has also been used in humans for the treatment of urogenital and gastrointestinal spasms.

== Mechanism of action ==
Denaverine, like papaverine, acts as a phosphodiesterase inhibitor. Additionally, it has anticholinergic effects.
