= WB-4101 =

Chemical compound

Identifiers
- IUPAC name: 2-(2,6-Dimethoxyphenoxyethyl)aminomethyl-1,4-benzodioxane
- CAS Number: 613-67-2
- PubChem CID: 5685
- IUPHAR/BPS: 499
- ChemSpider: 5483
- UNII: E9H51OIT2B
- CompTox Dashboard (EPA): DTXSID1043885

Chemical and physical data
- Formula: C_{19}H_{23}NO_{5}
- Molar mass: 345.395 g·mol^{−1}
- 3D model (JSmol): Interactive image
- SMILES: COc1cccc(c1OCCNCC2COc3ccccc3O2)OC
- InChI: InChI=1S/C19H23NO5/c1-21-17-8-5-9-18(22-2)19(17)23-11-10-20-12-14-13-24-15-6-3-4-7-16(15)25-14/h3-9,14,20H,10-13H2,1-2H3; Key:GYSZUJHYXCZAKI-UHFFFAOYSA-N

WB-4101 is a compound which acts as an antagonist at the α_{1B}-adrenergic receptor. It was one of the first selective antagonists developed for this receptor and was invented in 1969, but is still commonly used in research into adrenergic receptors, especially, as a lead compound from which to develop more selective drugs.

== See also ==
- Phendioxan
