= Cardiac fibrosis =

Excess deposition of extracellular matrix in the cardiac muscle

Cardiac fibrosis commonly refers to the excess deposition of extracellular matrix in the cardiac muscle, but the term may also refer to an abnormal thickening of the heart valves due to inappropriate proliferation of cardiac fibroblasts. Fibrotic cardiac muscle is stiffer and less compliant, as seen in the progression to heart failure, and prone to cardiac conduction disturbances (which can be heart rate dependent) that may give rise to arrhythmias. The description below focuses on a specific mechanism of valvular pathology but there are other causes of valve pathology and fibrosis of the cardiac muscle.

Fibrocyte cells normally secrete collagen, and function to provide structural support for the heart. When over-activated this process causes thickening and fibrosis of the valve, with white tissue building up primarily on the tricuspid valve, but also occurring on the pulmonary valve. The thickening and loss of flexibility eventually may lead to valvular dysfunction and right-sided heart failure.

== Types ==
Following are types of myocardial fibrosis:

- Interstitial fibrosis, which is unspecific, and has been described in congestive heart failure, hypertension, and normal aging.
- Subepicardial fibrosis, also unspecific, and is associated with non-infarction diagnoses such as myocarditis and non-ischemic cardiomyopathy.
- Replacement fibrosis, which indicates an older infarction.
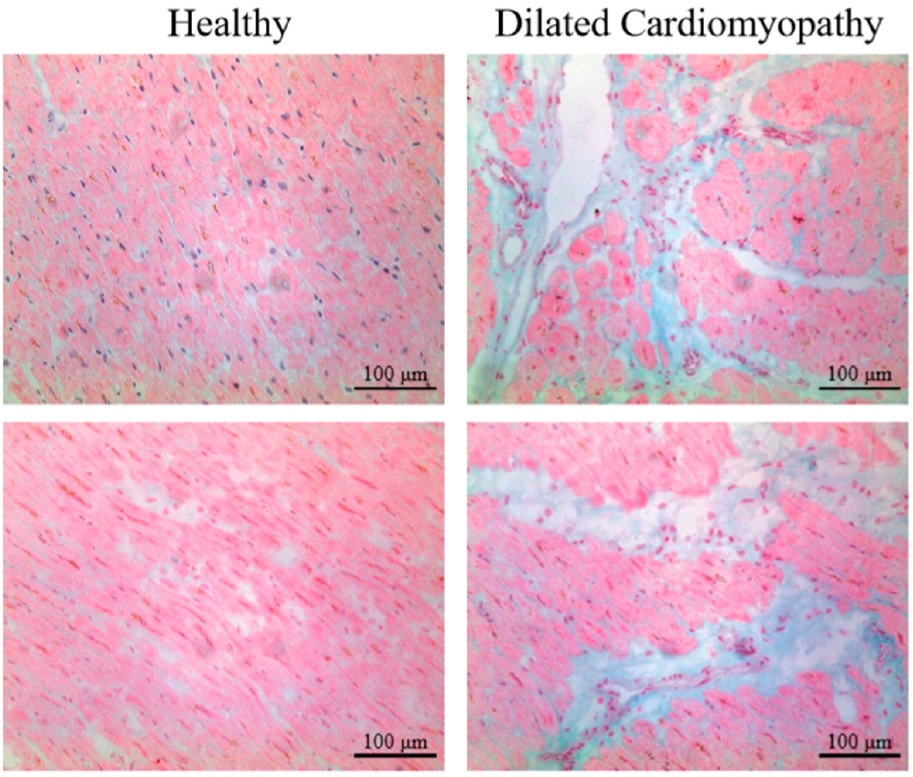
Micrograph of healthy myocardium versus interstitial fibrosis in dilated cardiomyopathy. Alcian blue stain. The fibrosis is either evenly distributed between myocytes or follows anatomic structures such as blood vessels.

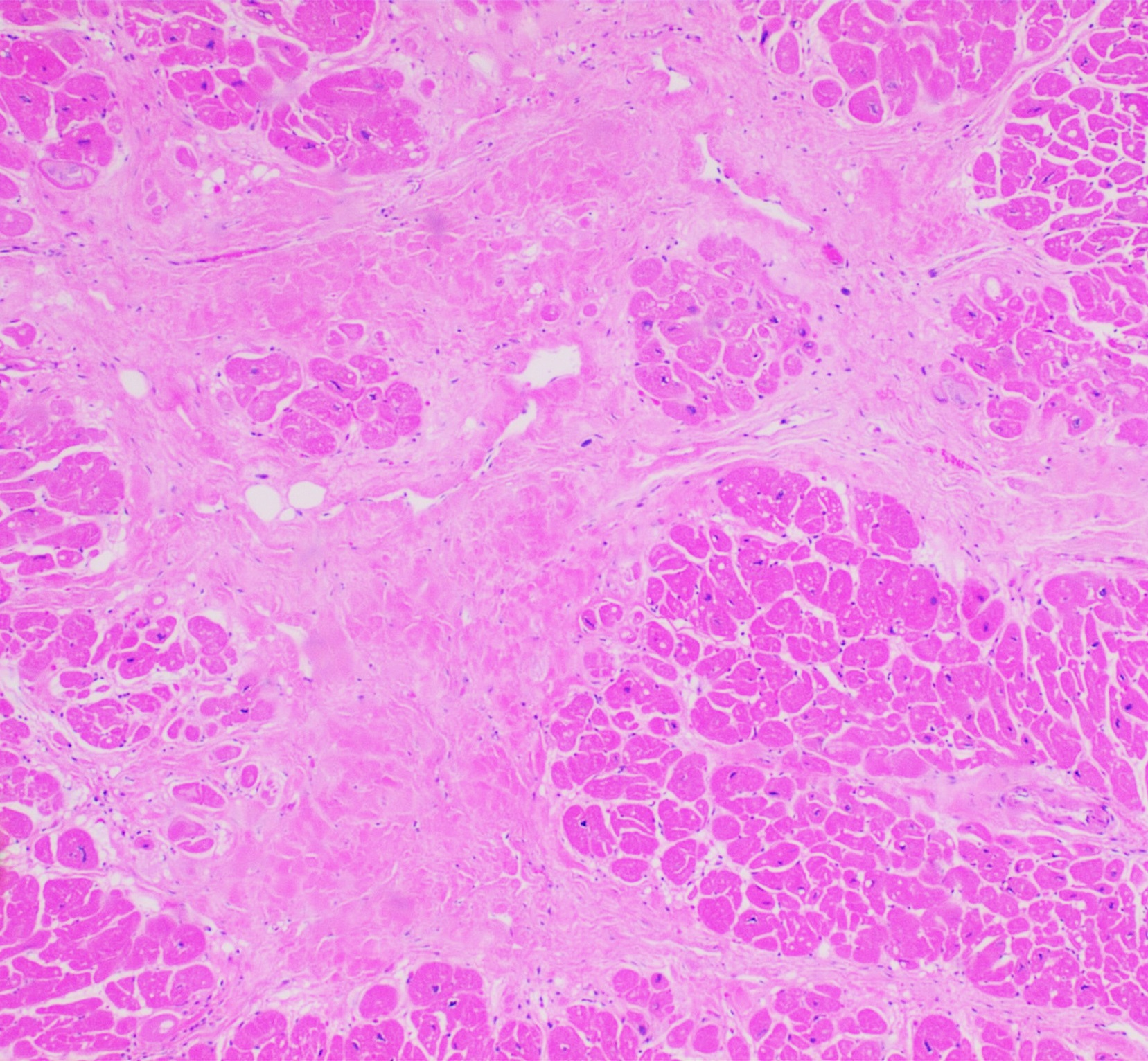
Interstitial fibrosis of chronic ischemic heart disease, H&E stain, with associated relatively well organized myocardial bundles

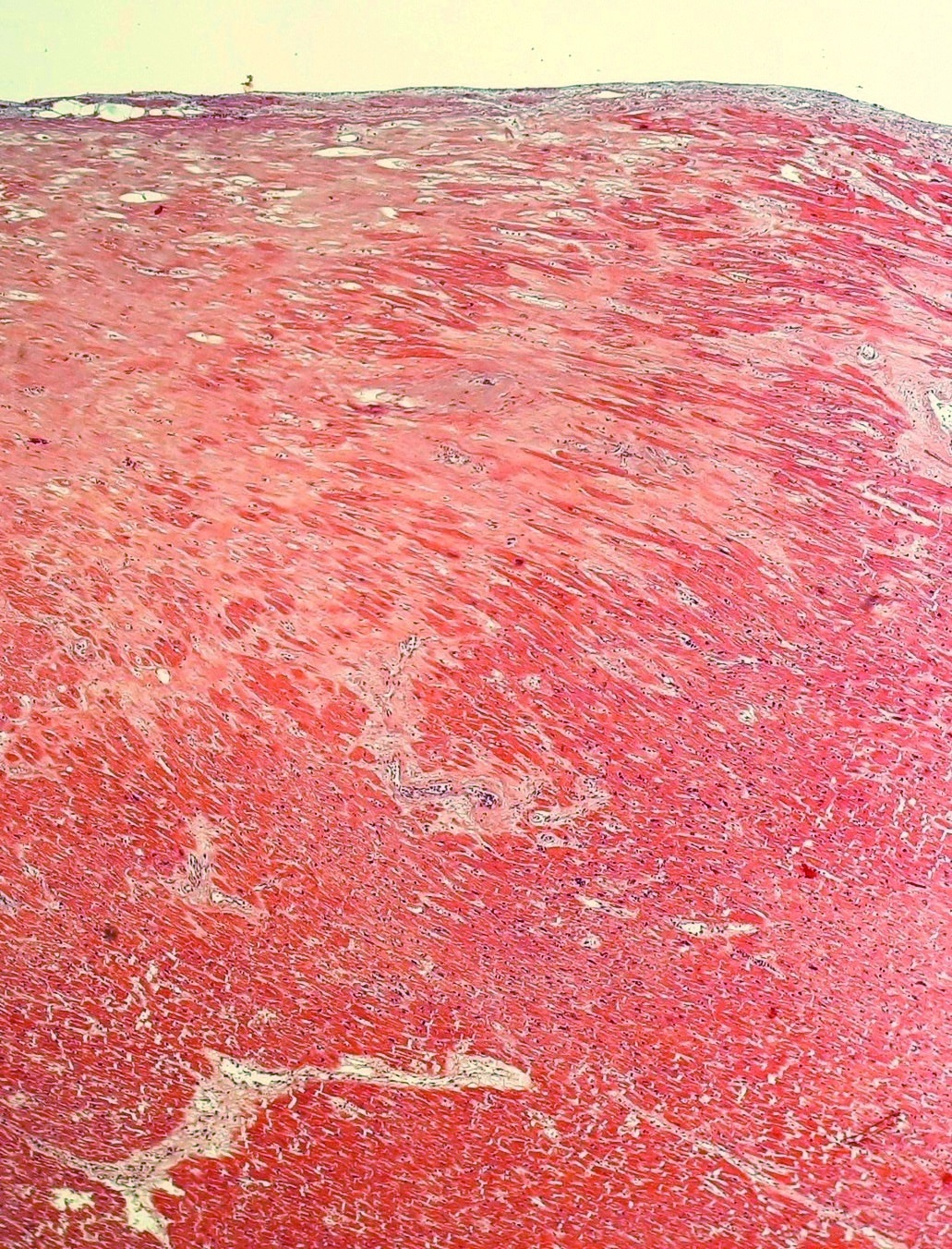
Subepicardial fibrosis (epicardium at top).

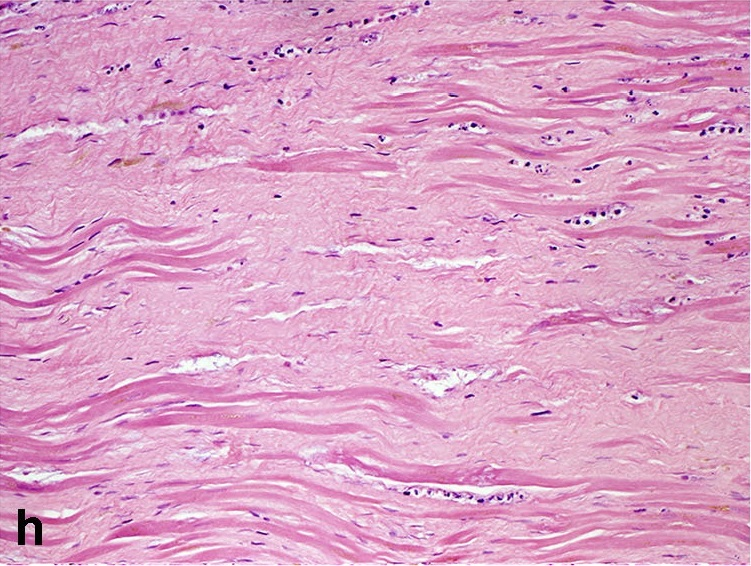
Replacement fibrosis in myocardial infarction, typically being boundless, dense and not conforming to the other types.

== Connection with excess blood serotonin (5-HT) ==
Certain diseases such as neuroendocrine tumor of the small intestine (also known by the obsolete term carcinoid), which sometimes release large amounts of 5-hydroxytryptamine, commonly known as 5-HT or serotonin into the blood, may produce a characteristic pattern of mostly right-sided cardiac fibrosis which can be identified with echocardiography. Cardiac fibrosis is a significant source of morbidity and mortality in patients with functional neuroendocrine tumors. This pathology has also been seen in certain East-African tribes who eat foods (Matoke —a green banana) containing excess amounts of serotonin.

== Connection with direct serotonergic agonist drugs ==
Elevated prevalence of cardiac fibrosis and related valvopathies was found to be associated with use of a number of unrelated drugs following long-term statistical analysis once the drugs had been on the market for some time. The cause of this was unknown at the time, but eventually it was realised that all the implicated drugs acted as agonists at 5-HT_{2B} receptors in the heart in addition to their intended sites of action elsewhere in the body.

The precise mechanisms involved remain elusive however, as while the cardiotoxicity shows some dose–response relationship, it does not always develop, and consistent daily use over an extended period tends to be most strongly predictive of development of valvopathy.

The drugs most classically associated with the condition are weight loss drugs such as fenfluramine and chlorphentermine, and antiparkinson drugs such as pergolide and cabergoline, which are prescribed for chronic use.

The heart valve changes seen with moderate and intermittent use can result in permanent damage and life-threatening heart problems if use of the causative drug is increased or continued, however longitudinal studies of former patients suggest that the damage will heal over time to some extent at least.

=== Anorectics ===
Some appetite suppressant drugs such as fenfluramine (which in combination with phentermine was marketed as Pondimin and commonly referred to as fen-phen), chlorphentermine, and aminorex (along with its analogue 4-Methylaminorex which has seen sporadic use as a recreational drug) induce a similar pattern of cardiac fibrosis (and pulmonary hypertension), apparently by overstimulating 5HT_{2B} receptors on the cardiac fibroblast cells.

These drugs consequently tend to cause increased risk of heart valve damage and subsequent heart failure, which eventually led to them being withdrawn from the market.

=== Antimigraine drugs ===
Certain antimigraine drugs which are targeted at serotonin receptors as vasoconstrictive agents, have long been known to be associated with pulmonary hypertension and Raynaud's phenomenon (both vasoconstrictive effects), as well as retroperitoneal fibrosis (a fibrotic cell/fibrocyte proliferation effect, thought to be similar to cardiac valve fibrosis).

These drugs include ergotamine and methysergide and both drugs can also cause cardiac fibrosis.

=== Antiparkinson drugs ===
Certain antiparkinson drugs, although targeted at dopaminergic receptors, cross-react with serotonergic 5-HT_{2B} receptors as well, and have been reported to cause cardiac fibrosis. These drugs include pergolide and cabergoline.

=== Antihypertensive drugs ===
Guanfacine may be a 5-HT_{2B} agonist, based on the results of theoretical modeling and high-throughput screening.

==== Pergolide ====
Pergolide was an antiparkinson medications that was in decreasing use since reported in 2003 to be associated with cardiac fibrosis. In March 2007, pergolide was withdrawn from the U.S. market due to serious valvular damage that was shown in two independent studies.

==== Cabergoline ====
Like pergolide, cabergoline has been linked to cardiac damage. Among similar antiparkinsonian drugs, cabergoline exhibits the same type of serotonin receptor binding as pergolide. Although lisuride, a related drug, also binds to the 5-HT_{2B} receptor, it acts as an antagonist rather than as an agonist.

In January 2007, cabergoline (Dostinex) was reported also to be associated with valvular proliferation heart damage.

=== Recreational drugs ===
Several serotonergic recreational drugs, including the empathogens MDA and MDMA ("ecstasy"), and some hallucinogens such as DOI and Bromo-DragonFLY, have all been shown to act as 5-HT_{2B} agonists in vitro, but how significant this may be as a risk factor associated with their recreational use is unclear.

The piperazine derivative mCPP (a major metabolite of trazodone) is a 5-HT_{2B} agonist in animal models, but actually behaves as a 5-HT_{2B} antagonist in humans.

==== MDMA ====
One study of human users of MDMA ("ecstasy") found that they did have heart valve changes suggestive of early cardiac fibrosis, which were not present in non-MDMA using controls, suggesting that MDMA use certainly has the potential to cause this kind of heart damage.

On the other hand, there is as yet no statistical evidence to establish or negate significant increases in rates of cardiac valvopathies in current or former MDMA users. Absent studies on point, it may be speculated that as with other 5-HT_{2B} agonists, development of heart valve damage may be dependent on the frequency and duration of use and the total cumulative exposure over time. If that is the case, then the heaviest users are likely to face the greatest risk of heart damage.

== Other serotonergic pharmacologics in question ==
The SSRI antidepressants raise blood serotonin levels, and thus may be capable of the same risks, though it is thought that the risk is substantially lower with such drugs. The amino acid L-tryptophan also raises blood serotonin, and may present the same risk as well; though, again, the risk is considered to be low.

However, the tryptophan derivative 5-HTP (5-hydroxytryptophan), used in the treatment of depression, raises blood serotonin level considerably. It has yet to be reported to be associated with valve disease or other fibrosis, but for the previous theoretical reasons, it has been suggested as a possible danger.

When 5-HTP is used in medicine, it is generally administered along with carbidopa, which prevents the peripheral decarboxylation of 5-HTP to serotonin and so ensures that only brain serotonin levels are increased without producing peripheral side effects, however 5-HTP is also sold without carbidopa as a dietary supplement, and may have increased risks when taken by itself without carbidopa.

== In non-human great apes ==
Cardiac fibrosis is common in non-human great apes in human care. The term idiopathic myocardial fibrosis was coined to emphasize this disease is likely different from the above described forms of cardiac fibrosis in humans. The etiology is not known, though vitamin D deficiency is a potential suspected cause at least in chimpanzees.

== Possible treatments ==
The most obvious treatment for cardiac valve fibrosis or fibrosis in other locations, consists of stopping the stimulatory drug or production of serotonin. In the case of a functional neuroendocrine tumor, somatostatin analogs such as octreotide are used to reduce the production of serotonin by tumor cells, which often highly express inhibitory somatostatin receptors.

Surgical tricuspid valve replacement, sometimes combined with a pulmonary valve replacement, can be necessary in some patients.

A compound found in red wine, resveratrol has been found to slow the development of cardiac fibrosis. More sophisticated approaches of countering cardiac fibrosis like microRNA inhibition (miR-21, for example) are being tested in animal models.
