= Alpha-1A adrenergic receptor =

Protein-coding gene in the species Homo sapiens

ADRA1A
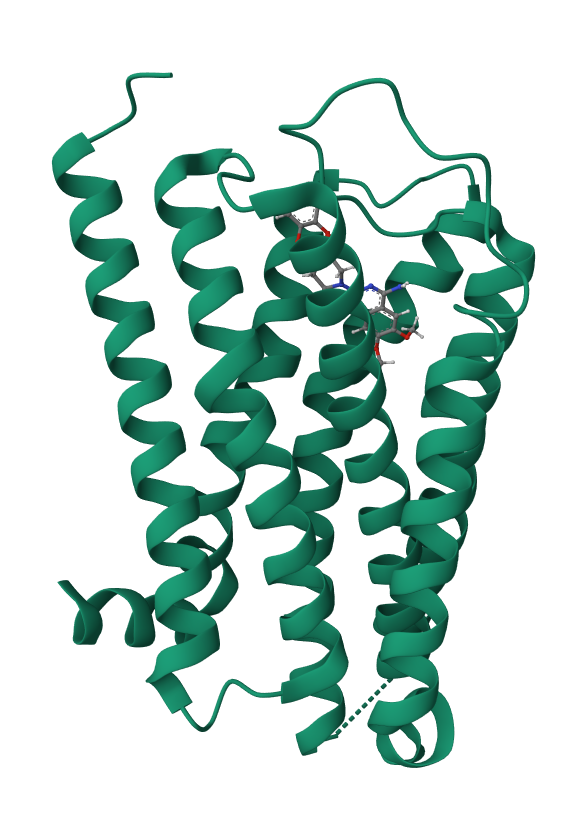

Identifiers
- Aliases: ADRA1A, ADRA1C, ADRA1L1, ALPHA1AAR, adrenoceptor alpha 1A
- External IDs: OMIM: 104221; MGI: 104773; HomoloGene: 68078; GeneCards: ADRA1A; OMA:ADRA1A - orthologs

Gene location (Human)
Chr.	Chromosome 8 (human)
Band	8p21.2	Start	26,748,150 bp
Band	8p21.2	End	26,867,278 bp

Gene location (Mouse)
Chr.	Chromosome 14 (mouse)
Band	14|14 D1	Start	66,872,700 bp
Band	14|14 D1	End	67,008,617 bp
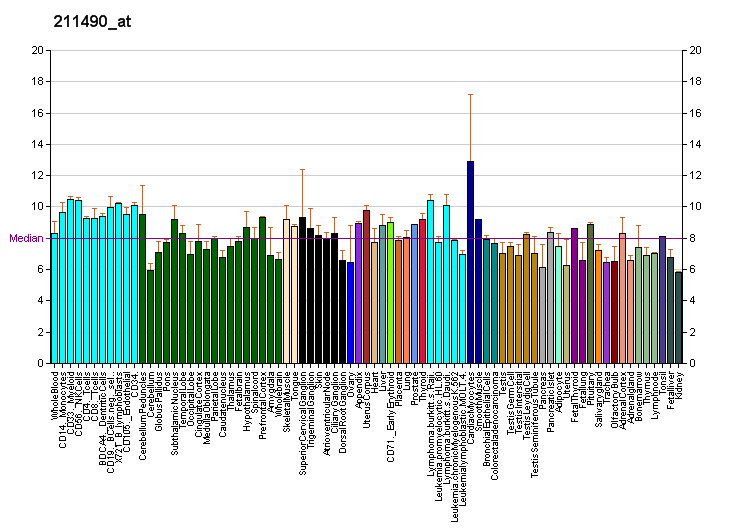

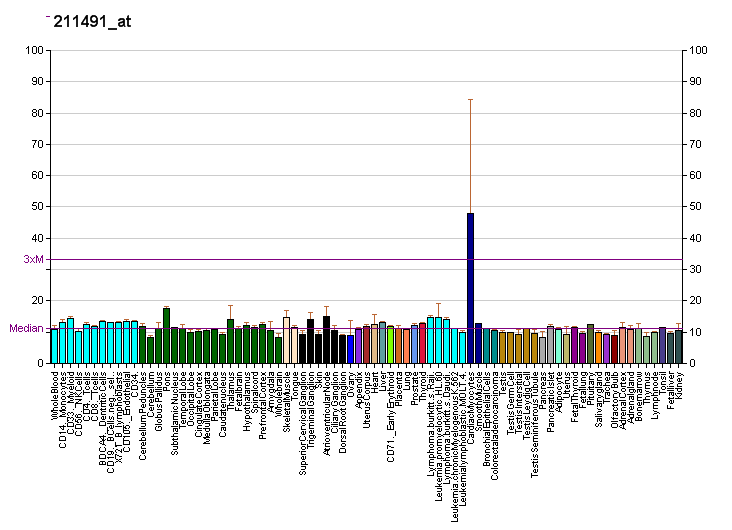

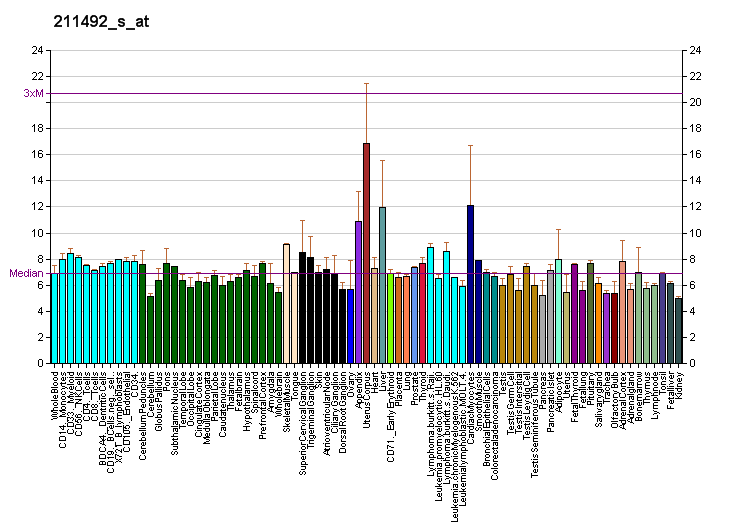
RNA expression pattern
Bgee	Human / Mouse (ortholog); Top expressed in: right lobe of liver; buccal mucosa cell; right lung; apex of heart; left ventricle; right ventricle; testicle; tail of epididymis; upper lobe of left lung; spleen / Top expressed in: right kidney; superior frontal gyrus; primary visual cortex; dentate gyrus of hippocampal formation granule cell; muscle of thigh; brown adipose tissue; supraoptic nucleus; cerebellar cortex; ventricular zone; neural tube; More reference expression data
BioGPS	More reference expression data
Gene ontology
Molecular function	signal transducer activity; adrenergic receptor activity; protein heterodimerization activity; G protein-coupled receptor activity; alpha1-adrenergic receptor activity; protein binding
Cellular component	T-tubule; nuclear membrane; integral component of membrane; nucleus; integral component of plasma membrane; membrane; Z discdkac; plasma membrane; cytoplasm; caveola; dopaminergic synapse; glutamatergic synapse; GABA-ergic synapse; integral component of postsynaptic membrane; integral component of presynaptic membrane
Biological process	positive regulation of cardiac muscle contraction; negative regulation of cell population proliferation; response to hormone; norepinephrine-epinephrine vasoconstriction involved in regulation of systemic arterial blood pressure; positive regulation of MAPK cascade; intracellular signal transduction; positive regulation of ERK1 and ERK2 cascade; signal transduction; organ growth; cell-cell signaling; positive regulation of smooth muscle contraction; activation of phospholipase C activity; pilomotor reflex; regulation of vasoconstriction; positive regulation of heart rate; positive regulation of synaptic transmission, GABAergic; positive regulation of systemic arterial blood pressure; G protein-coupled receptor signaling pathway; urination; calcium ion transport into cytosol; positive regulation of action potential; positive regulation of the force of heart contraction by epinephrine-norepinephrine; apoptotic process; smooth muscle contraction; phospholipase C-activating G protein-coupled receptor signaling pathway; adenylate cyclase-activating adrenergic receptor signaling pathway; ageing; regulation of cardiac muscle contraction; positive regulation of heart rate by epinephrine-norepinephrine; positive regulation of protein kinase C signaling; negative regulation of Rho protein signal transduction; regulation of muscle contraction; adult heart development; negative regulation of heart rate involved in baroreceptor response to increased systemic arterial blood pressure; positive regulation of cytosolic calcium ion concentration; positive regulation of vasoconstriction; negative regulation of autophagy; positive regulation of cardiac muscle hypertrophy; positive regulation of non-membrane spanning protein tyrosine kinase activity; cell growth involved in cardiac muscle cell development; regulation of synaptic vesicle exocytosis; adenylate cyclase-modulating G protein-coupled receptor signaling pathway; neuron-glial cell signaling
Sources:Amigo / QuickGO
Orthologs
Species	Human	Mouse
Entrez	148	11549
Ensembl	ENSG00000120907	ENSMUSG00000045875
UniProt	P35348	P97718
RefSeq (mRNA)	NM_000680; NM_033302; NM_033303; NM_033304; NM_001322502 NM_001322503; NM_001322504	NM_001271759; NM_001271760; NM_001271761; NM_013461
RefSeq (protein)	NP_000671; NP_001309431; NP_001309432; NP_001309433; NP_150645 NP_150646; NP_150647	NP_001258688; NP_001258689; NP_001258690; NP_038489
Location (UCSC)	Chr 8: 26.75 – 26.87 Mb	Chr 14: 66.87 – 67.01 Mb
PubMed search
- Wikidata
View/Edit Human	View/Edit Mouse

The alpha-1A adrenergic receptor (α_{1A} adrenoreceptor), also known as ADRA1A, formerly known also as the alpha-1C adrenergic receptor, is an alpha-1 adrenergic receptor, and also denotes the human gene encoding it. There is no longer a subtype α_{1C} receptor. At one time, there was a subtype known as α_{1C}, but it was found to be identical to the previously discovered α_{1A} receptor subtype. To avoid confusion, the naming convention was continued with the letter D.

== Receptor ==
There are 3 alpha-1 adrenergic receptor subtypes: alpha-1A, -1B and -1D, all of which signal through the Gq/11 family of G-proteins. Different subtypes show different patterns of activation. The majority of alpha-1 receptors are directed toward the function of epinephrine, a hormone that has to do with the fight-or-flight response.

== Gene ==
This gene encodes the alpha-1A-adrenergic receptor. Alternative splicing of this gene generates four transcript variants, which encode four different isoforms with distinct C-termini but having similar ligand binding properties.

== Ligands ==
=== Agonists ===
- 6-(5-fluoro-2-pyrimidin-5-yl-phenyl)-6,7-dihydro-5H-pyrrolo[1,2-a]imidazole: EC_{50} = 1nM, E_{max} = 65%; good selectivity over α1B, α1D and α2A subtypes
- further partial agonistic imidazole compounds
- A-61603
- Metaraminol

=== Antagonists ===
- Tamsulosin: for treatment of benign prostatic hyperplasia
- Silodosin: for treatment of benign prostatic hyperplasia
- Doxazosin: for treatment of benign prostatic hyperplasia and/or Hypertension
- Risperidone: used to treat schizophrenia and bipolar disorder
- WB-4101
- Aripiprazole
- Ziprasidone
- Nicergoline
- Most tricyclic antidepressants

== Role in neural circuits ==
α1A-adrenergic receptor subtypes increase inhibition at dendrodendritic synapses, suggesting a synaptic mechanism for noradrenergic modulation of olfactory driven behaviors.

== See also ==
- Adrenergic receptor
