= 5-HT receptor =

Class of transmembrane proteins

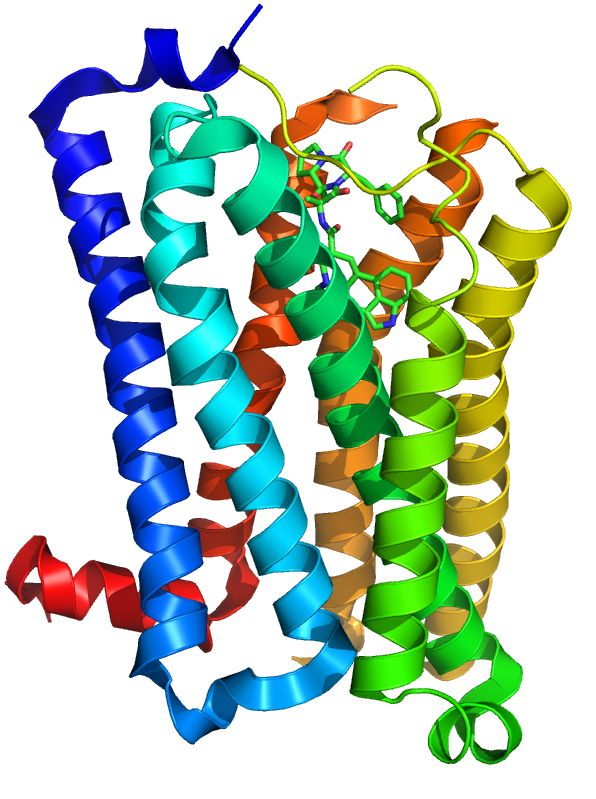
The 5-HT_{1B} receptor as an example of a metabotropic serotonin receptor. Its crystallographic structure in ribbon representation

5-HT receptors, 5-hydroxytryptamine receptors, or serotonin receptors, are a group of G protein-coupled receptor and ligand-gated ion channels found in multiple tissues including the central and peripheral nervous systems. They mediate both excitatory and inhibitory neurotransmission. The serotonin (i.e., 5-hydroxytryptamine, hence "5-HT") receptors are activated by the neurotransmitter serotonin, which acts as their natural ligand.

The serotonin receptors modulate the release of many neurotransmitters, including glutamate, GABA, dopamine, epinephrine / norepinephrine, and acetylcholine, as well as many hormones, including oxytocin, prolactin, vasopressin, cortisol, corticotropin, and substance P, among others. Serotonin receptors influence various biological and neurological processes such as aggression, anxiety, appetite, cognition, learning, memory, mood, nausea, sleep, and thermoregulation. The serotonin receptors also affect sexual behaviors and increases in serotonin can cause increases of sexual stimulation. They are the target of a variety of pharmaceutical and recreational drugs, including many antidepressants, antipsychotics, anorectics, antiemetics, gastroprokinetic agents, antimigraine agents, psychedelics (hallucinogens), and entactogens. In cases of certain recreational drugs, such as crack cocaine, their use has been shown to negatively impact the response of 5HT receptors in the brain.

Serotonin receptors are found in almost all animals and are even known to regulate longevity and behavioural aging in the primitive nematode, Caenorhabditis elegans.

== Classification ==
5-hydroxytryptamine receptors or 5-HT receptors, or serotonin receptors are found in the central and peripheral nervous systems. They can be divided into 7 families of G protein-coupled receptors which activate an intracellular second messenger cascade to produce an excitatory or inhibitory response. The exception to this is the 5-HT_{3} receptor which is a ligand-gated ion channel. In 2014, a novel 5-HT receptor was isolated from the small white butterfly, Pieris rapae, and named pr5-HT_{8}. It does not occur in mammals and shares relatively low similarity to the known 5-HT receptor classes.

=== Families ===
Family	Type	Mechanism	Potential
5-HT_{1}	G_{i}/G_{o}-protein coupled.	Decreasing cellular levels of cAMP.	Inhibitory
5-HT_{2}	G_{q}/G_{11}-protein coupled.	Increasing cellular levels of IP_{3} and DAG.	Excitatory
5-HT_{3}	Ligand-gated Na^{+} and K^{+} cation channel.	Depolarizing plasma membrane.	Excitatory
5-HT_{4}	G_{s}-protein coupled.	Increasing cellular levels of cAMP.	Excitatory
5-HT_{5}	G_{i}/G_{o}-protein coupled.	Decreasing cellular levels of cAMP.	Inhibitory
5-HT_{6}	G_{s}-protein coupled.	Increasing cellular levels of cAMP.	Excitatory
5-HT_{7}	G_{s}-protein coupled.	Increasing cellular levels of cAMP.	Excitatory

=== Subtypes ===
The 7 general serotonin receptor classes include a total of 14 known serotonin receptors. The 15th receptor 5-HT_{1P} has been distinguished on the basis of functional and radioligand binding studies, its existence has never been definitely affirmed or refuted. The specific types have been characterized as follows:

Information on serotonin receptors (human isoforms if nothing else is stated)
Receptor	First cloned – PDB entries	Gene(s)	Distribution						Function	Agonists	Antagonists	Uses of drugs that act on this receptor
Receptor	First cloned – PDB entries	Gene(s)	Blood vessels	CNS	GI Tract	Platelets	PNS	Smooth Muscle	Function	Agonists	Antagonists	Uses of drugs that act on this receptor
5-HT_{1A}	1987 –: 7e2x; 7e2y; 7e2z	HTR1A	Yes	Yes	No	No	No	No	Addiction; Aggression; Anxiety; Appetite; Autoreceptor; Blood Pressure; Cardiovascular Function; Emesis; Heart Rate; Impulsivity; Memory; Mood; Nausea; Nociception; Penile Erection; Pupil Dilation; Respiration; Sexual Behavior; Sleep; Sociability; Thermoregulation; Vasoconstriction	Selective (for 5-HT_{1A} over other 5-HT receptors): Vilazodone (Viibryd); F-15,599 (research compound, highly potent and selective for 5-HT_{1A}); Flesinoxan (potent, EC_{50} = 24 nM); Gepirone (partial agonist, K_{i} = 70 nM); Haloperidol; Ipsapirone (partial agonist, K_{i} = 12.1 nM); Quetiapine; Trazodone (SARI, selective in the sense that on all other 5-HT receptors it acts as either an antagonist or has no action. K_{d} = 78 nM); Yohimbine (unselective partial agonist); Tandospirone (potent and selective partial agonist); Nonselective: 5-CT (potent – K_{i} = 250 ± 50 pM); 8-OH-DPAT (potent); Aripiprazole (atypical antipsychotic); Asenapine (atypical antipsychotic); Buspirone (partial agonist); Vortioxetine (high-efficacy partial agonist); Ziprasidone (partial agonist, K_{i} = 3.4 nM); Methylphenidate (weak agonist)	BMY 7378; Cyanopindolol; Iodocyanopindolol; Lecozotan; Methiothepin; Methysergide; NAN-190; Nebivolol; Nefazodone; WAY-100,135; WAY-100,635; Mefway	Analgesics (agonists); Antidepressants (post-synaptic receptor agonists and pre-synaptic autoreceptor antagonists serve as antidepressants); Anxiolytics (agonist and antagonist)
5-HT_{1B}	1992 –: 6g79	HTR1B	Yes	Yes	No	No	No	No	Addiction; Aggression; Anxiety; Autoreceptor; Learning; Locomotion; Memory; Mood; Penile Erection; Sexual Behavior; Vasoconstriction	5-CT; CGS-12066A; CP-93,129; CP-94,253; Dihydroergotamine; Eltoprazine; Ergotamine; Methysergide; RU 24969; TFMPP; Triptans (antimigraine); Zolmitriptan; Eletriptan; Sumatriptan; Vortioxetine (partial agonist, K_{i} = 33 nM)	Alprenolol; AR-A000002; Asenapine; Cyanopindolol; GR-127,935; Iodocyanopindolol; Isamoltane; Metergoline; Methiothepin; Oxprenolol; Pindolol; Propranolol; SB-216,641; Yohimbine	Migraines (e.g., triptans)
5-HT_{1D}	1991 –: 7e32	HTR1D	Yes	Yes	No	No	No	No	Anxiety; Autoreceptor; Locomotion; Vasoconstriction	5-CT; CP-135,807; Dihydroergotamine; Ergotamine; Methysergide; Triptans (antimigraine); Almotriptan; Eletriptan; Frovatriptan; Naratriptan; Rizatriptan; Sumatriptan; Zolmitriptan; Yohimbine	BRL-15572; GR-127,935; Ketanserin; Metergoline; Methiothepin; Rauwolscine; Ritanserin; Vortioxetine (K_{i} = 54 nM); Ziprasidone	Migraines (e.g., triptans)
5-HT_{1E}	1992 –: 7e33	HTR1E	Yes	Yes	No	No	No	No		BRL-54443		None known
5-HT_{1F}	1993 –: 7exd	HTR1F	No	Yes	No	No	No	No	Migraine	BRL-54443; Lasmiditan; LY-334,370; Naratriptan; Eletriptan		None known
5-HT_{1P}	Not cloned		No	No	Yes	No	No	No	Peristalsis	5-OHIP; 2-Methyl-5-HT; 5-BOHIP	5-HTP-DP	None known
5-HT_{2A}	1988	HTR2A	Yes	Yes	Yes	Yes	Yes	Yes	Addiction (potentially modulating); Anxiety; Appetite; Cognition; Imagination; Learning; Memory; Mood; Perception; Sexual Behavior; Sleep; Thermoregulation; Vasoconstriction	25I-NBOMe (Full agonist); 2C-B; 2C-I; 5-MeO-DMT; Aripiprazole (very weak partial agonist or antagonist); BZP; Bufotenin; DMT; DOM; Ergonovine; Lisuride; LSD; Mescaline; PNU-22394 (partial agonist); Psilocin; Psilocybin; TFMPP (partial agonist or antagonist)	Atypical antipsychotics; Clozapine; Olanzapine; Quetiapine; Risperidone; Ziprasidone; Asenapine; Amitriptyline; Clomipramine; Cyproheptadine; Doxepin; Eplivanserin; Etoperidone; Haloperidol; Hydroxyzine; Iloperidone; Ketanserin (antihypertensive); Methysergide; Mianserin; Mirtazapine; Nefazodone; Pimavanserin; Pizotifen; Ritanserin; Trazodone; Yohimbine	Atypical antipsychotics (antagonist); Psychedelics (agonists); NaSSAs (antidepressants and anxiolytics; they serve as antagonists at this site); Treating serotonin syndrome (antagonists; e.g., cyproheptadine); Sleeping aid (antagonists; e.g., trazodone)
5-HT_{2B}	1992	HTR2B	Yes	Yes	Yes	Yes	Yes	Yes	Anxiety; Appetite; Cardiovascular Function; GI Motility; Sleep; Vasoconstriction	6-APB (full agonist); BW-723C86; Fenfluramine; MDMA; Norfenfluramine; PNU-22394 (partial agonist); Ro60-0175; Methylphenidate (weak agonist)	Agomelatine; Asenapine; BZP; Ketanserin; Methysergide; Ritanserin; RS-127,445; Tegaserod; Yohimbine	Migraines (antagonists)
5-HT_{2C}	1988	HTR2C	Yes	Yes	Yes	Yes	Yes	Yes	Addiction (potentially modulating); Anxiety; Appetite; GI Motility; Heteroreceptor for norepinephrine and dopamine; Locomotion; Mood; Penile Erection; Sexual Behavior; Sleep; Thermoregulation; Vasoconstriction	2C-B (partial agonist); A-372,159; AL-38022A; Aripiprazole; Ergonovine; Lorcaserin; PNU-22394 (full agonist); Ro60-0175; TFMPP; Trazodone (hypnotic); YM-348	Agomelatine (antidepressant); Amitriptyline; Asenapine; Clomipramine; Clozapine (antipsychotic); Cyproheptadine; Dimebolin; Eltoprazine; Etoperidone; Fluoxetine; Haloperidol; Iloperidone; Ketanserin (antihypertensive); Lisuride; Methysergide; Mianserin; Mirtazapine; Nefazodone; Olanzapine; Paroxetine; Quetiapine; Risperidone; Ritanserin; SB-242084; Tramadol; Trazodone; Ziprasidone	Antidepressant (antagonists; e.g., agomelatine, fluoxetine, mirtazapine); Orexigenic (e.g., mirtazapine, clozapine and olanzapine; antagonists); Anorectic (Lorcaserin; agonist); Antipsychotic (Vabicaserin; agonists)
5-HT_{3}	1993	HTR3A; HTR3B; HTR3C; HTR3D; HTR3E	No	Yes	Yes	No	Yes	No	Addiction; Anxiety; Emesis; GI Motility; Learning; Memory; Nausea	2-Methyl-5-HT; BZP; Quipazine; RS-56812	Alosetron; Several antiemetics; Dolasetron; Ondansetron; Granisetron; Tropisetron; Clozapine; Memantine; Metoclopramide; Mianserin; Mirtazapine; Olanzapine; Quetiapine; Vortioxetine (K_{i} = 3.7 nM)	Antiemetic; Antidepressant (e.g., mirtazpine); antipsychotic (e.g., olanzapine, quetiapine)
5-HT_{4}	1995	HTR4	No	Yes	Yes	No	Yes	No	Anxiety; Appetite; GI Motility; Learning; Memory; Mood; Respiration	5-MT; BIMU-8; Cinitapride; Cisapride (gastroprokinetic); Dazopride; Metoclopramide; Mosapride; Prucalopride; RS-67333; Renzapride; Tegaserod; Zacopride	L-Lysine; Piboserod	Gastroprokinetics (e.g., Tegaserod)
5-HT_{5A}	1994: 7UM4; 7UM5; 7UM6; 7UM7	HTR5A	No	Yes	No	No	No	No	Autoreceptor; Locomotion; Sleep	5-CT; Ergotamine; Lisuride (partial); Methylergometrine (full); Valerenic Acid (partial agonist)	Asenapine; Dimebolin; Methiothepin; Ritanserin; SB-699,551; SB-699,551-A; MS112	None thus far
5-HT_{5B}	1993	HTR5BP	No	No	No	No	No	No	Functions in rodents, pseudogene in humans			None thus far
5-HT_{6}	1993	HTR6	No	Yes	No	No	No	No	Anxiety; Cognition; Learning; Memory; Mood	EMD-386,088; EMDT; WAY-181,187; WAY-208,466; E-6837; N-(inden-5-yl)imidazothiazole-5-sulfonamide (43)	Amitriptyline; Aripiprazole; Asenapine; Clomipramine; Clozapine; Dimebolin; EGIS-12233; Haloperidol; Iloperidone; MS-245; Olanzapine; Ro04-6790; SB-258,585; SB-271,046; SB-357,134; SB-399,885	Antidepressant (antagonists and agonists); Anxiolytic (antagonists and agonist); Nootropic (antagonists); Anorectic (antagonists)
5-HT_{7}	1993	HTR7	Yes	Yes	Yes	No	No	No	Anxiety; Autoreceptor; Memory; Mood; Respiration; Sleep; Thermoregulation; Vasoconstriction; Immunostimulation	5-CT; 8-OH-DPAT; Aripiprazole (partial agonist); AS-19; E-55888	Amitriptyline; Asenapine; Clomipramine; Clozapine; EGIS-12233; Haloperidol; Iloperidone; Imipramine; Ketanserin; Mirtazapine; Olanzapine; RA-7; Ritanserin; Risperidone; SB-269,970; Vortioxetine (K_{i} = 19 nM)	Antidepressant (antagonists); Anxiolytics (antagonists); Nootropic (antagonists)

Note that there is no 5-HT_{1C} receptor since, after the receptor was cloned and further characterized, it was found to have more in common with the 5-HT_{2} family of receptors and was redesignated as the 5-HT_{2C} receptor.

Very nonselective agonists of 5-HT receptor subtypes include ergotamine (an antimigraine), which activates 5-HT_{1A}, 5-HT_{1D}, 5-HT_{1B}, D_{2} and norepinephrine receptors. LSD (a psychedelic) is a 5-HT_{1A}, 5-HT_{2A}, 5-HT_{2C}, 5-HT_{5A} and 5-HT_{6} agonist.

== Expression patterns ==
The genes coding for serotonin receptors are expressed across the mammalian brain. Genes coding for different receptors types follow different developmental curves. Specifically, there is a developmental increase of HTR5A expression in several subregions of the human cortex, paralleled by a decreased expression of HTR1A from the embryonic period to the post-natal one.

== 5-HT_{1}-like ==
A number of receptors were classed as "5-HT_{1}-like" - by 1998 it was being argued that, since these receptors were "a heterogeneous population of 5-HT1B, 5-HT1D and 5-HT7" receptors the classification was redundant.
