= AVN-322 =

Names
- IUPAC name 5-(benzenesulfonyl)-N,11-dimethyl-2,3,7,11-tetrazatricyclo[7.4.0.02,6]trideca-1(9),3,5,7-tetraen-4-amine;hydrochloride
- Other names List: 1194574-68-9; SB17475; 5-(Benzenesulfonyl)-N,11-dimethyl-2,3,7,11-tetraazatricyclo(7.4.0.0(2,6))trideca-1(9),3,5,7-tetraen-4-amine hydrochloride; starbld0039763

Identifiers
CAS Number	hydrochloride: 1194574-68-9; free base: 1194574-33-8
3D model (JSmol)	hydrochloride: Interactive image; free base: Interactive image
ChEMBL	free base: ChEMBL2172186
ChemSpider	hydrochloride: 68027889
PubChem CID	hydrochloride: 135905417; free base: 44476436
UNII	hydrochloride: B7DM6S48B2
- InChI: hydrochloride: InChI=1S/C17H19N5O2S.ClH/c1-18-16-15(25(23,24)13-6-4-3-5-7-13)17-19-10-12-11-21(2)9-8-14(12)22(17)20-16;/h3-7,10H,8-9,11H2,1-2H3,(H,18,20);1H Key: HLQZXWFRTGIZIJ-UHFFFAOYSA-N; free base: InChI=1S/C17H19N5O2S/c1-18-16-15(25(23,24)13-6-4-3-5-7-13)17-19-10-12-11-21(2)9-8-14(12)22(17)20-16/h3-7,10H,8-9,11H2,1-2H3,(H,18,20) Key: OSHBEPOEBKFEEK-UHFFFAOYSA-N
- SMILES: hydrochloride: CNC1=NN2C3=C(CN(CC3)C)C=NC2=C1S(=O)(=O)C4=CC=CC=C4.Cl; free base: CNC1=NN2C3=C(CN(CC3)C)C=NC2=C1S(=O)(=O)C4=CC=CC=C4

Properties
Chemical formula	C_{17}H_{20}ClN_{5}O_{2}S
Molar mass	393.891 g/mol
- Except where otherwise noted, data are given for materials in their standard state (at 25 °C [77 °F], 100 kPa). Infobox references

AVN-322 is a 5-hydroxytryptamine subtype 6 receptor antagonist manufactured by Avineuro Pharmaceuticals Inc. that could potentially be used to combat Alzheimer's disease and schizophrenia. AVN-322 also reverses the negative effects of scopolamine and MK-80.

The compound is a sister drug to AVN-101 and AVN-211, two similar compounds under trial for treating Alzheimer's. Phase I trials for the drug were initiated in 2009 by Avineuro, and completed in the spring of 2010. The trials showed that AVN-322 was tolerated in a range of doses without any adverse effects, and Avineuro released plans to commence Phase II trials later the same year. The plan for further trials was discontinued in 2013.
