= Epix Pharmaceuticals =

American pharmaceutical company

Epix Pharmaceuticals Inc. (formerly Predix Pharmaceuticals Inc.) was a pharmaceutical company based in Lexington, Massachusetts.

Its products included the following agents:

- PRX-00023—5-HT_{1A} receptor full agonist (later discovered to be an antagonist): for major depression and generalized anxiety disorder
- PRX-03140—5-HT_{4} receptor partial agonist: for Alzheimer's disease
- PRX-07034—5-HT_{6} receptor antagonist: for obesity and cognitive impairment associated with Alzheimer's disease and schizophrenia
- PRX-08066—5-HT_{2B} receptor antagonist: for pulmonary hypertension associated with chronic obstructive pulmonary disease

As of July 2009, the company was in the process of asset liquidation due to insufficient funds to stay afloat.
