= ASP5736 =

Identifiers
- IUPAC name: N-(diaminomethylidene)-1-(2,6-difluorophenyl)-4-fluoroisoquinoline-7-carboxamide
- CAS Number: 1264206-74-7
- PubChem CID: 50923443
- ChemSpider: 58951462
- ChEMBL: ChEMBL3644528

Chemical and physical data
- Formula: C_{17}H_{11}F_{3}N_{4}O
- Molar mass: 344.297 g·mol^{−1}
- 3D model (JSmol): Interactive image
- SMILES: C1=CC(=C(C(=C1)F)C2=NC=C(C3=C2C=C(C=C3)C(=O)N=C(N)N)F)F
- InChI: InChI=1S/C17H11F3N4O/c18-11-2-1-3-12(19)14(11)15-10-6-8(16(25)24-17(21)22)4-5-9(10)13(20)7-23-15/h1-7H,(H4,21,22,24,25); Key:NPYWVXJXMOTDHT-UHFFFAOYSA-N

ASP5736 is an experimental drug developed by Astellas Pharma, which acts as a selective antagonist for the serotonin receptor 5-HT_{5A}, with significantly higher potency than the older drug SB-699,551. In animal studies, it was found to reduce drug appropriate responding produced by LSD, but not DOI, and has also been found to reduce the cognitive dysfunction and memory deficits produced by scopolamine in animal studies, which has been suggested may indicate a potential role for 5-HT_{5A} antagonists in the treatment of schizophrenia, as well as other conditions such as fragile X syndrome.

== See also ==
- AS2674723
