= C16H21N3O2 =

The molecular formula C_{16}H_{21}N_{3}O_{2} may refer to:

- Zolmitriptan, a triptan used in the acute treatment of migraine attacks
- Cyanopindolol, a drug related to pindolol which acts as both a β_{1} adrenoceptor antagonist and a 5-HT_{1A} receptor antagonist
