= C21H24N2 =

The molecular formula C_{21}H_{24}N_{2} (molar mass: 304.43 g/mol, exact mass: 304.1939 u) may refer to:

- AVN-101
- IMes
- Quinupramine
