= C19H22N2O3S =

The molecular formula C_{19}H_{22}N_{2}O_{3}S (molar mass: 358.46 g/mol, exact mass: 358.1351 u) may refer to:

- Dimethoxanate
- MS-245
