= PRX-03140 =

Chemical compound

Clinical data
- ATC code: None

Identifiers
- IUPAC name: 4-hydroxy-7-isopropyl-6-oxo-N-[3-(1-piperidinyl)propyl]-6,7-dihydrothieno[2,3-b]pyridine-5-carboxamide
- CAS Number: 869493-21-0
- PubChem CID: 54677674
- ChemSpider: 21377738
- UNII: 7QGN8QXG7I
- CompTox Dashboard (EPA): DTXSID90236013

Chemical and physical data
- Formula: C_{19}H_{27}N_{3}O_{3}S
- Molar mass: 377.50 g·mol^{−1}
- 3D model (JSmol): Interactive image
- SMILES: CC(C)N1C(=O)\C(=C(\O)c2ccsc12)C(=O)NCCCN3CCCCC3
- InChI: InChI=1S/C19H27N3O3S/c1-13(2)22-18(25)15(16(23)14-7-12-26-19(14)22)17(24)20-8-6-11-21-9-4-3-5-10-21/h7,12-13,23H,3-6,8-11H2,1-2H3,(H,20,24); Key:SCHKZZSVELPJKU-UHFFFAOYSA-N

PRX-03140 is an orally-bioavailable selective partial agonist to the 5-Hydroxytryptamine receptor 4 (5-HT4) and a ligand for the Sigma-1 and Sigma-2 receptors. PRX-03140 is a partial agonist (18% relative to 5-HT) of the 5-HT_{4} receptor that was developed by EPIX Pharmaceuticals for Alzheimer's disease. PRX-03140 is a highly selective and potent (Ki = 14.3 nM) 5-HT4R agonist in radioligand binding assays with more than 100-fold difference in affinities compared with all other 5-HT receptors tested. PRX-03140 behaves as a partial agonist in cell lines expressing either the human 5-HT4aR, 5-HT4bR or 5-HT4eR isoforms, stimulating cAMP production to 30%-60% compared to 5-HT. PRX-03140 also demonstrates binding to both the Sigma-1 and Sigma-2 receptors (Ki = 10 nM and 36 nM, respectively) in radioligand binding assays, but demonstrates no significant affinity for more than 50 other receptors tested including GPCRs, ion channels and receptor tyrosine kinases. PRX-03140 demonstrates high CNS penetration without inducing significant distal gastrointestinal motility observed with gastrointestinally active 5-HT4 agonists (e.g. cisapride, tegaserod).

Epix Pharmaceuticals (formerly Predix Pharmaceuticals) was a pharmaceutical company based in Lexington, Massachusetts. In 2009, Epix was in the process of asset liquidation due to insufficient funds to stay afloat. Nanotherapeutics acquired the product in 2010, conducting one clinical study in PTSD patients. In 2018, the product was transferred to Nanoshift. Nanoshift and Nanopharmaceutics continue to support clinical studies. It has been tested in six Phase 1 and Phase 2 clinical trials.
