= C22H31N3O2 =

The molecular formula C_{22}H_{31}N_{3}O_{2} (molar mass: 369.50 g/mol, exact mass: 369.2416 u) may refer to:

- Solvent Yellow 124
- Piboserod
