= C21H29N5O2 =

The molecular formula C_{21}H_{29}N_{5}O_{2} (molar mass: 383.48 g/mol) may refer to:

- Tandospirone
- Usmarapride
