= SB-271046 =

Chemical compound

Identifiers
- IUPAC name: 5-chloro-N-(4-methoxy-3-piperazin-1-ylphenyl)-3-methyl-1-benzothiophene-2-sulfonamide
- CAS Number: 209481-20-9
- PubChem CID: 5312149
- IUPHAR/BPS: 276
- ChemSpider: 4471579
- UNII: L3SK5KX24S
- ChEMBL: ChEMBL431298
- CompTox Dashboard (EPA): DTXSID301026006

Chemical and physical data
- Formula: C_{20}H_{22}ClN_{3}O_{3}S_{2}
- Molar mass: 451.98 g·mol^{−1}
- 3D model (JSmol): Interactive image
- SMILES: C4CNCCN4c3cc(ccc3OC)NS(=O)(=O)c1sc2ccc(Cl)cc2c1C
- InChI: InChI=1S/C20H22ClN3O3S2/c1-13-16-11-14(21)3-6-19(16)28-20(13)29(25,26)23-15-4-5-18(27-2)17(12-15)24-9-7-22-8-10-24/h3-6,11-12,22-23H,7-10H2,1-2H3; Key:LOCQRDBFWSXQQI-UHFFFAOYSA-N

SB-271046 is a drug which is used in scientific research. It was one of the first selective 5-HT_{6} receptor antagonists to be discovered, and was found through high-throughput screening of the SmithKline Beecham Compound Bank using cloned 5-HT_{6} receptors as a target, with an initial lead compound being developed into SB-271046 through a structure-activity relationship (SAR) study. SB-271046 was found to be potent and selective in vitro and had good oral bioavailability in vivo, but had poor penetration across the blood–brain barrier, so further SAR work was then conducted, which led to improved 5-HT_{6} antagonists such as SB-357,134 and SB-399,885.

== Usages ==
SB-271046 was found to increase levels of the excitatory amino acid neurotransmitters glutamate and aspartate, as well as dopamine and noradrenaline in the frontal cortex and hippocampus of rats, and 5-HT_{6} antagonists have been shown to produce nootropic effects in a variety of animal studies. Suggested applications of these drugs include treatment of schizophrenia and other psychiatric disorders.
