= Capeserod =

Chemical compound

Clinical data
- ATC code: None

Identifiers
- IUPAC name: 5-(5-Amino-6-chloro-2,3-dihydro-1,4-benzodioxin-8-yl)-3-[1-(2-phenylethyl)piperidin-4-yl]-1,3,4-oxadiazol-2-one
- CAS Number: 769901-96-4 191023-43-5 (HCl)
- PubChem CID: 9805719
- IUPHAR/BPS: 29
- ChemSpider: 7981479
- UNII: 8163770L8P
- ChEMBL: ChEMBL2027925
- CompTox Dashboard (EPA): DTXSID60998277

Chemical and physical data
- Formula: C_{23}H_{25}ClN_{4}O_{4}
- Molar mass: 456.93 g·mol^{−1}
- 3D model (JSmol): Interactive image
- SMILES: C1CN(CCC1N2C(=O)OC(=N2)C3=CC(=C(C4=C3OCCO4)N)Cl)CCC5=CC=CC=C5
- InChI: InChI=1S/C23H25ClN4O4/c24-18-14-17(20-21(19(18)25)31-13-12-30-20)22-26-28(23(29)32-22)16-7-10-27(11-8-16)9-6-15-4-2-1-3-5-15/h1-5,14,16H,6-13,25H2; Key:MDBNTXARNGRHEV-UHFFFAOYSA-N

Capeserod (INN; development code SL65.0155) is a selective 5-HT_{4} receptor partial agonist with K_{i} = 0.6 nM and IA = 40–50% (relative to serotonin). It potently enhances cognition, learning, and memory, and also possesses antidepressant effects. Capeserod was in phase II clinical trials around 2004–2006 for the treatment of memory deficits and dementia but no new information has surfaced since and it appears to have been abandoned.

== See also ==
- RS-67,333
