= AS2674723 =

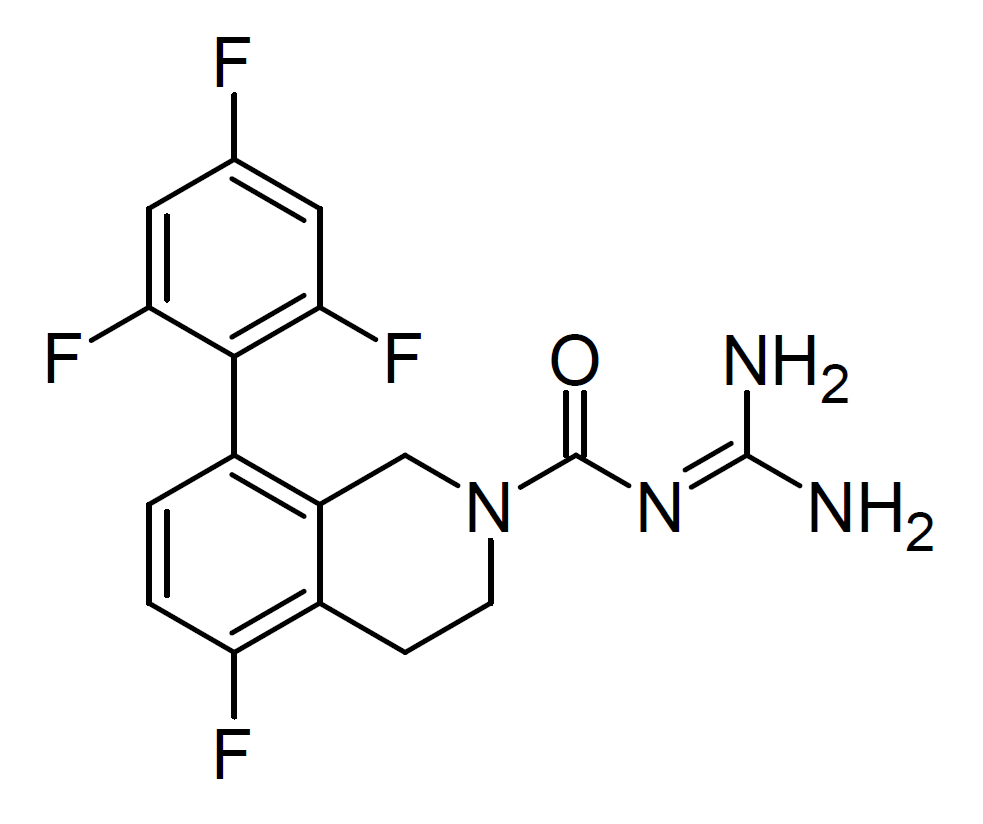

Identifiers
- IUPAC name: N-(diaminomethylidene)-5-fluoro-8-(2,4,6-trifluorophenyl)-3,4-dihydro-1H-isoquinoline-2-carboxamide
- CAS Number: 1392819-23-6
- PubChem CID: 60152964
- ChemSpider: 58954748
- ChEMBL: ChEMBL3654198
- PDB ligand: NN6 (PDBe, RCSB PDB)

Chemical and physical data
- Formula: C_{17}H_{14}F_{4}N_{4}O
- Molar mass: 366.320 g·mol^{−1}
- 3D model (JSmol): Interactive image
- SMILES: C1CN(CC2=C(C=CC(=C21)F)C3=C(C=C(C=C3F)F)F)C(=O)N=C(N)N
- InChI: InChI=1S/C17H14F4N4O/c18-8-5-13(20)15(14(21)6-8)10-1-2-12(19)9-3-4-25(7-11(9)10)17(26)24-16(22)23/h1-2,5-6H,3-4,7H2,(H4,22,23,24,26); Key:YBJHLGWWZWMRCD-UHFFFAOYSA-N

AS2674723 is a drug which acts as a selective antagonist for the serotonin receptor 5-HT_{5A}. It is used to study the structure and function of this receptor subtype such as its role in learning and memory, and has been crystallised with the 5-HT5A receptor so that its binding site can be modelled with computational chemistry techniques.

== See also ==
- ASP5736
