= UCSF648 =

Identifiers
- IUPAC name: N-[(5-chloroquinolin-8-yl)methyl]-3-ethylsulfonylpropan-1-amine
- CAS Number: 2637090-56-1
- PubChem CID: 154864756
- ChemSpider: 115008020
- ChEMBL: ChEMBL5079940

Chemical and physical data
- Formula: C_{15}H_{19}ClN_{2}O_{2}S
- Molar mass: 326.84 g·mol^{−1}
- 3D model (JSmol): Interactive image
- SMILES: CCS(=O)(=O)CCCNCC1=C2C(=C(C=C1)Cl)C=CC=N2
- InChI: InChI=1S/C15H19ClN2O2S/c1-2-21(19,20)10-4-8-17-11-12-6-7-14(16)13-5-3-9-18-15(12)13/h3,5-7,9,17H,2,4,8,10-11H2,1H3; Key:GNNSPXBPLMMQSR-UHFFFAOYSA-N

UCSF648 is an experimental drug which acts as a selective partial agonist for the 5-HT_{5A} serotonin receptor. Very few selective ligands are available for this receptor, and UCSF648 is expected to be useful in researching its structure and function.
