= E-6801 =

Names
- Preferred IUPAC name 6-Chloro-N-{3-[2-(dimethylamino)ethyl]-1H-indol-5-yl}imidazo[2,1-b][1,3]thiazole-5-sulfonamide

Identifiers
CAS Number	528859-04-3
3D model (JSmol)	Interactive image
ChEMBL	ChEMBL362628
ChemSpider	8378062
PubChem CID	10202564
UNII	W4Q1543X33
CompTox Dashboard (EPA)	DTXSID001122685
- InChI: InChI=1S/C17H18ClN5O2S2/c1-22(2)6-5-11-10-19-14-4-3-12(9-13(11)14)21-27(24,25)16-15(18)20-17-23(16)7-8-26-17/h3-4,7-10,19,21H,5-6H2,1-2H3 Key: RZAXUKVIIWUIOM-UHFFFAOYSA-N
- SMILES: CN(C)CCC1=CNC2=C1C=C(C=C2)NS(=O)(=O)C3=C(N=C4N3C=CS4)Cl

Properties
Chemical formula	C_{17}H_{18}ClN_{5}O_{2}S_{2}
Molar mass	423.94 g mol^{−1}
- Except where otherwise noted, data are given for materials in their standard state (at 25 °C [77 °F], 100 kPa). Infobox references

E-6801 is a partial agonist of the 5-HT_{6} receptor. It enhanced recognition memory and reversed the memory deficits of scopolamine in an object recognition task in a rat model. The mechanism of memory enhancement is due to a combined modulation of cholinergic and glutamatergic neurotransmission.

== See also ==
- E-6837
