= Felcisetrag =

Identifiers
- IUPAC name: methyl 4-[[4-[[(2-propan-2-yl-1H-benzimidazole-4-carbonyl)amino]methyl]piperidin-1-yl]methyl]piperidine-1-carboxylate
- CAS Number: 916075-84-8
- PubChem CID: 11961293
- IUPHAR/BPS: 8426
- DrugBank: DB12725
- ChemSpider: 10135539
- UNII: 35F0Y2W16Q
- KEGG: D12157
- ChEMBL: ChEMBL2402904
- CompTox Dashboard (EPA): DTXSID201352599

Chemical and physical data
- Formula: C_{25}H_{37}N_{5}O_{3}
- Molar mass: 455.603 g·mol^{−1}
- 3D model (JSmol): Interactive image
- SMILES: CC(C)C1=NC2=C(C=CC=C2N1)C(=O)NCC3CCN(CC3)CC4CCN(CC4)C(=O)OC
- InChI: InChI=1S/C25H37N5O3/c1-17(2)23-27-21-6-4-5-20(22(21)28-23)24(31)26-15-18-7-11-29(12-8-18)16-19-9-13-30(14-10-19)25(32)33-3/h4-6,17-19H,7-16H2,1-3H3,(H,26,31)(H,27,28); Key:MZOITCJKGUIQEI-UHFFFAOYSA-N

Felcisetrag (TAK-954, TD-8954) is a drug which acts as a potent and highly selective agonist for the serotonin receptor 5-HT_{4}. It is in clinical trials for the treatment of gastroparesis.
