= Idalopirdine =

Chemical compound

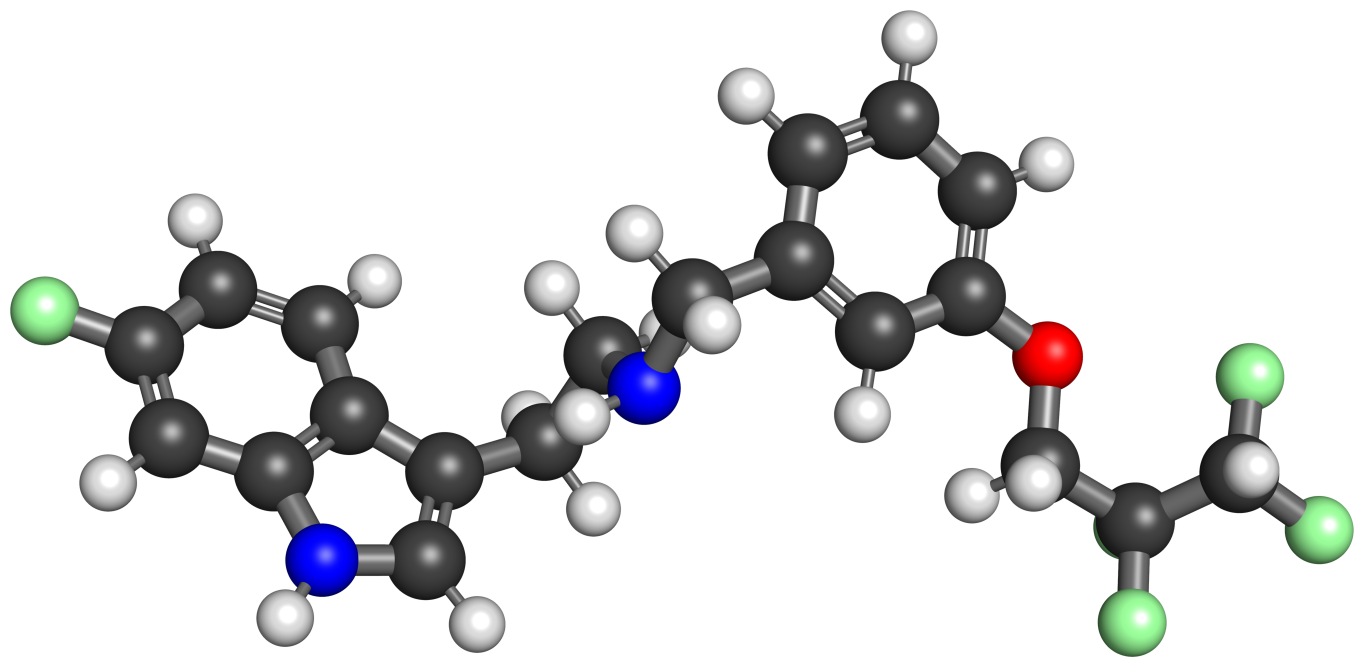

Clinical data
- Other names: Lu-AE-58054
- ATC code: None

Identifiers
- IUPAC name: 2-(6-Fluoro-1H-indol-3-yl)-N-(3-(2,2,3,3-tetrafluoropropoxy)benzyl)ethanamine
- CAS Number: 467459-31-0
- PubChem CID: 21071390
- ChemSpider: 19878969
- UNII: 59WCJ0YNWM
- KEGG: D10710
- ChEMBL: ChEMBL3286580
- CompTox Dashboard (EPA): DTXSID201026015
- ECHA InfoCard: 100.245.270

Chemical and physical data
- Formula: C_{20}H_{19}F_{5}N_{2}O
- Molar mass: 398.377 g·mol^{−1}
- 3D model (JSmol): Interactive image
- SMILES: FC(F)C(F)(F)COc1cccc(c1)CNCCc3c[nH]c2cc(F)ccc23
- InChI: InChI=1S/C20H19F5N2O/c21-15-4-5-17-14(11-27-18(17)9-15)6-7-26-10-13-2-1-3-16(8-13)28-12-20(24,25)19(22)23/h1-5,8-9,11,19,26-27H,6-7,10,12H2; Key:YBAWYTYNMZWMMJ-UHFFFAOYSA-N

Idalopirdine (INN; development code Lu AE58054) is a potent and selective 5-HT_{6} receptor antagonist under development by Lundbeck as an augmentation therapy for the treatment of cognitive deficits associated with Alzheimer's disease and schizophrenia. As of October 2013 it is in phase III clinical trials.

A phase III trial of two different daily doses of Lu AE58054 on top of 10 mg of donepezil for mild-to-moderate Alzheimer's failed to meet its primary endpoint with either dose. Two further phase III trials failed too, the company confirmed in early 2017.

== See also ==
- List of investigational cognition and memory disorder drugs
- Cerlapirdine
- Latrepirdine
