= Rs1805054 =

Genetic variation in the HTR6 gene

SNP: rs1805054
- Name(s): C267T, 267T/C
- Gene: HTR6
- Chromosome: 1

External databases
- Ensembl: Human SNPView
- dbSNP: 1805054
- HapMap: 1805054
- SNPedia: 1805054
- AlzGene: Meta-analysis; Overview

In genetics, Rs1805054, also called C267T, is a name used for a specific genetic variation, a single nucleotide polymorphism (SNP), in the HTR6 gene. It is one of the few investigated polymorphisms of its gene. C267T is a synonymous polymorphism.

As of 2008 meta-analysis of the polymorphism and Alzheimer's disease indicates that there probably is no association between the two, though individual studies report such an association, e.g., a Chinese study found an association with late-onset Alzheimer's disease. Another reported association in neuropsychiatry disorders is with treatment response in depression.

C267T has also been examined in relation to personality traits, with a Korean study finding some evidence for an association with the trait self-transcendence. A Japanese study reported no association with personality traits using the NEO PI-R personality inventory.
