= GR-113808 =

Chemical compound

Identifiers
- IUPAC name: 1-(2-methylsulfonylaminoethyl-4-piperidinyl)methyl-1-methyl-1H-indole-3-carboxylate
- CAS Number: 144625-51-4
- PubChem CID: 119376
- IUPHAR/BPS: 247
- ChemSpider: 106623
- UNII: ZT350OYT3I
- CompTox Dashboard (EPA): DTXSID40162772

Chemical and physical data
- Formula: C_{19}H_{27}N_{3}O_{4}S
- Molar mass: 393.50 g·mol^{−1}
- 3D model (JSmol): Interactive image
- SMILES: c13ccccc3c(cn1C)C(=O)OCC(CC2)CCN2CCNS(=O)(C)=O
- InChI: InChI=1S/C19H27N3O4S/c1-21-13-17(16-5-3-4-6-18(16)21)19(23)26-14-15-7-10-22(11-8-15)12-9-20-27(2,24)25/h3-6,13,15,20H,7-12,14H2,1-2H3; Key:MOZPSIXKYJUTKI-UHFFFAOYSA-N

GR-113808 is a drug which acts as a potent and selective 5-HT_{4} serotonin receptor antagonist. It is used in researching the roles of 5-HT_{4} receptors in various processes, and has been used to test some of the proposed therapeutic effects of selective 5-HT_{4} agonists, such as for instance blocking the nootropic effects of 5-HT_{4} agonists, and worsening the respiratory depression produced by opioid analgesic drugs, which appears to be partly 5-HT_{4} mediated and can be counteracted by certain 5-HT_{4} agonists.
