= Cerlapirdine =

Chemical compound

Clinical data
- ATC code: none

Legal status
- Legal status: Investigational

Identifiers
- IUPAC name: N,N-dimethyl-3-[(3-naphthalen-1-ylsulfonyl-2H-indazol-5-yl)oxy]propan-1-amine
- CAS Number: 925448-93-7 925447-04-7 (hydrochloride)
- PubChem CID: 16071605
- ChemSpider: 17231095
- UNII: EK40PJ0V49
- KEGG: D10099
- ChEMBL: ChEMBL2103880
- CompTox Dashboard (EPA): DTXSID201137232

Chemical and physical data
- Formula: C_{22}H_{23}N_{3}O_{3}S
- Molar mass: 409.50 g·mol^{−1}
- 3D model (JSmol): Interactive image
- SMILES: CN(C)CCCOc4ccc3[nH]nc(S(=O)(=O)c1cccc2ccccc12)c3c4
- InChI: InChI=1S/C22H23N3O3S/c1-25(2)13-6-14-28-17-11-12-20-19(15-17)22(24-23-20)29(26,27)21-10-5-8-16-7-3-4-9-18(16)21/h3-5,7-12,15H,6,13-14H2,1-2H3,(H,23,24); Key:NXQGEDVQXVTCDA-UHFFFAOYSA-N

Cerlapirdine (USAN; SAM-531, WAY-262,531, PF-05212365) is a drug which was under development by Wyeth/Pfizer for the treatment of cognitive disorders associated with Alzheimer's disease and schizophrenia. In a phase II clinical trial it demonstrated a trend toward efficacy along with a good side effect profile and no incidence of serious adverse events, but no further development has occurred since 2011.

It exerts its effects by acting as a selective 5-HT_{6} receptor antagonist.

== See also ==
- List of investigational antipsychotics
- Idalopirdine
- Latrepirdine
