= PRX-07034 =

Chemical compound

Clinical data
- Routes of administration: Oral
- ATC code: none

Legal status
- Legal status: In general: uncontrolled

Identifiers
- IUPAC name: N-[1-(5-chloro-2,3-dimethoxyphenyl)ethyl]-2-methylsulfonyl-5-piperazin-1-ylaniline
- CAS Number: 903580-16-5
- PubChem CID: 11532574
- ChemSpider: 9707357
- UNII: YJ5TMF911R
- CompTox Dashboard (EPA): DTXSID101116691

Chemical and physical data
- Formula: C_{21}H_{29}Cl_{2}N_{3}O_{4}S
- Molar mass: 490.44 g·mol^{−1}
- 3D model (JSmol): Interactive image
- SMILES: COc2cc(Cl)cc(c2OC)C(C)Nc1cc(ccc1S(=O)(=O)C)N3CCNCC3
- InChI: InChI=1S/C21H28ClN3O4S/c1-14(17-11-15(22)12-19(28-2)21(17)29-3)24-18-13-16(25-9-7-23-8-10-25)5-6-20(18)30(4,26)27/h5-6,11-14,23-24H,7-10H2,1-4H3; Key:BSLXKMCHXRCBIH-UHFFFAOYSA-N

PRX-07034 is a selective 5-HT_{6} receptor antagonist. It has cognition and memory-enhancing properties and potently decreases food intake and body weight in rodents. PRX-07034 was under development by Epix Pharmaceuticals for the treatment of obesity and cognitive impairment associated with Alzheimer's disease and schizophrenia but upon the company collapsing due to lack of funds the compound was auctioned to another corporation.
