= Naluzotan =

Chemical compound

Clinical data
- Routes of administration: Oral
- ATC code: None

Identifiers
- IUPAC name: N-(3-{4-[4-(1-cyclohexylmethanesulfonamido)butyl]piperazin-1-yl}phenyl)acetamide
- CAS Number: 740873-06-7
- PubChem CID: 11430856
- ChemSpider: 9605731
- UNII: LQ54E5B4EW
- CompTox Dashboard (EPA): DTXSID40995527

Chemical and physical data
- Formula: C_{23}H_{38}N_{4}O_{3}S
- Molar mass: 450.64 g·mol^{−1}
- 3D model (JSmol): Interactive image
- SMILES: O=C(Nc3cccc(N2CCN(CCCCNS(=O)(=O)CC1CCCCC1)CC2)c3)C
- InChI: InChI=1S/C23H38N4O3S/c1-20(28)25-22-10-7-11-23(18-22)27-16-14-26(15-17-27)13-6-5-12-24-31(29,30)19-21-8-3-2-4-9-21/h7,10-11,18,21,24H,2-6,8-9,12-17,19H2,1H3,(H,25,28); Key:SPWZXWDPAWDKQE-UHFFFAOYSA-N

Naluzotan (INN, USAN; PRX-00023) is a serotonergic drug of the phenylpiperazine class that was under investigation by EPIX Pharmaceuticals Inc for the treatment of generalized anxiety disorder and major depressive disorder. It acts as a selective and potent 5-HT_{1A} receptor partial agonist, readily stimulating prolactin responses, though it has also been found to bind to and activate the σ receptor.

== Clinical trials ==
Naluzotan was well tolerated in clinical trials, with more patients in the control group dropping out due to adverse effects than in the active group in one study. The most frequently reported side effect was headache in 15% of patients (compared to 10% for placebo).

In addition, naluzotan demonstrated significant antidepressant and anxiolytic effects as per the HAM-D and MADRS and the HAM-A, respectively, in some trials, but in others it did not. In the end it was not found to be significantly superior enough to placebo and development was stopped.
