= PZKKN-94 =

Clinical data
- Other names: PZKKN94
- Drug class: Serotonin; 5-HT_{1B} receptor agonist; Serotonin 5-HT_{6} receptor antagonist; Antiparkinsonian agent
- ATC code: None

Identifiers
- IUPAC name: 2-(2,4-difluorophenyl)sulfonyl-4-piperazin-1-yl-1,3-dihydroisoindole
- PubChem CID: 142592201

Chemical and physical data
- Formula: C_{18}H_{19}F_{2}N_{3}O_{2}S
- Molar mass: 379.43 g·mol^{−1}
- 3D model (JSmol): Interactive image
- SMILES: C1CN(CCN1)C2=CC=CC3=C2CN(C3)S(=O)(=O)C4=C(C=C(C=C4)F)F
- InChI: InChI=1S/C18H19F2N3O2S/c19-14-4-5-18(16(20)10-14)26(24,25)23-11-13-2-1-3-17(15(13)12-23)22-8-6-21-7-9-22/h1-5,10,21H,6-9,11-12H2; Key:PMKDLPXTADKLHI-UHFFFAOYSA-N

PZKKN-94 is a dual serotonin 5-HT_{1B} receptor agonist and serotonin 5-HT_{6} receptor antagonist which is under investigation for the potential treatment of Parkinson's disease. Its values were 39 nM (EC_{50}) and 88.1% (E_{max}) at the serotonin 5-HT_{1B} receptor and 7.7 nM (K_{B}) at the serotonin 5-HT_{6} receptor. The drug showed selectivity for these receptors over 43 other targets. It shows favorable drug-like properties. In rodents, PZKKN-94 shows antiparkinsonian-like, pro-cognitive, and antidepressant-like effects. PZKNN-94 was first described in the scientific literature by Paweł Zajdel and colleagues in 2025.

== See also ==
- List of investigational Parkinson's disease drugs
