= SB-204070 =

Chemical compound

Identifiers
- IUPAC name: (1-butyl-4-piperidinyl)methyl-8-amino-7-chloro-1,4-benzodioxane-5-carboxylate
- CAS Number: 148688-01-1
- PubChem CID: 121881
- IUPHAR/BPS: 256
- ChemSpider: 108731
- UNII: DQ39GL43SF
- ChEMBL: ChEMBL68131
- CompTox Dashboard (EPA): DTXSID90164069

Chemical and physical data
- Formula: C_{19}H_{27}ClN_{2}O_{4}
- Molar mass: 382.89 g·mol^{−1}
- 3D model (JSmol): Interactive image
- SMILES: Nc1c2OCCOc2c(cc1Cl)C(=O)OCC3CCN(CCCC)CC3
- InChI: InChI=1S/C19H27ClN2O4/c1-2-3-6-22-7-4-13(5-8-22)12-26-19(23)14-11-15(20)16(21)18-17(14)24-9-10-25-18/h11,13H,2-10,12,21H2,1H3; Key:AOOSJYIINXVNHV-UHFFFAOYSA-N

SB-204070 is a drug which acts as a potent and selective 5-HT_{4} serotonin receptor antagonist (or weak partial agonist), and is used for research into the function of this receptor subtype.
