= Ro 04-6790 =

Chemical compound

Clinical data
- ATC code: none

Identifiers
- IUPAC name: 4-amino-N-[2,6-bis(methylamino)-4-pyrimidinyl]-benzenesulfonamide
- CAS Number: 202466-68-0
- PubChem CID: 5312145
- IUPHAR/BPS: 274
- ChemSpider: 4471575
- UNII: CU78RAR5ZH
- ChEMBL: ChEMBL433461
- CompTox Dashboard (EPA): DTXSID701017998

Chemical and physical data
- Formula: C_{12}H_{16}N_{6}O_{2}S
- Molar mass: 308.36 g·mol^{−1}
- 3D model (JSmol): Interactive image
- SMILES: Nc2ccc(cc2)S(=O)(=O)Nc1cc(NC)nc(NC)n1
- InChI: InChI=1S/C12H16N6O2S/c1-14-10-7-11(17-12(15-2)16-10)18-21(19,20)9-5-3-8(13)4-6-9/h3-7H,13H2,1-2H3,(H3,14,15,16,17,18); Key:JELFWSXQTXRMAJ-UHFFFAOYSA-N

Ro 04-6790 is a drug, developed by Hoffmann–La Roche, which has applications in scientific research. It acts as a potent and selective receptor antagonist for the 5-HT_{6} serotonin receptor subtype, with little or no affinity at other receptors. In common with other drugs of this class, Ro 04-6790 has nootropic effects in animals, and reduces the amnesia produced by memory-impairing drugs such as dizocilpine and scopolamine.
