= WAY-181187 =

Chemical compound

Clinical data
- ATC code: none

Identifiers
- IUPAC name: 2-(1-{6-Chloroimidazo[2,1-b][1,3]thiazole-5-sulfonyl}-1H-indol-3-yl)ethan-1-amine
- CAS Number: 554403-49-5
- PubChem CID: 10150497
- IUPHAR/BPS: 3240
- ChemSpider: 8326005
- UNII: WXE3H7W295
- ChEMBL: ChEMBL392760
- CompTox Dashboard (EPA): DTXSID50204011

Chemical and physical data
- Formula: C_{15}H_{13}ClN_{4}O_{2}S_{2}
- Molar mass: 380.87 g·mol^{−1}
- 3D model (JSmol): Interactive image
- SMILES: NCCc1cn(c2ccccc12)S(=O)(=O)c1c(Cl)nc2sccn12
- InChI: InChI=1S/C15H13ClN4O2S2/c16-13-14(19-7-8-23-15(19)18-13)24(21,22)20-9-10(5-6-17)11-3-1-2-4-12(11)20/h1-4,7-9H,5-6,17H2; Key:RYBOXBBYCVOYNO-UHFFFAOYSA-N

WAY-181187 is a high affinity and selective 5-HT_{6} receptor full agonist. It induces robust increases in extracellular GABA levels in the frontal cortex, hippocampus, striatum, and amygdala of rats without affecting concentrations in the nucleus accumbens or thalamus, and has modest to no effects on norepinephrine, serotonin, dopamine, or glutamate levels in these areas. WAY-181187 has demonstrated preclinical efficacy in rodent models of depression, anxiety, and notably obsessive-compulsive disorder, though it has also been shown to impair cognition and memory.

== See also ==
- Substituted tryptamine
- WAY-208466
