= Usmarapride =

Clinical data
- Other names: SUVN-D4010; SUVN-D-4010
- Routes of administration: Oral
- Drug class: Serotonin 5-HT_{4} receptor agonist
- ATC code: None

Identifiers
- IUPAC name: 2-[1-(3-methoxypropyl)piperidin-4-yl]-5-(1-propan-2-ylindazol-3-yl)-1,3,4-oxadiazole
- CAS Number: 1428862-32-1
- PubChem CID: 71508291
- ChemSpider: 64853702
- UNII: GNQ25KYD72
- ChEMBL: ChEMBL4297327

Chemical and physical data
- Formula: C_{21}H_{29}N_{5}O_{2}
- Molar mass: 383.496 g·mol^{−1}
- 3D model (JSmol): Interactive image
- SMILES: CC(C)N1C2=CC=CC=C2C(=N1)C3=NN=C(O3)C4CCN(CC4)CCCOC
- InChI: InChI=1S/C21H29N5O2/c1-15(2)26-18-8-5-4-7-17(18)19(24-26)21-23-22-20(28-21)16-9-12-25(13-10-16)11-6-14-27-3/h4-5,7-8,15-16H,6,9-14H2,1-3H3; Key:DWTFBJGTRBMHPG-UHFFFAOYSA-N

Usmarapride (INN; developmental code name SUVN-D4010) is a serotonin 5-HT_{4} receptor agonist which is or was under development for the treatment of cognitive deficits in Alzheimer's disease and schizophrenia. It is taken orally.

== Pharmacology ==
The drug is a potent and selective partial agonist of the serotonin 5-HT_{4} receptor. It is highly selective against the serotonin 5-HT_{3} receptor and other closely related receptors. The drug shows cognition- and memory-enhancing effects, neuroprotective effects, and antidepressant-like effects in preclinical research. Its pharmacokinetics and pharmacodynamics have been evaluated in humans. In terms of chemical structure, the drug is an indazole derivative.

== Development ==
Usmarapride is under development by Suven Life Sciences. As of September 2023, no recent development has been reported for treatment of Alzheimer's disease and schizophrenia. The drug has reached phase 1 clinical trials for both of these indications.

== See also ==
- List of investigational antipsychotics
