= Cyanopindolol =

Chemical compound

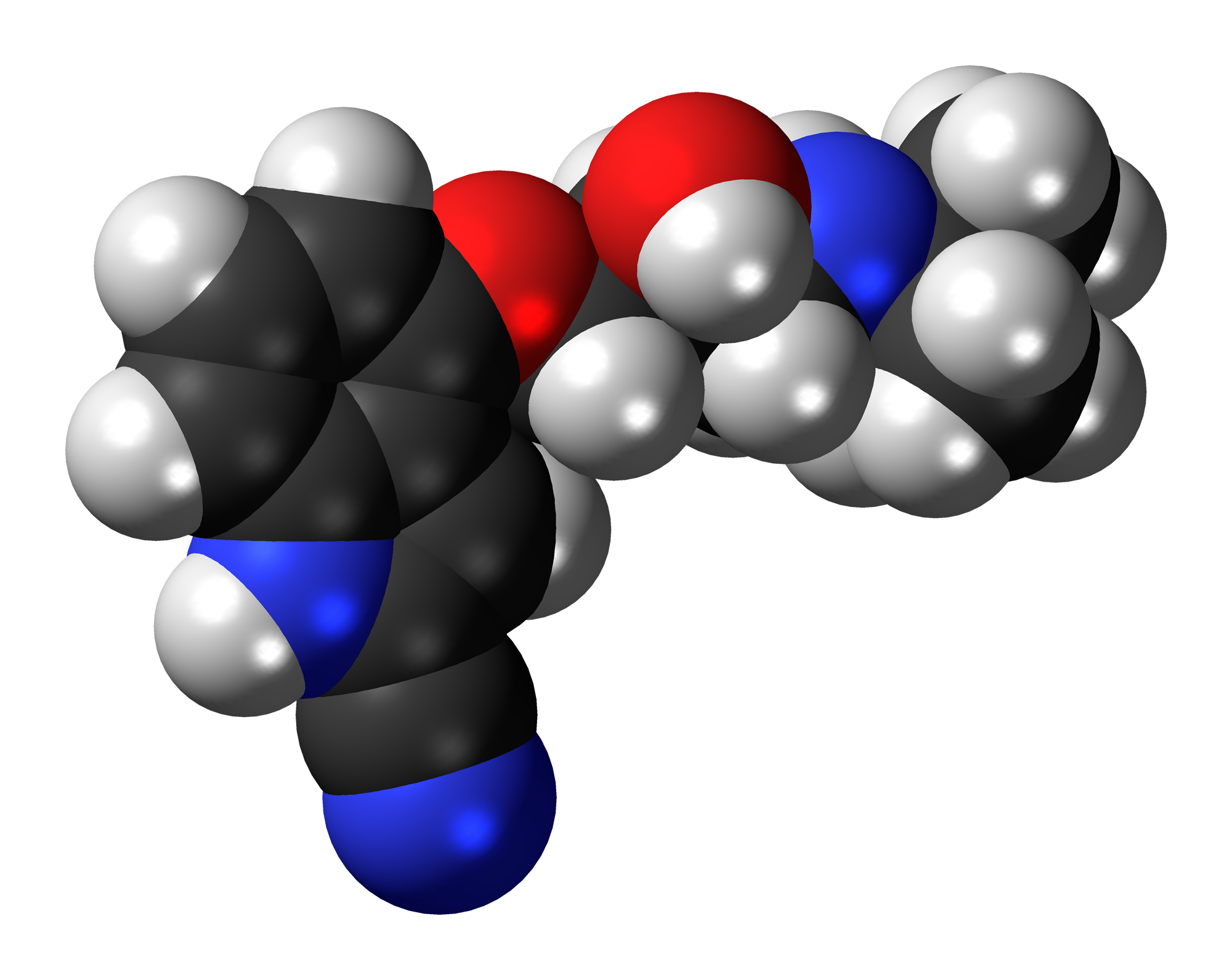

Clinical data
- ATC code: none

Identifiers
- IUPAC name: (RS)-4-[3-(tert-Butylamino)-2-hydroxypropoxy]-1H-indole-2-carbonitrile
- CAS Number: 69906-85-0
- PubChem CID: 155346
- IUPHAR/BPS: 132
- ChemSpider: 136847
- UNII: 4K0SD5SNFS
- ChEMBL: ChEMBL378501
- PDB ligand: P32 (PDBe, RCSB PDB)
- CompTox Dashboard (EPA): DTXSID201027570

Chemical and physical data
- Formula: C_{16}H_{21}N_{3}O_{2}
- Molar mass: 287.363 g·mol^{−1}
- 3D model (JSmol): Interactive image
- Chirality: Racemic mixture
- SMILES: N#CC1=CC2=C(OCC(CNC(C)(C)C)O)C=CC=C2N1
- InChI: InChI=1S/C16H21N3O2/c1-16(2,3)18-9-12(20)10-21-15-6-4-5-14-13(15)7-11(8-17)19-14/h4-7,12,18-20H,9-10H2,1-3H3; Key:QXIUMMLTJVHILT-UHFFFAOYSA-N

Cyanopindolol is a drug related to pindolol which acts as both a β_{1} adrenoceptor antagonist and a 5-HT_{1A} receptor antagonist. Its radiolabelled derivative iodocyanopindolol has been widely used in mapping the distribution of beta adrenoreceptors in the body.
