= WAY-208466 =

Chemical compound

Clinical data
- ATC code: none

Identifiers
- IUPAC name: 2-{3-[(3-Fluorophenyl)sulfonyl]-1H-pyrrolo[2,3-b]pyridin-1-yl}-N,N-dimethylethanamine
- CAS Number: 633304-27-5 1207064-61-6 (2 HCl)
- PubChem CID: 10337743
- ChemSpider: 8513202
- UNII: 0AXW9ALG9W
- ChEMBL: ChEMBL571858
- CompTox Dashboard (EPA): DTXSID60621755

Chemical and physical data
- Formula: C_{17}H_{18}FN_{3}O_{2}S
- Molar mass: 347.41 g·mol^{−1}
- 3D model (JSmol): Interactive image
- SMILES: CN(C)CCN1C=C(C2=C1N=CC=C2)S(=O)(=O)C3=CC=CC(=C3)F

WAY-208466 is a potent and highly selective full agonist of the 5-HT_{6} receptor. It increases GABA levels in the cerebral cortex and tolerance does not appear to occur to this action upon chronic administration. Animal studies have shown that WAY-208466 produces antidepressant and anxiolytic effects in rodents and it may also be useful in the treatment of obsessive-compulsive disorder.

== See also ==
- WAY-181187
- Tetrahydropyridinylpyrrolopyridine
