= EGIS-12233 =

Chemical compound

Clinical data
- ATC code: none

Identifiers
- IUPAC name: 5,7-dichloro-3-[4-[4-(4-chlorophenyl)piperazin-1-yl]butyl]-3-ethyl-indolin-2-one
- CAS Number: 869742-55-2
- PubChem CID: 11525867
- ChemSpider: 9700653
- ChEMBL: ChEMBL260870
- CompTox Dashboard (EPA): DTXSID501028191

Chemical and physical data
- Formula: C_{24}H_{28}Cl_{3}N_{3}O
- Molar mass: 480.86 g·mol^{−1}
- 3D model (JSmol): Interactive image
- SMILES: c3cc(Cl)ccc3N4CCN(CC4)CCCCC1(CC)c2cc(Cl)cc(Cl)c2NC1=O
- InChI: InChI=1S/C24H28Cl3N3O/c1-2-24(20-15-18(26)16-21(27)22(20)28-23(24)31)9-3-4-10-29-11-13-30(14-12-29)19-7-5-17(25)6-8-19/h5-8,15-16H,2-4,9-14H2,1H3,(H,28,31); Key:NOWFIMHNXPZVSK-UHFFFAOYSA-N

EGIS-12,233 is a drug with applications in scientific research, acting as a potent and selective antagonist for both the 5-HT_{6} and 5-HT_{7} serotonin receptor subtypes, with good selectivity over other receptors. It has been shown to increase dopamine release in cochlear tissue, suggesting a role for the 5-HT_{6} and 5-HT_{7} receptors in regulation of the hearing system.
