= SB-258585 =

Chemical compound

Identifiers
- IUPAC name: 4-Iodo-N-[4-methoxy-3-(4-methyl-1-piperazinyl)phenyl]benzenesulfonamide
- CAS Number: 209480-63-7
- PubChem CID: 3248571
- IUPHAR/BPS: 3232
- ChemSpider: 2498938
- UNII: 54BP69J53F
- ChEMBL: ChEMBL60264
- CompTox Dashboard (EPA): DTXSID801026944

Chemical and physical data
- Formula: C_{18}H_{22}IN_{3}O_{3}S
- Molar mass: 487.36 g·mol^{−1}
- 3D model (JSmol): Interactive image
- SMILES: C3CN(C)CCN3c1cc(ccc1OC)NS(=O)(=O)c2ccc(I)cc2
- InChI: InChI=1S/C18H22IN3O3S/c1-21-9-11-22(12-10-21)17-13-15(5-8-18(17)25-2)20-26(23,24)16-6-3-14(19)4-7-16/h3-8,13,20H,9-12H2,1-2H3; Key:BDHMSYNBSBZCAF-UHFFFAOYSA-N

SB-258585 is a drug which is used in scientific research. It acts as a potent, selective and orally active 5-HT_{6} receptor antagonist, with a Ki of 8.9nM. It is used in its ^{125}I radiolabelled form to map the distribution of 5-HT_{6} receptors in the brain.

SB-258585 and other 5-HT_{6} antagonists show nootropic effects in animal studies, as well as antidepressant and anxiolytic effects, and have been proposed as potential novel treatments for cognitive disorders such as schizophrenia and Alzheimer's disease.
