= E-6837 =

Names
- Preferred IUPAC name 5-Chloro-N-{3-[2-(dimethylamino)ethyl]-1H-indol-5-yl}naphthalene-2-sulfonamide
- Other names E 6837

Identifiers
CAS Number	528859-61-2
3D model (JSmol)	Interactive image
ChEMBL	ChEMBL175835
ChemSpider	5294027
MeSH	C500059
PubChem CID	6918836
UNII	4AXX8P95BU
CompTox Dashboard (EPA)	DTXSID101136900
- InChI: InChI=1S/C22H22ClN3O2S/c1-26(2)11-10-16-14-24-22-9-6-17(13-20(16)22)25-29(27,28)18-7-8-19-15(12-18)4-3-5-21(19)23/h3-9,12-14,24-25H,10-11H2,1-2H3 Key: OOIQBABUMXSCPC-UHFFFAOYSA-N
- SMILES: CN(C)CCC1=CNC2=C1C=C(C=C2)NS(=O)(=O)C3=CC4=C(C=C3)C(=CC=C4)Cl

Properties
Chemical formula	C_{22}H_{22}ClN_{3}O_{2}S
Molar mass	427.95 g/mol
- Except where otherwise noted, data are given for materials in their standard state (at 25 °C [77 °F], 100 kPa). Infobox references

E-6837 is an orally active, 5-HT_{6} agonist developed in an attempt to create an anti-obesity medication.

In cell lines expressing rat 5-HT_{6} receptors, it acted as a partial agonist (on presumed silent receptors), while it acted as a full agonist on human 5-HT_{6} receptors (which are constitutively active).

Oral administration of E-6837 reduced food intake, but only transiently. In rats, twice daily administration of E-6837 over the course of 4 weeks resulted in a 15.7% reduction in body weight, compared to 11% reduction for sibutramine. This weight loss remained significant for E-6837 after a 43-day withdrawal period, whereas the weight difference was non-significant for sibutramine (i.e., sibutramine had a rebound effect while E-6837 did not), and this weight loss was found to be due to a loss of fat mass. The reduction in fat mass in E-6837 treated animals was associated with a 50% decrease in plasma leptin levels, and also reduced glucose and insulin levels in plasma after a glucose tolerance test. This indicates that weight loss from E-6837 is associated with improved insulin sensitivity, and thus, better glycemic control.

One proposed mechanism of action is that E-6837 acts on neurons in the hypothalamus, which has shown significant levels of 5-HT_{6} receptor mRNA. The hypothalamus is one key structure involved in regulating food intake.

== See also ==
- E-6801
