= 5-HT5A receptor =

Protein-coding gene in the species Homo sapiens

HTR5A

Identifiers
- Aliases: HTR5A, 5-HT5A, 5-HT5A receptor, 5-hydroxytryptamine receptor 5A
- External IDs: OMIM: 601305; MGI: 96283; GeneCards: HTR5A

Gene location (Human)
Chr.	Chromosome 7 (human)
Band	7q36.2	Start	155,070,324 bp
Band	7q36.2	End	155,087,392 bp

Gene location (Mouse)
Chr.	Chromosome 5 (mouse)
Band	5 B1|5 13.24 cM	Start	28,047,147 bp
Band	5 B1|5 13.24 cM	End	28,060,086 bp
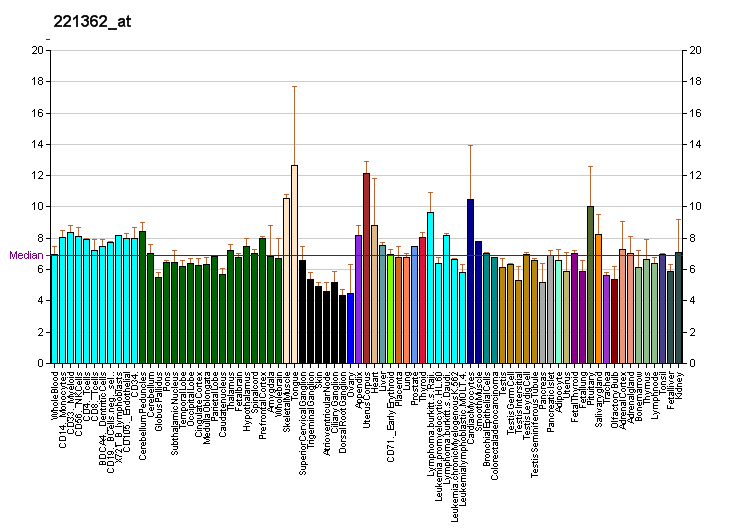
RNA expression pattern
Bgee	Human / Mouse (ortholog); Top expressed in: cerebellar hemisphere; right hemisphere of cerebellum; prefrontal cortex; right frontal lobe; Brodmann area 9; anterior cingulate cortex; secondary oocyte; hypothalamus; nucleus accumbens; superior frontal gyrus / Top expressed in: secondary oocyte; intestinal villus; Ileal epithelium; zygote; lumbar subsegment of spinal cord; choroid plexus of fourth ventricle; perirhinal cortex; entorhinal cortex; gastrula; primary visual cortex; More reference expression data
BioGPS	More reference expression data
Gene ontology
Molecular function	G protein-coupled receptor activity; signal transducer activity; G protein-coupled serotonin receptor activity; neurotransmitter receptor activity; serotonin binding
Cellular component	integral component of membrane; perikaryon; plasma membrane; rough endoplasmic reticulum; Golgi apparatus; integral component of plasma membrane; membrane; dendrite; integral component of postsynaptic specialization membrane
Biological process	G protein-coupled receptor signaling pathway; G protein-coupled receptor signaling pathway, coupled to cyclic nucleotide second messenger; brain development; response to estradiol; hippocampus development; cAMP-mediated signaling; signal transduction; adenylate cyclase-inhibiting serotonin receptor signaling pathway; chemical synaptic transmission
Sources:Amigo / QuickGO
Orthologs
Databases	NCBI: entry; OMA: entry
Species	Human	Mouse
Entrez	3361	15563
Ensembl	ENSG00000157219	ENSMUSG00000039106
UniProt	P47898	P30966
RefSeq (mRNA)	NM_024012	NM_008314
RefSeq (protein)	NP_076917	NP_032340
Location (UCSC)	Chr 7: 155.07 – 155.09 Mb	Chr 5: 28.05 – 28.06 Mb
PubMed search
- Wikidata
View/Edit Human	View/Edit Mouse

5-Hydroxytryptamine (serotonin) receptor 5A, also known as HTR5A, is a protein that in humans is encoded by the HTR5A gene. Agonists and antagonists for 5-HT receptors, as well as serotonin uptake inhibitors, present promnesic (memory-promoting) and/or anti-amnesic effects under different conditions, and 5-HT receptors are also associated with neural changes.

== Function ==
The gene described in this record is a member of 5-hydroxytryptamine receptor family and encodes a multi-pass membrane protein that functions as a receptor for 5-hydroxytryptamine and couples to G proteins, negatively influencing cAMP levels via G_{i} and G_{o}. This protein has been shown to function in part through the regulation of intracellular Ca^{2+} mobilization. The 5-HT_{5A} receptor has been shown to be functional in a native expression system.

Rodents have been shown to possess two functional 5-HT_{5} receptor subtypes, 5-HT_{5A} and 5-HT_{5B}, however while humans possess a gene coding for the 5-HT_{5B} subtype, its coding sequence is interrupted by stop codons, making the gene non-functional, and so only the 5-HT_{5A} subtype is expressed in human brain.

It also appears to serve as a presynaptic serotonin autoreceptor.

== Clinical significance ==
The neurotransmitter serotonin (5-hydroxytryptamine, 5-HT) has been implicated in a wide range of psychiatric conditions and also has vasoconstrictive and vasodilatory effects.

== Selective ligands ==
Few highly selective ligands are commercially available for the 5-HT_{5A} receptor, though the field has expanded considerably in recent years. When selective activation of this receptor is desired in scientific research, the non-selective serotonin receptor agonist 5-Carboxamidotryptamine can be used in conjunction with selective antagonists for its other targets (principally 5-HT_{1A}, 5-HT_{1B}, 5-HT_{1D}, and 5-HT_{7}). Research in this area is ongoing.

=== Agonists ===
- LSD:(+)-lysergic acid.
- Lisuride – partial agonist.
- 5-CT – full agonist.
- Methylergometrine – full agonist.
- Valerenic acid – a component of valerian, has been shown to act as a 5HT_{5A} partial agonist.
- Olanzapine – an atypical antipsychotic.
- Psilocin
- Aripiprazole - an atypical antipsychotic
- UCSF648 - selective 5-HT_{5A} partial agonist
- Another ligand that has been recently disclosed is shown below, claimed be a selective 5-HT_{5A} agonist with K_{i} = 124 nM.

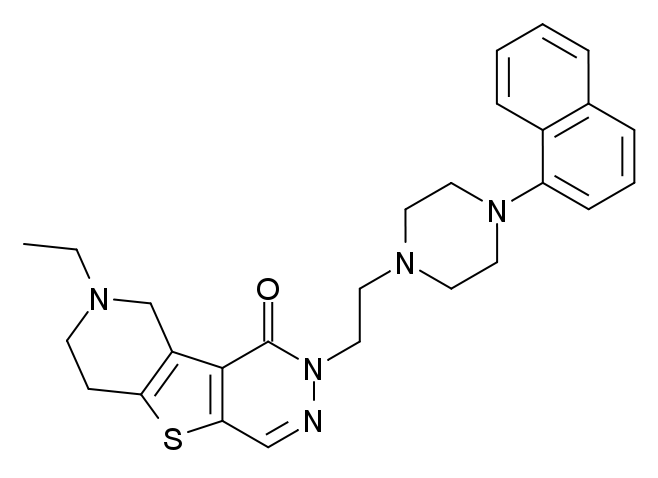

=== Antagonists ===
- ASP5736
- AS-2030680
- AS-2674723
- MS112 – selective potent antangonist.
- Latrepirdine (non-selective).
- Risperidone – (non-selective), moderate 206 nM affinity.
- SB-699,551

== See also ==
- 5-HT receptor
- 5-HT_{1} receptor
- 5-HT_{2} receptor
- 5-HT_{3} receptor
- 5-HT_{4} receptor
- 5-HT_{6} receptor
- 5-HT_{7} receptor
