= Zacopride =

Chemical compound

Clinical data
- ATC code: none

Identifiers
- IUPAC name: 4-amino-5-chloro-2-methoxy-N-(quinuclidin-3-yl)benzamide
- CAS Number: 90182-92-6
- PubChem CID: 108182
- IUPHAR/BPS: 245
- ChemSpider: 97262
- UNII: 9GN3OT4156
- ChEBI: CHEBI:235525
- ChEMBL: ChEMBL18041
- CompTox Dashboard (EPA): DTXSID1048251

Chemical and physical data
- Formula: C_{15}H_{20}ClN_{3}O_{2}
- Molar mass: 309.79 g·mol^{−1}
- 3D model (JSmol): Interactive image
- SMILES: COC1=CC(=C(C=C1C(=O)NC2CN3CCC2CC3)Cl)N
- InChI: InChI=1S/C15H20ClN3O2/c1-21-14-7-12(17)11(16)6-10(14)15(20)18-13-8-19-4-2-9(13)3-5-19/h6-7,9,13H,2-5,8,17H2,1H3,(H,18,20); Key:FEROPKNOYKURCJ-UHFFFAOYSA-N

Zacopride is a potent antagonist at the 5-HT_{3} receptor and an agonist at the 5-HT_{4} receptor. It has anxiolytic and nootropic effects in animal models, with the (R)-(+)-enantiomer being the more active form. It also has antiemetic and pro-respiratory effects, both reducing sleep apnea and reversing opioid-induced respiratory depression in animal studies. Early animal trials have also revealed that administration of zacopride can reduce preference for and consumption of ethanol.

Zacopride was found to significantly increase aldosterone levels in human subjects for 180 minutes at a dose of 400 micrograms. It is thought to do this by stimulating the 5-HT_{4} receptors on the adrenal glands. Zacopride also stimulated aldosterone secretion when applied to human adrenal glands in vitro. No significant changes were observed in renin, ACTH, or cortisol levels.

Zacopride has been tested in clinical trials for the treatment of schizophrenia, but was found unsuccessful.
