= 5-HT4 receptor =

Protein-coding gene in the species Homo sapiens

HTR4

Identifiers
- Aliases: HTR4, 5-HT4, 5-HT4R, 5-HT4 receptor, 5-hydroxytryptamine receptor 4
- External IDs: OMIM: 602164; MGI: 109246; GeneCards: HTR4

Gene location (Human)
Chr.	Chromosome 5 (human)
Band	5q32	Start	148,451,032 bp
Band	5q32	End	148,677,235 bp

Gene location (Mouse)
Chr.	Chromosome 18 (mouse)
Band	18|18 E1	Start	62,457,275 bp
Band	18|18 E1	End	62,629,648 bp
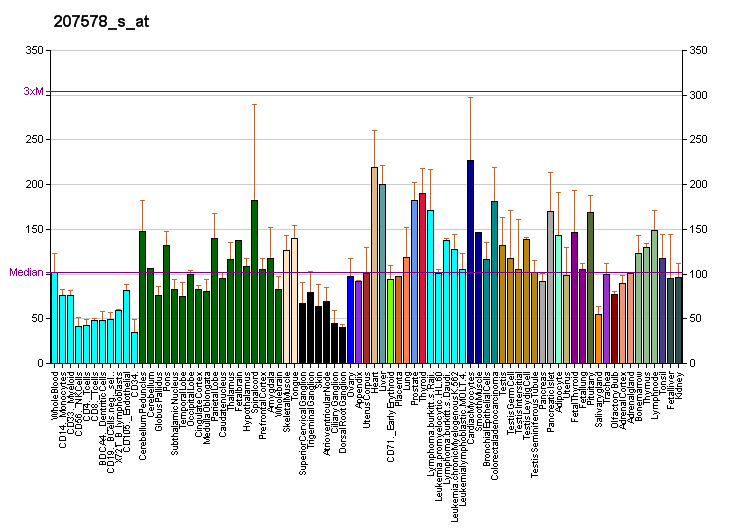

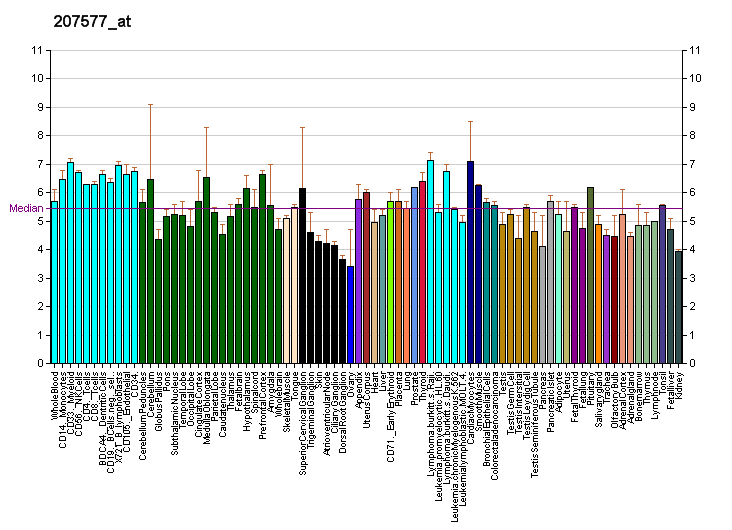

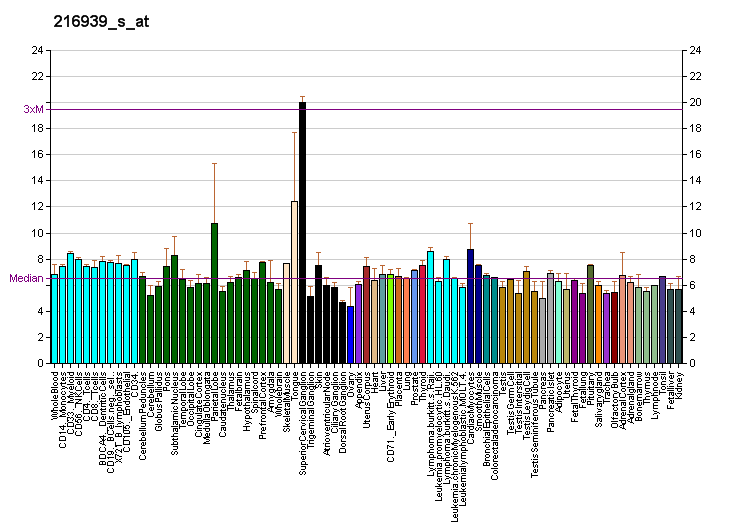
RNA expression pattern
Bgee	Human / Mouse (ortholog); Top expressed in: beta cell; triceps brachii muscle; glutes; testicle; external globus pallidus; vena cava; vastus lateralis muscle; pars reticulata; pars compacta; epithelium of nasopharynx / Top expressed in: lumbar spinal ganglion; mucosa of urinary bladder; transitional epithelium of urinary bladder; olfactory tubercle; left colon; Paneth cell; Region I of hippocampus proper; CA3 field; perirhinal cortex; intestinal villus; More reference expression data
BioGPS	More reference expression data
Gene ontology
Molecular function	G protein-coupled receptor activity; signal transducer activity; G protein-coupled serotonin receptor activity; trace-amine receptor activity; identical protein binding; neurotransmitter receptor activity; protein binding
Cellular component	cytoplasm; integral component of membrane; endosome; plasma membrane; integral component of plasma membrane; membrane; dendrite
Biological process	gamma-aminobutyric acid signaling pathway; G protein-coupled receptor signaling pathway; G protein-coupled receptor signaling pathway, coupled to cyclic nucleotide second messenger; regulation of appetite; signal transduction; chemical synaptic transmission; G protein-coupled serotonin receptor signaling pathway
Sources:Amigo / QuickGO
Orthologs
Databases	NCBI: entry; OMA: entry
Species	Human	Mouse
Entrez	3360	15562
Ensembl	ENSG00000164270	ENSMUSG00000026322
UniProt	Q13639	P97288
RefSeq (mRNA)	NM_000870; NM_001040169; NM_001040172; NM_001040173; NM_001040174 NM_001286410; NM_199453	NM_008313; NM_001364956; NM_001364957; NM_001364958; NM_001364959
RefSeq (protein)	NP_000861; NP_001035259; NP_001035262; NP_001035263; NP_001273339 NP_955525	NP_032339; NP_001351885; NP_001351886; NP_001351887; NP_001351888
Location (UCSC)	Chr 5: 148.45 – 148.68 Mb	Chr 18: 62.46 – 62.63 Mb
PubMed search
- Wikidata
View/Edit Human	View/Edit Mouse

5-Hydroxytryptamine receptor 4 is a protein that in humans is encoded by the HTR4 gene.

== Function ==
This gene is a member of the family of human serotonin receptors, which are G protein-coupled receptors that stimulate cAMP production in response to serotonin (5-hydroxytryptamine). The gene product is a glycosylated transmembrane protein that functions in both the peripheral and central nervous system to modulate the release of various neurotransmitters. Multiple transcript variants encoding proteins with distinct C-terminal sequences have been described, but the full-length nature of some transcript variants has not been determined.

== Location ==
The receptor is located in the alimentary tract, urinary bladder, heart and adrenal gland as well as the central nervous system (CNS). In the CNS the receptor appears in the putamen, caudate nucleus, nucleus accumbens, globus pallidus, and substantia nigra, and to a lesser extent in the neocortex, raphe, pontine nuclei, and some areas of the thalamus. It has not been found in the cerebellum.

== Isoforms ==
Internalization is isoform-specific.

== Ligands ==
Several drugs that act as 5-HT_{4} selective agonists have recently been introduced into use in both scientific research and clinical medicine. Some drugs that act as 5-HT_{4} agonists are also active as 5-HT_{3} antagonists, such as metoclopramide, mosapride, renzapride, and zacopride, and so these compounds cannot be considered highly selective. Research in this area is ongoing. Amongst these agonists prucalopride has >150-fold higher affinity for 5-HT_{4} receptors than for other receptors.

SB-207,145 radiolabeled with carbon-11 is used as a radioligand for 5-HT_{4} in positron emission tomography studies in pigs and humans.

=== Agonists ===
- Cisapride
- Felcisetrag
- Metoclopramide
- Mosapride
- Naronapride
- Prucalopride
- Renzapride
- Sulpiride
- Tegaserod
- Tropisetron – partial agonist
- Usmarapride (SUVN-D4010) – partial agonist
- Zacopride
- BIMU-8
- CJ-033,466 – partial agonist
- ML-10302
- RS-67506
- RS-67333 – partial agonist
- SL65.0155 – partial agonist

=== Antagonists ===
- L-lysine
- Piboserod
- GR-113,808 (1-methyl-1H-indole-3-carboxylic acid, [1-[2-[(methylsulfonyl)amino]ethyl]-4-piperidinyl]methyl ester)
- GR-125,487
- RS-39604 (1-[4-Amino-5-chloro-2-(3,5-dimethoxyphenyl)methyloxy]-3-[1-[2-methylsulphonylamino]piperidin-4-yl]propan-1-one)
- SB-203,186
- SB-204,070
- ([Methoxy-^{11}C]1-butylpiperidin-4-yl)methyl 4-amino-3-methoxybenzoate
- Chamomile (ethanol extract)

== See also ==
- 5-HT receptor
- 5-HT_{1} receptor
- 5-HT_{2} receptor
- 5-HT_{3} receptor
- 5-HT_{5} receptor
- 5-HT_{6} receptor
- 5-HT_{7} receptor
