= Maritupirdine =

Chemical compound

Identifiers
- IUPAC name: 2,8-Dimethyl-5-(2-phenylethyl)-2,3,4,5-tetrahydro-1H-pyrido[4,3-b]indole
- CAS Number: 1025725-91-0 1061354-48-0 (hydrochloride)
- ChemSpider: 24643855
- UNII: 6MHR5IV28S
- ChEMBL: ChEMBL592752
- CompTox Dashboard (EPA): DTXSID901032403

Chemical and physical data
- Formula: C_{21}H_{24}N_{2}
- Molar mass: 304.437 g·mol^{−1}
- 3D model (JSmol): Interactive image
- SMILES: Cc1ccc2c(c1)c3c(n2CCc4ccccc4)CCN(C3)C
- InChI: InChI=1S/C21H24N2/c1-16-8-9-20-18(14-16)19-15-22(2)12-11-21(19)23(20)13-10-17-6-4-3-5-7-17/h3-9,14H,10-13,15H2,1-2H3; Key:IBUHDDLETPJVGP-UHFFFAOYSA-N

Maritupirdine (developmental code name AVN-101), a close structural analogue of latrepirdine, is a selective 5-HT_{6} receptor antagonist which is under development by Avineuro Pharmaceuticals for the treatment of Alzheimer's disease and anxiety disorders. As of November 2013, it was in phase II clinical trials for these indications.

It was approved in Russia on May 31, 2023 under the brand name Aviandr for the treatment of generalized anxiety disorder, mild-to-moderate anxiety conditions (stress reactions and adjustment disorders) and anxiety after COVID-19.

== See also ==
- List of investigational anxiolytics
- AVN-211
