= AVN-211 =

Chemical compound

Clinical data
- Other names: CD-008-0173

Identifiers
- IUPAC name: 5,7-dimethyl-2-(methylsulfanyl)-3-(phenylsulfonyl)pyrazolo[1,5-a]pyrimidine
- CAS Number: 1173103-84-8
- ChemSpider: 26387125
- UNII: L6B63H3RXJ
- ChEMBL: ChEMBL1668500
- CompTox Dashboard (EPA): DTXSID001032056

Chemical and physical data
- Formula: C_{15}H_{15}N_{3}O_{2}S_{2}
- Molar mass: 333.42 g·mol^{−1}
- 3D model (JSmol): Interactive image
- SMILES: Cc1cc(n2c(n1)c(c(n2)SC)S(=O)(=O)c3ccccc3)C
- InChI: InChI=1S/C15H15N3O2S2/c1-10-9-11(2)18-14(16-10)13(15(17-18)21-3)22(19,20)12-7-5-4-6-8-12/h4-9H,1-3H3; Key:KSAUCBGUWGWPDL-UHFFFAOYSA-N

AVN-211 (CD-008-0173) is a drug which acts as a highly selective 5-HT_{6} receptor antagonist and is under development by Avineuro Pharmaceuticals for the treatment of schizophrenia. In early 2011, it successfully completed phase IIa clinical trials, with benefits on positive symptoms and some procognitive effects observed, and in mid 2013, phase IIb clinical trials for schizophrenia began. Avineuro Pharmaceuticals also expressed intention to start clinical trials of AVN-211 for Alzheimer's disease in 2015.

== See also ==
- List of investigational antipsychotics
- AVN-101
