= Piboserod =

Chemical compound

Clinical data
- Trade names: Serlipet
- Routes of administration: Oral
- ATC code: none

Legal status
- Legal status: Clinical phase II

Identifiers
- IUPAC name: N-((1-Butyl-4-piperidyl)-methyl)-3,4-dihydro-2H-(1,3)oxazino(3,2-a)indole-10-carboxamide
- CAS Number: 152811-62-6
- PubChem CID: 177336
- IUPHAR/BPS: 225
- ChemSpider: 154413
- UNII: 4UQ3S81B25
- ChEMBL: ChEMBL356359
- CompTox Dashboard (EPA): DTXSID60165129

Chemical and physical data
- Formula: C_{22}H_{31}N_{3}O_{2}
- Molar mass: 369.509 g·mol^{−1}
- 3D model (JSmol): Interactive image
- SMILES: CCCCN1CCC(CNC(=O)c2c3n(c4ccccc24)CCCO3)CC1
- InChI: InChI=1S/C22H31N3O2/c1-2-3-11-24-13-9-17(10-14-24)16-23-21(26)20-18-7-4-5-8-19(18)25-12-6-15-27-22(20)25/h4-5,7-8,17H,2-3,6,9-16H2,1H3,(H,23,26); Key:KVCSJPATKXABRQ-UHFFFAOYSA-N

Piboserod is a selective 5-HT_{4} receptor antagonist which was marketed and manufactured by GlaxoSmithKline (GSK) under the trade name Serlipet for the management of atrial fibrillation and irritable bowel syndrome. In 2007 the Norwegian company Bio-Medisinsk Innovasjon AS (BMI) completed a clinical phase II study to investigate the effect of piboserod in patients with chronic heart failure.

== Mechanism of action ==
In 2002 a research group at the University of Oslo discovered that muscles from the ventricle of failing hearts have increased responsiveness to serotonin. They later demonstrated that the effect was due to an expression of functional 5-HT_{4} receptors in the failing muscle. On the basis of these findings, and in analogy with the success of betablockers in heart failure, the group made the hypothesis that 5-HT_{4} receptor antagonists could be useful to treat heart failure. Their hypothesis was tested in animal models of heart failure with positive results.
