= SB-699551 =

Chemical compound

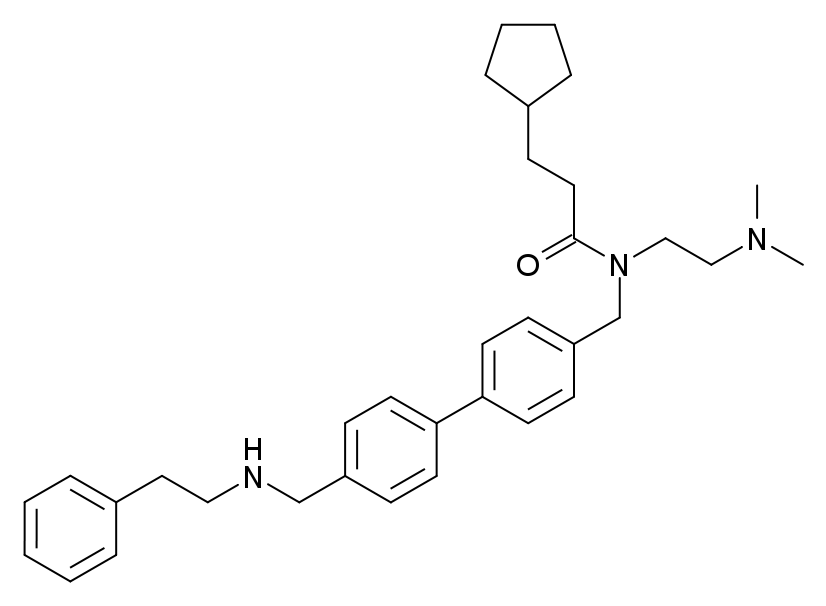

Identifiers
- IUPAC name: 3-cyclopentyl-N-[2-(dimethylamino)ethyl]-N-[(4'-([(2-phenylethyl)amino]methyl)-4-biphenylyl)methyl]propanamide
- CAS Number: 791789-61-2
- PubChem CID: 11168182
- ChemSpider: 9343277
- UNII: 3FN59X9DPR
- CompTox Dashboard (EPA): DTXSID90457468

Chemical and physical data
- Formula: C_{34}H_{45}N_{3}O
- Molar mass: 511.754 g·mol^{−1}
- 3D model (JSmol): Interactive image
- SMILES: C2CCCC2CCC(=O)N(CCN(C)C)Cc(cc3)ccc3-c(cc1)ccc1CNCCc4ccccc4
- InChI: InChI=1S/C34H45N3O/c1-36(2)24-25-37(34(38)21-16-28-10-6-7-11-28)27-31-14-19-33(20-15-31)32-17-12-30(13-18-32)26-35-23-22-29-8-4-3-5-9-29/h3-5,8-9,12-15,17-20,28,35H,6-7,10-11,16,21-27H2,1-2H3; Key:SEQAMPXQRKYYQF-UHFFFAOYSA-N

SB-699551 is a drug which was the first compound developed to act as a selective antagonist for the serotonin receptor 5-HT_{5A}, with selectivity of around 100x over other serotonin receptor subtypes. Multiple therapeutic roles have been suggested for 5-HT_{5A} ligands due to the presence of this receptor in several areas of the brain, but research is still at an early stage, In animal studies, SB-699551 was found to block cue-mediated responding to LSD, again suggesting an antipsychotic type of activity. It also reduces the viability of certain types of cancer cells in vitro, suggesting the 5-HT_{5A} receptor as a possible target for novel chemotherapy drugs.
