= Iodocyanopindolol =

Drug

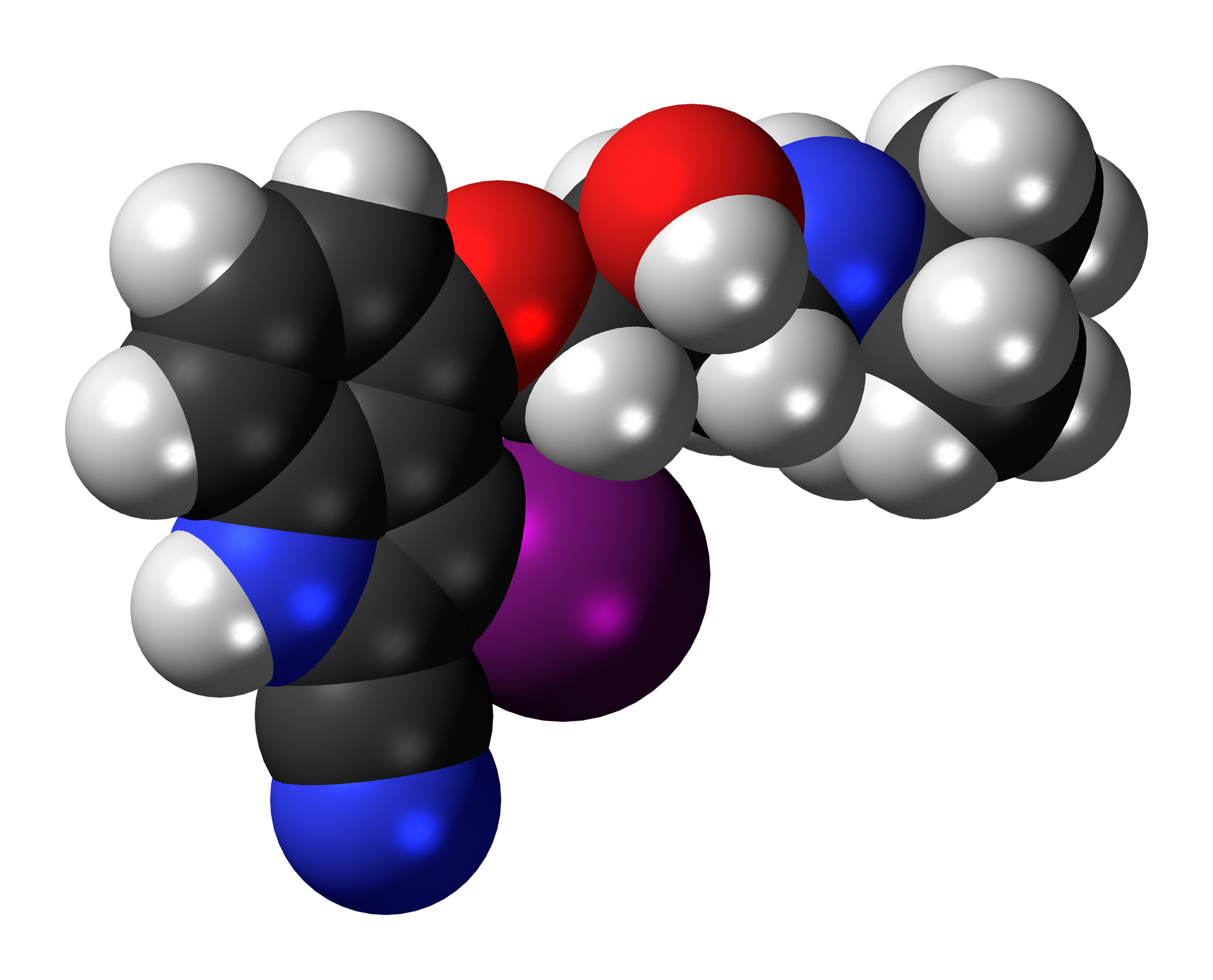

Clinical data
- Other names: ICYP
- ATC code: None

Identifiers
- IUPAC name: (RS)-4-[3-[(1,1-Dimethylethyl)amino]-2-hydroxypropoxy]-3-iodo-1H-indole-2-carbonitrile
- CAS Number: 85124-14-7
- PubChem CID: 68618
- IUPHAR/BPS: 7583
- ChemSpider: 162764
- UNII: JG83U2H5YQ
- ChEBI: CHEBI:73370
- ChEMBL: ChEMBL210309
- CompTox Dashboard (EPA): DTXSID501001074 DTXSID901003484, DTXSID501001074

Chemical and physical data
- Formula: C_{16}H_{20}IN_{3}O_{2}
- Molar mass: 413.259 g·mol^{−1}
- 3D model (JSmol): Interactive image
- Chirality: Racemic mixture
- SMILES: IC1=C(C#N)NC2=CC=CC(OCC(CNC(C)(C)C)O)=C21
- InChI: InChI=1S/C16H20IN3O2/c1-16(2,3)19-8-10(21)9-22-13-6-4-5-11-14(13)15(17)12(7-18)20-11/h4-6,10,19-21H,8-9H2,1-3H3; Key:JBLUMBNIBNHRSO-UHFFFAOYSA-N

Iodocyanopindolol (INN) is a drug related to pindolol which acts as both a β_{1} adrenoreceptor antagonist and a 5-HT_{1A} receptor antagonist. Its ^{125}I radiolabelled derivative has been widely used in mapping the distribution of beta adrenoreceptors in the body.

It also antagonizes 5-HT1A and 5-HT1B serotonin receptors, making it a versatile radioligand for studying both adrenergic and serotonergic systems.
