= SB-399885 =

Chemical compound

Identifiers
- IUPAC name: N-(3,5-Dichloro-2-methoxyphenyl)-4-methoxy-3-(1-piperazinyl)benzenesulfonamide
- CAS Number: 402713-80-8
- PubChem CID: 6918649
- IUPHAR/BPS: 3241
- ChemSpider: 5293842
- UNII: 5BH7TN3FWY
- ChEMBL: ChEMBL1210710
- CompTox Dashboard (EPA): DTXSID60437717

Chemical and physical data
- Formula: C_{18}H_{21}Cl_{2}N_{3}O_{4}S
- Molar mass: 446.34 g·mol^{−1}
- 3D model (JSmol): Interactive image
- SMILES: C3CNCCN3c2cc(ccc2OC)S(=O)(=O)Nc(c1OC)cc(Cl)cc1Cl
- InChI: InChI=1S/C18H21Cl2N3O4S/c1-26-17-4-3-13(11-16(17)23-7-5-21-6-8-23)28(24,25)22-15-10-12(19)9-14(20)18(15)27-2/h3-4,9-11,21-22H,5-8H2,1-2H3; Key:ATKZKAYWARYLBW-UHFFFAOYSA-N

SB-399885 is a drug which is used in scientific research. It acts as a potent, selective and orally active 5-HT_{6} receptor antagonist, with a Ki of 9.0nM. SB-399885 and other 5-HT_{6} antagonists show nootropic effects in animal studies, as well as antidepressant and anxiolytic effects which are comparable to and synergistic with drugs such as imipramine and diazepam, and have been proposed as potential novel treatments for cognitive disorders such as schizophrenia and Alzheimer's disease.
