= SB-357134 =

Chemical compound

Identifiers
- IUPAC name: N-(2,5-Dibromo-3-fluorophenyl)-4-methoxy-3-(1-piperazinyl)benzenesulfonamide
- CAS Number: 219963-52-7
- PubChem CID: 6918553
- IUPHAR/BPS: 3235
- ChemSpider: 5293750
- ChEMBL: ChEMBL329383
- CompTox Dashboard (EPA): DTXSID301026949

Chemical and physical data
- Formula: C_{17}H_{18}Br_{2}FN_{3}O_{3}S
- Molar mass: 523.22 g·mol^{−1}
- 3D model (JSmol): Interactive image
- SMILES: C3CNCCN3c1cc(ccc1OC)S(=O)(=O)Nc2cc(Br)cc(F)c2Br
- InChI: InChI=1S/C17H18Br2FN3O3S/c1-26-16-3-2-12(10-15(16)23-6-4-21-5-7-23)27(24,25)22-14-9-11(18)8-13(20)17(14)19/h2-3,8-10,21-22H,4-7H2,1H3; Key:BLWHAZZXRHTFJE-UHFFFAOYSA-N

SB-357134 is a drug which is used in scientific research. It acts as a potent, selective and orally active 5-HT_{6} receptor antagonist. SB-357134 and other 5-HT_{6} antagonists show nootropic effects in animal studies, and have been proposed as potential novel treatments for cognitive disorders such as schizophrenia and Alzheimer's disease.
