= MS-245 =

Chemical compound

Clinical data
- ATC code: none

Identifiers
- IUPAC name: 2-[5-methoxy-1-(phenylsulfonyl)-1H-indol-3-yl]-N,N-dimethylethanamine
- CAS Number: 263384-65-2
- PubChem CID: 6918542
- ChemSpider: 5293739
- UNII: L7TKH887Y7
- CompTox Dashboard (EPA): DTXSID501027131

Chemical and physical data
- Formula: C_{19}H_{22}N_{2}O_{3}S
- Molar mass: 358.46 g·mol^{−1}
- 3D model (JSmol): Interactive image
- SMILES: COc2cc1c(CCN(C)C)cn(c1cc2)S(=O)(=O)c3ccccc3
- InChI: InChI=1S/C19H22N2O3S/c1-20(2)12-11-15-14-21(19-10-9-16(24-3)13-18(15)19)25(22,23)17-7-5-4-6-8-17/h4-10,13-14H,11-12H2,1-3H3; Key:AIJIQCBYMBZLJD-UHFFFAOYSA-N

MS-245 is a tryptamine derivative used in scientific research. It acts as a selective 5-HT_{6} receptor antagonist with a K_{i} of 2.3 nM, and was derived through structure-activity relationship development of the selective 5-HT_{6} agonist EMDT. It has been used as a lead compound for further development of tryptamine-derived 5-HT_{6} antagonists. In animal studies it has been shown to boost the activity of, but not substitute for, both amphetamine and nicotine.

== See also ==
- EMDT
