= RS-67333 =

Chemical compound

Identifiers
- IUPAC name: 1-(4-amino-5-chloro-2-methoxyphenyl)-3-(1-butyl-4-piperidinyl)-1-propanone
- CAS Number: 160845-95-4
- PubChem CID: 183782
- ChemSpider: 159808
- UNII: 39N8XG5C9A
- CompTox Dashboard (EPA): DTXSID90167010

Chemical and physical data
- Formula: C_{19}H_{29}ClN_{2}O_{2}
- Molar mass: 352.90 g·mol^{−1}
- 3D model (JSmol): Interactive image
- SMILES: C(CCC1CCN(CC1)CCCC)(=O)c1c(cc(c(c1)Cl)N)OC
- InChI: InChI=1S/C19H29ClN2O2/c1-3-4-9-22-10-7-14(8-11-22)5-6-18(23)15-12-16(20)17(21)13-19(15)24-2/h12-14H,3-11,21H2,1-2H3; Key:JBHLYIVFFLNISJ-UHFFFAOYSA-N

RS-67,333 is a drug which has been investigated as a potential rapid-acting antidepressant, nootropic, and treatment for Alzheimer's disease. It is a high-affinity 5-HT4 receptor partial agonist, as well as a sigma receptor ligand of both subtypes to a lesser extent.
