= Latrepirdine =

Antihistamine drug

Clinical data
- Trade names: Dimebon
- Other names: BXCL-502; BXCL502
- Routes of administration: Oral
- ATC code: None

Legal status
- Legal status: In general: ℞ (Prescription only)

Identifiers
- IUPAC name: 2,3,4,5-tetrahydro-2,8-dimethyl-5-(2-(6-methyl-3-pyridyl)ethyl)-1H-pyrido(4,3-b)indole
- CAS Number: 3613-73-8
- PubChem CID: 197033
- ChemSpider: 170644
- UNII: OD9237K1Z6
- KEGG: D09917
- ChEBI: CHEBI:92976
- CompTox Dashboard (EPA): DTXSID20189705
- ECHA InfoCard: 100.119.053

Chemical and physical data
- Formula: C_{21}H_{25}N_{3}
- Molar mass: 319.452 g·mol^{−1}
- 3D model (JSmol): Interactive image
- SMILES: CC1=CC2=C(C=C1)N(C3=C2CN(CC3)C)CCC4=CN=C(C=C4)C
- InChI: InChI=1S/C21H25N3/c1-15-4-7-20-18(12-15)19-14-23(3)10-9-21(19)24(20)11-8-17-6-5-16(2)22-13-17/h4-7,12-13H,8-11,14H2,1-3H3; Key:JNODQFNWMXFMEV-UHFFFAOYSA-N

Latrepirdine (INN, also known as dimebolin and sold as Dimebon) is an antihistamine drug which has been used clinically in Russia since 1983.

Research was conducted in both Russia and western nations into potential applications as a neuroprotective drug to treat Alzheimer's disease and, possibly, as a nootropic, as well. After a major phase III clinical trial for Alzheimer's disease (AD) treatment failed to show any benefit, three other AD trials continued. Major industry-based development in this indication essentially stopped after another Phase III trial suffered the same fate in 2012. Latrepirdine failed in the phase III trial for Huntington's disease.

== Uses ==
Latrepirdine is an orally active, small molecule compound that has been shown to inhibit brain cell death in animal models of Alzheimer's disease and Huntington's disease. Research suggests it may also have cognition-enhancing effects in healthy individuals, in the absence of neurodegenerative disease pathology. However, because of negative results in human clinical trials, the drug remains unlicensed for any neurodegenerative condition.

== Clinical trials ==
=== Alzheimer's disease ===
Latrepirdine attracted renewed interest in 2009 after being shown in small preclinical trials to have positive effects on persons suffering from Alzheimer's disease. Animal studies showing potential beneficial effects on Alzheimer's disease models were shown in Russian research in 2000. Preliminary results from human trials have also been promising. In an initial six-month phase II trial, results have shown significant improvement over placebo at 12 months. Latrepirdine showed promising results in a phase III-equivalent, double-blind trial in Russia with mild–moderate stage patients. In April 2009, Pfizer and Medivation initiated a phase III trial (CONCERT study) aiming for FDA approval. In March 2010, Pfizer announced that this clinical trial failed to show any benefit for the treatment of Alzheimer's disease patients.

Numerous phase III trials for AD were recruiting in 2009.

In July 2009, Pfizer and Medivation announced that "latrepirdine" was to be the proposed international nonproprietary name for latrepirdine for the treatment of Alzheimer's.

In March 2010, the results of a clinical trial phase III were released; the investigational Alzheimer's disease drug dimebon failed in the pivotal CONNECTION trial of patients with mild-to-moderate disease. Pfizer had paid $225 million after bidding against several pharmaceutical companies to purchase the rights to Dimebon.

With CONCERT, the remaining Pfizer and Medivation Phase III trial for latrepirdine in Alzheimer's disease failed in 2012, effectively ending the development in this indication.

A Cochrane meta-analysis of the three pivotal phase III efficacy trials found no significant effect of latrepirdine on cognition and function in mild-to-moderate Alzheimer's patients, though there appears to be a modest benefit for overall behavior disturbances. Latrepirdine thus failed to alter the existing pharmacologic management of Alzheimer's disease.

=== Huntington's disease ===
In April 2011, latrepirdine failed in a phase III clinical trial of patients affected with Huntington's disease. The trial was sponsored by Medivation Inc. and Pfizer.

== Pharmacology ==
Latrepirdine appears to operate through multiple mechanisms of action, both blocking the action of neurotoxic beta-amyloid proteins and inhibiting L-type calcium channels, modulating the action of AMPA and NMDA glutamate receptors, and may exert a neuroprotective effect by blocking a novel target that involves mitochondrial pores, which are believed to play a role in the cell death that is associated with neurodegenerative diseases and the aging process. It also blocks a number of other receptors, including α-adrenergic, 5-HT_{2C}, 5-HT_{5A}, and 5-HT_{6}. Notably, latrepirdine lacks any anticholinergic effects.

== See also ==
- List of investigational agitation drugs
- Cerlapirdine
- Idalopirdine
- List of Russian drugs
