= 5-HT6 receptor =

Protein found in humans

HTR6

Identifiers
- Aliases: HTR6, 5-HT6, 5-HT6R, 5-HT6 receptor, 5-hydroxytryptamine receptor 6
- External IDs: OMIM: 601109; MGI: 1196627; GeneCards: HTR6

Gene location (Human)
Chr.	Chromosome 1 (human)
Band	1p36.13	Start	19,664,875 bp
Band	1p36.13	End	19,680,966 bp

Gene location (Mouse)
Chr.	Chromosome 4 (mouse)
Band	4 D3|4 70.57 cM	Start	138,788,419 bp
Band	4 D3|4 70.57 cM	End	138,802,881 bp
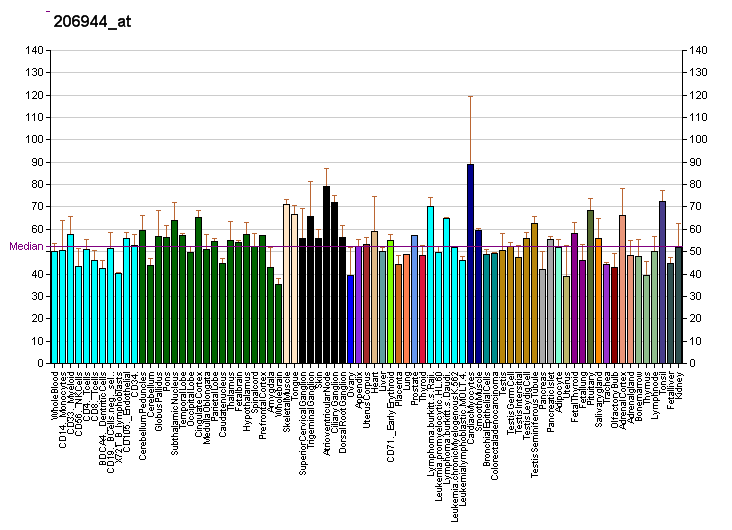
RNA expression pattern
Bgee	Human / Mouse (ortholog); Top expressed in: beta cell; Brodmann area 10; pancreatic ductal cell; frontal pole; mucosa of urinary bladder; middle frontal gyrus; external globus pallidus; body of tongue; pericardium; inferior ganglion of vagus nerve / Top expressed in: lumbar subsegment of spinal cord; superior frontal gyrus; primary visual cortex; dentate gyrus of hippocampal formation granule cell; ventricular zone; cerebellar cortex; hippocampus proper; neck; digastric muscle; olfactory bulb; More reference expression data
BioGPS	More reference expression data
Gene ontology
Molecular function	histamine receptor activity; protein binding; G protein-coupled receptor activity; signal transducer activity; neurotransmitter receptor activity; G protein-coupled serotonin receptor activity
Cellular component	integral component of membrane; plasma membrane; integral component of plasma membrane; cilium; membrane; dendrite
Biological process	G protein-coupled receptor signaling pathway, coupled to cyclic nucleotide second messenger; cerebral cortex cell migration; positive regulation of TOR signaling; signal transduction; chemical synaptic transmission; G protein-coupled serotonin receptor signaling pathway; G protein-coupled receptor signaling pathway
Sources:Amigo / QuickGO
Orthologs
Databases	NCBI: entry; OMA: entry
Species	Human	Mouse
Entrez	3362	15565
Ensembl	ENSG00000158748	ENSMUSG00000028747
UniProt	P50406	Q9R1C8
RefSeq (mRNA)	NM_000871	NM_021358; NM_001377096
RefSeq (protein)	NP_000862	NP_067333; NP_001364025
Location (UCSC)	Chr 1: 19.66 – 19.68 Mb	Chr 4: 138.79 – 138.8 Mb
PubMed search
- Wikidata
View/Edit Human	View/Edit Mouse

The 5HT_{6} receptor is a subtype of 5HT receptor that binds the endogenous neurotransmitter serotonin (5-hydroxytryptamine, 5HT). It is a G protein-coupled receptor (GPCR) that is coupled to G_{s} and mediates excitatory neurotransmission. HTR6 denotes the human gene encoding for the receptor.

== Distribution ==
The 5HT_{6} receptor is expressed almost exclusively in the brain. It is distributed in various areas including, but not limited to, the olfactory tubercle, cerebral cortex (frontal and entorhinal regions), nucleus accumbens, striatum, caudate nucleus, hippocampus, and the molecular layer of the cerebellum. Based on its abundance in extrapyramidal, limbic, and cortical regions it can be suggested that the 5HT_{6} receptor plays a role in functions like motor control, emotionality, cognition, and memory.

== Function ==
Blockade of central 5HT_{6} receptors has been shown to increase glutamatergic and cholinergic neurotransmission in various brain areas, whereas activation enhances GABAergic signaling in a widespread manner. Antagonism of 5HT_{6} receptors also facilitates dopamine and norepinephrine release in the frontal cortex, while stimulation has the opposite effect.

=== As a drug target for antagonists ===
Despite the 5HT_{6} receptor having a functionally excitatory action, it is largely co-localized with GABAergic neurons and therefore produces an overall inhibition of brain activity. In parallel with this, 5HT_{6} antagonists are hypothesized to improve cognition, learning, and memory. Agents such as latrepirdine, idalopirdine (Lu AE58054), and intepirdine (SB-742,457/RVT-101) were evaluated as novel treatments for Alzheimer's disease and other forms of dementia. However, phase III trials of latrepirdine, idalopirdine, and intepirdine have failed to demonstrate efficacy.

5HT_{6} antagonists have also been shown to reduce appetite and produce weight loss, and as a result, PRX-07034, BVT-5,182, and BVT-74,316 are being investigated for the treatment of obesity.

=== As a drug target for agonists ===
Recently, the 5HT_{6} agonists WAY-181,187 and WAY-208,466 have been demonstrated to be active in rodent models of depression, anxiety, and obsessive–compulsive disorder (OCD), and such agents may be useful treatments for these conditions. Additionally, indirect 5HT_{6} activation may play a role in the therapeutic benefits of serotonergic antidepressants like the selective serotonin reuptake inhibitors (SSRIs) and tricyclic antidepressants (TCAs).

== Ligands ==
A large number of selective 5HT_{6} ligands have now been developed.

=== Agonists ===
==== Full agonists ====
- 2-Ethyl-5-methoxy-N,N-dimethyltryptamine (EMDT)
- WAY-181,187
- WAY-208,466
- N-(inden-5-yl)imidazothiazole-5-sulfonamide (43): K_{i} = 4.5nM, EC_{50} = 0.9nM, E_{max} = 98%
- E-6837 – Full agonist at human 5HT_{6} receptors

==== Partial agonists ====
- E-6801
- E-6837 – partial agonist at rat 5-HT_{6} receptors. Orally active in rats, and caused weight loss with chronic administration
- EMD-386,088 – potent partial agonist (EC_{50} = 1 nM) but non-selective
- LSD – E_{max} = 60%

=== Antagonists and inverse agonists ===
- ALX-1161
- AVN-211
- BVT-5182
- BVT-74316
- Cerlapirdine – selective
- EGIS-12233 – mixed 5HT_{6} / 5HT_{7} antagonist
- Idalopirdine (Lu AE58054) – selective
- Intepirdine (SB-742,457/RVT-101) – selective antagonist
- Landipirdine (RO-5025181, SYN-120)
- Latrepirdine (non-selective) and analogues
- Maritupirdine (AVN-101) – selective antagonist
- MS-245
- PRX-07034
- PZKKN-94
- SB-258,585
- SB-271,046
- SB-357,134
- SB-399,885
- SGS 518 Fb: [445441-26-9]
- Ro 04-6790
- Ro-4368554
- Atypical antipsychotics (sertindole, olanzapine, asenapine, clozapine)
- WAY-255315 / SAM-315: K_{i} = 1.1 nM, IC_{50} = 13 nM
- Rosa rugosa extract

== Genetics ==
Polymorphisms in the HTR6 gene are associated with neuropsychiatric disorders. For example, an association between the C267T (rs1805054) polymorphism and Alzheimer's disease has been shown. Others have studied the polymorphism in relation to Parkinson's disease.

== See also ==
- 5-HT receptor
- 5-HT_{1} receptor
- 5-HT_{2} receptor
- 5-HT_{3} receptor
- 5-HT_{4} receptor
- 5-HT_{5} receptor
