= Serotonin 5-HT2A receptor antagonist =

Drug class

Serotonin 5-HT_{2A} receptor antagonist
- Drug class

Class identifiers
- Synonyms: 5-HT_{2A} antagonist
- Use: Insomnia, Parkinson's disease psychosis, hallucinogen antidotes (trip killers; against serotonergic psychedelics)
- Mechanism of action: Serotonin 5-HT_{2A} receptor antagonism
- Biological target: Serotonin 5-HT_{2A} receptor

Legal status

A serotonin 5-HT_{2A} receptor antagonist, or simply 5-HT_{2A} antagonist, is a drug which acts as an antagonist of the serotonin 5-HT_{2A} receptor. Aside from simple competitive antagonists, these drugs may also be inverse agonists of the serotonin 5-HT_{2A} receptor.

They include non-selective agents like atypical antipsychotics, tricyclic antidepressants (TCAs), tetracyclic antidepressants (TeCAs), and serotonin antagonists and reuptake inhibitors (SARIs) as well as selective agents. Examples of non-selective serotonin 5-HT_{2A} receptor antagonists include antipsychotics like chlorpromazine, clozapine, olanzapine, quetiapine, risperidone, spiperone (spiroperidol), and ziprasidone; antihistamines like cyproheptadine, hydroxyzine, and LY-2624803; TCAs like amitriptyline, clomipramine, doxepin, imipramine, iprindole, and trimipramine; TeCAs like mianserin, mirtazapine, and esmirtazapine; SARIs and related like trazodone, nefazodone, mepiprazole, niaprazine, and lubazodone; and others like adatanserin, cyclobenzaprine, deramciclane, DSP-6745, flibanserin, landipirdine, metergoline, metitepine (methiothepin), MT-1207, opiranserin, pizotifen, roluperidone, and XOB (ASR-6001). More selective serotonin 5-HT_{2A} receptor antagonists include 4-PhPr-PEA, 4F-4PP, AMDA, altanserin, butanserin, cinanserin, eplivanserin, fananserin, glemanserin, iferanserin, ketanserin, lidanserin, LY03017, metrenperone, NH130, pelanserin, pimavanserin, pirenperone, pruvanserin, R-96544, R-102444, remlifanserin, ritanserin, seganserin, setoperone, SpAMDA, and volinanserin. Peripherally selective or acting serotonin 5-HT_{2A} receptor antagonists are known as well and include BW-501C67, irindalone, naftidrofuryl, sarpogrelate, temanogrel, trelanserin, and xylamidine.

Selective serotonin 5-HT_{2A} receptor antagonists have been studied in the treatment of sleeping disorders such as insomnia, psychiatric disorders such as depression, anxiety, and schizophrenia, and for other indications. Several selective serotonin 5-HT_{2A} receptor antagonists reached and/or completed phase 3 clinical trials, including and eplivanserin, pimavanserin, pruvanserin, and volinanserin. However, all of them except pimavanserin were discontinued, with pimavanserin having been approved only for the treatment of Parkinson's disease psychosis. Though not approved for insomnia, selective serotonin 5-HT_{2A} receptor antagonists have been found to improve sleep and sleep quality, including increasing deep slow wave sleep (SWS) without affecting REM sleep.

Serotonin 5-HT_{2A} receptor antagonists are useful as so-called "trip killers" or hallucinogen antidotes in aborting or shortening the effects of serotonergic psychedelics like psilocybin, LSD, and mescaline. Ketanserin, risperidone, chlorpromazine, and cyproheptadine have all been formally studied and found to be effective for such purposes. Ketanserin, pimavanserin, and eplivanserin/volinanserin are under formal development and/or study for this use as well. In addition, recreational psychedelic users often use trip killers to abort psychedelic experiences, with frequent use of trazodone, quetiapine, olanzapine, and mirtazapine for these purposes having been documented.

== See also ==
- 5-HT_{2A} receptor § Antagonists
- Serotonin receptor antagonist
- Serotonin 5-HT_{2A} receptor agonist
- Locomotor activity § Serotonin receptor antagonists
