= Trip killer =

Drug that blocks hallucinogen effects

- Drug class
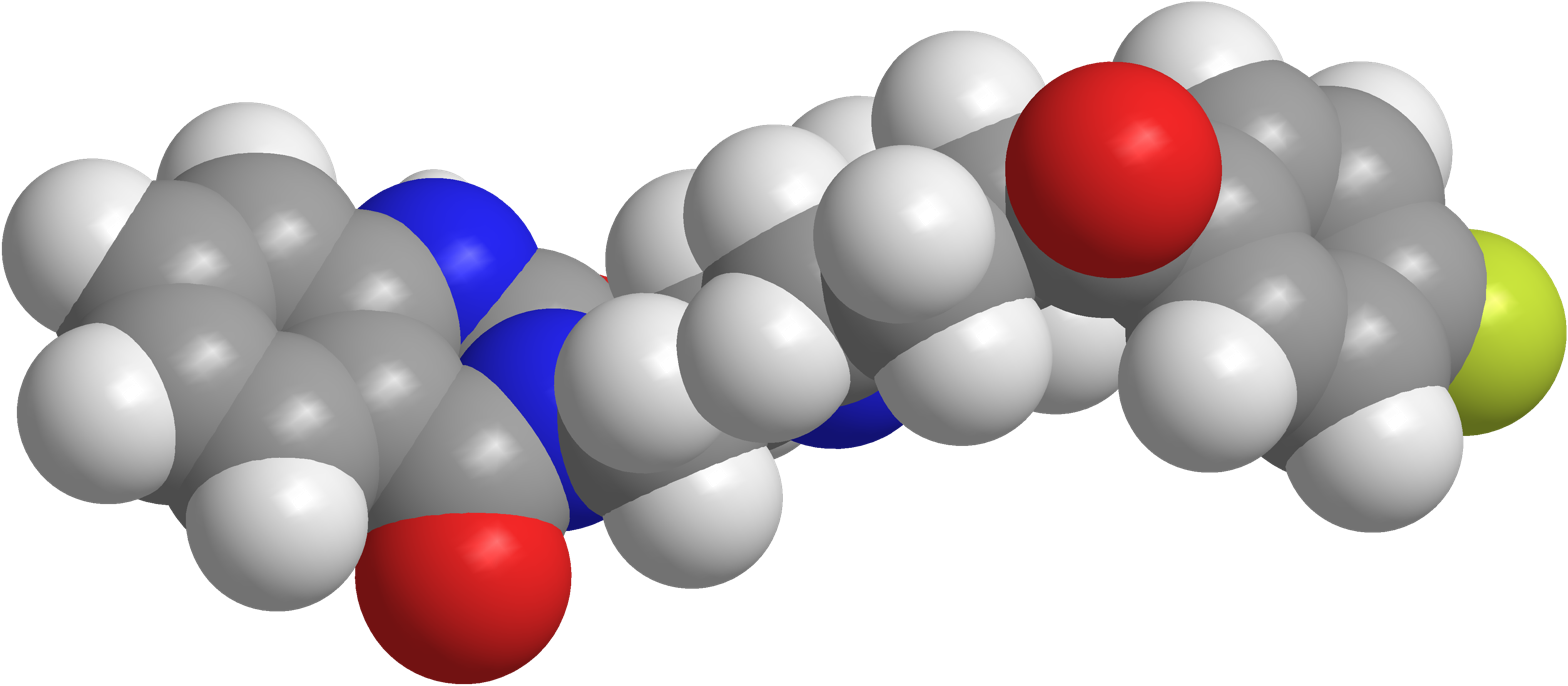
- Chemical structure of ketanserin, a serotonin 5-HT_{2A} receptor antagonist and one of the best-studied trip killers for serotonergic psychedelics.

Class identifiers
- Synonyms: Hallucinogen antidote; Hallucinogen antagonist; Psychedelic antidote; Psychedelic antagonist
- Use: Medical, harm reduction
- Mechanism of action: Various
- Biological target: Various
- Chemical class: Various

Legal status

A trip killer, also known as a hallucinogen antidote or hallucinogen antagonist, is a drug that aborts or reduces the effects of a hallucinogenic drug experience (or 'trip'). As there are different types of hallucinogens that work in different ways, there are different types of trip killers. Antipsychotics can block and reduce the effects of hallucinogens directly. Benzodiazepines provide adjunct anxiety relief and sedation.

Examples of trip killers, in the case of serotonergic psychedelics, include serotonin receptor antagonists, such as antipsychotics like risperidone and quetiapine and certain antidepressants like trazodone and mirtazapine, and benzodiazepines, for instance diazepam and alprazolam.

Trip killers can be used clinically to manage effects of hallucinogens, like hallucinogenic effects, anxiety, and psychomotor agitation, for instance in the emergency department and in the setting of psychedelic therapy. They are also sometimes used by recreational psychedelic users as a form of harm reduction to manage "bad trips" or challenging experiences, for instance emotionally difficult experiences with prominent anxiety. While used for harm-reduction purposes, this use of trip killers has raised concerns about safety and possible adverse effects.

== Serotonergic psychedelic antidotes ==
=== Serotonin 5-HT_{2A} receptor antagonists ===
Serotonergic psychedelics, such as psilocybin (found in psilocybin mushrooms), lysergic acid diethylamide (LSD), mescaline (found in peyote cacti), and dimethyltryptamine (DMT) (found in ayahuasca), mediate their hallucinogenic effects by acting as agonists of the serotonin 5-HT_{2A} receptor. As a result, serotonin 5-HT_{2A} receptor antagonists would theoretically be expected to block the hallucinogenic effects of serotonergic psychedelics. Accordingly, the serotonin 5-HT_{2A} receptor antagonists ketanserin, an antihypertensive agent, and risperidone, an antipsychotic, have been shown to block the effects of serotonergic psychedelics in clinical studies. This includes the effects of psilocybin, LSD, mescaline, and ayahuasca. Ketanserin is under formal clinical investigation as a "neutralizer" or "off-switch" for psychedelics. The more selective serotonin 5-HT_{2A} receptor antagonist pimavanserin is also being studied as a blocker of the effects of psychedelics. Eplivanserin/volinanserin, a combination of eplivanserin and volinanserin, is being studied for such uses as well.

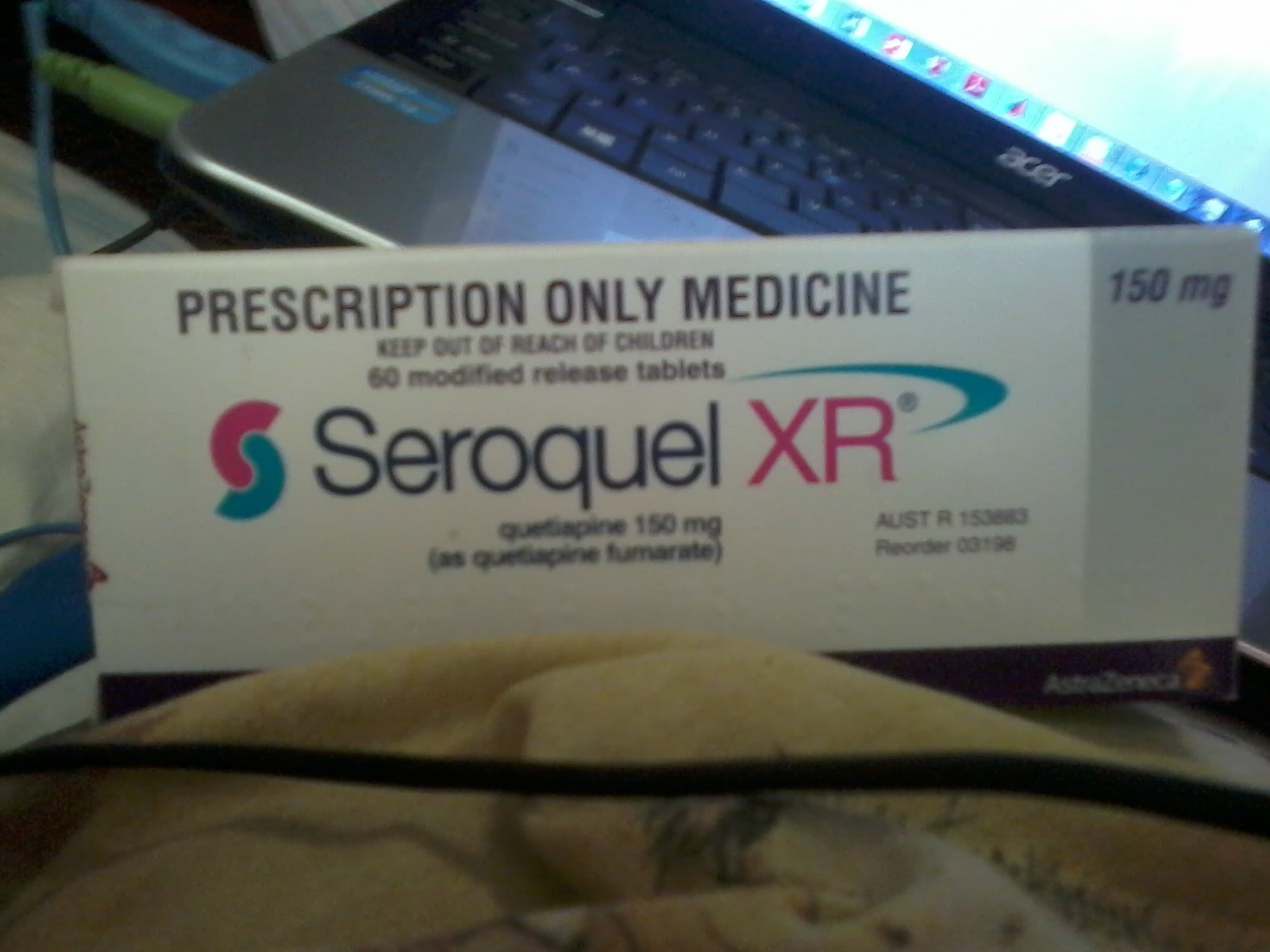
Quetiapine (Seroquel) is an antipsychotic used as a trip killer.

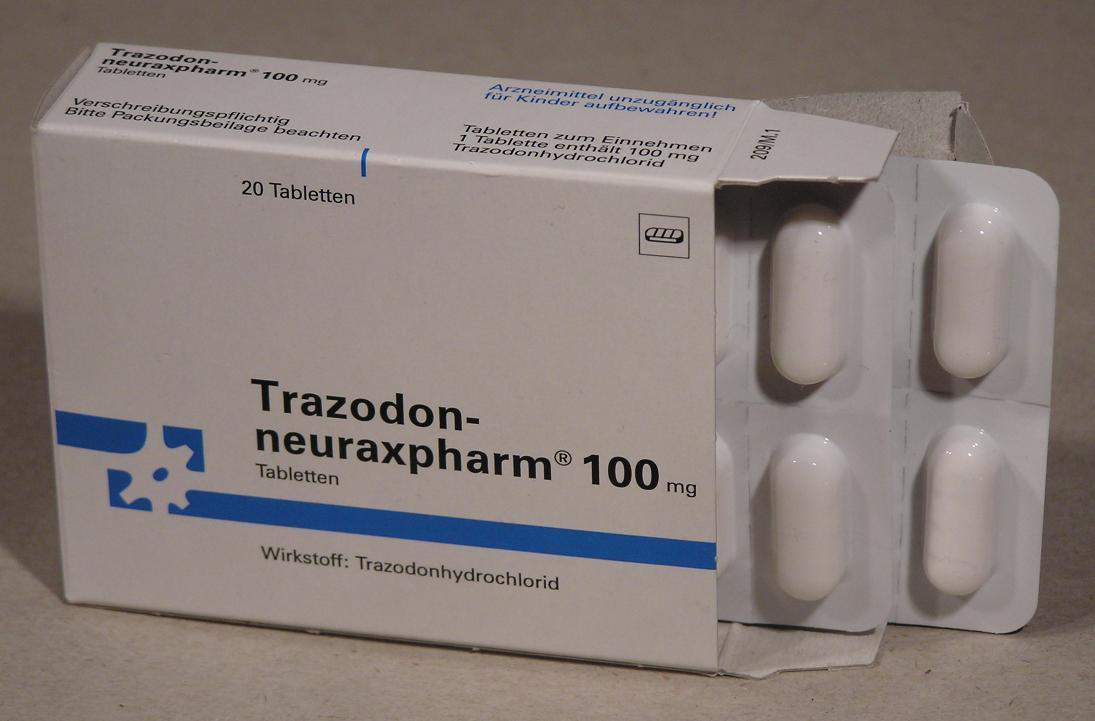
Trazodone is an antidepressant used as a trip killer.

Other potent serotonin 5-HT_{2A} receptor antagonists that may block or reduce the effects of serotonergic psychedelics besides the above-listed drugs include other antipsychotics like quetiapine, olanzapine, aripiprazole, and pipamperone, antidepressants like trazodone, mirtazapine, mianserin, nefazodone, and etoperidone, and the antimigraine agent pizotifen, among others. The typical antipsychotic chlorpromazine, which has significant but less-potent serotonin 5-HT_{2A} receptor antagonism than many other antipsychotics, has shown incomplete and inconsistent effects in reversing psychedelic effects in clinical studies, while the typical antipsychotic haloperidol, which is a dopamine D_{2} receptor antagonist but not a significant serotonin 5-HT_{2A} receptor antagonist, is ineffective and has actually been found to increase anxiety and dysphoria in the setting of psychedelic experiences. In spite of variably acting as serotonin 5-HT_{2A} receptor antagonists, tricyclic antidepressants (TCAs), including desipramine, imipramine, and clomipramine, have paradoxically been reported to potentiate the effects of serotonergic psychedelics rather than diminish them, albeit based on very limited data.

Cyproheptadine, a non-selective serotonin receptor antagonist including of the serotonin 5-HT_{2A} receptor, is used as an antidote in the treatment of serotonin syndrome (serotonin toxicity) caused by serotonergic drugs, including the toxicity of serotonergic psychedelics like the NBOMe drugs. A positron emission tomography (PET) study found 85 to 95% blockade of serotonin 5-HT_{2} receptors with cyproheptadine at a total dose of 12 to 18 mg/day. Certain other serotonin receptor antagonists, like chlorpromazine, have also been used to treat serotonin syndrome. Cyproheptadine might be useful as a serotonergic psychedelic antidote. However, a few small studies on cyproheptadine as an antagonist of the hallucinogenic effects of DMT have been inconsistent and inconclusive, as well as complicated by the drug's pronounced antihistamine sedative effects.

Serotonin 5-HT_{2A} receptor antagonists that have been found to block the psychedelic-like effects of serotonergic psychedelics in animals but have not necessarily been tested for such purposes in humans include cinanserin, clozapine, loxapine, metergoline, metitepine (methiothepin), mianserin, pirenperone, pizotifen, ritanserin, and seganserin, among others.

Non-hallucinogenic partial agonists of the serotonin 5-HT_{2A} receptor with sufficiently low intrinsic activity, such as 2-bromo-LSD (bromolysergide; BOL-148) and lisuride, are effective in blocking the hallucinogenic-related effects of psychedelics in animals and/or humans as well. However, it has been argued that lisuride may actually be a psychedelic or hallucinogen itself at sufficiently high doses in humans.

Serotonergic psychedelics are being developed as novel treatments for psychiatric disorders and other conditions such as depression. A practical limitation in terms of clinical use of many major psychedelics, for instance psilocybin, LSD, and mescaline, is their long durations of action (4–12 hours), which may require a whole day of clinical monitoring. In relation to this, shorter-acting psychedelics, like DMT, 5-MeO-DMT (mebufotenin), and bretisilocin (5-fluoro-MET; GM-2505), are also being investigated for potential therapeutic use. However, an alternative approach that is being investigated is use of serotonin 5-HT_{2A} receptor antagonists like ketanserin as trip killers to shorten the experiences of psychedelics. In a clinical trial, ketanserin given 1 hour after LSD shortened its duration from 8.5 hours to 3.5 hours (i.e., by roughly 60%). It did not modify the pharmacokinetics of LSD, and its side effects, such as nasal congestion, were minimal.

=== GABA_{A} receptor positive allosteric modulators ===
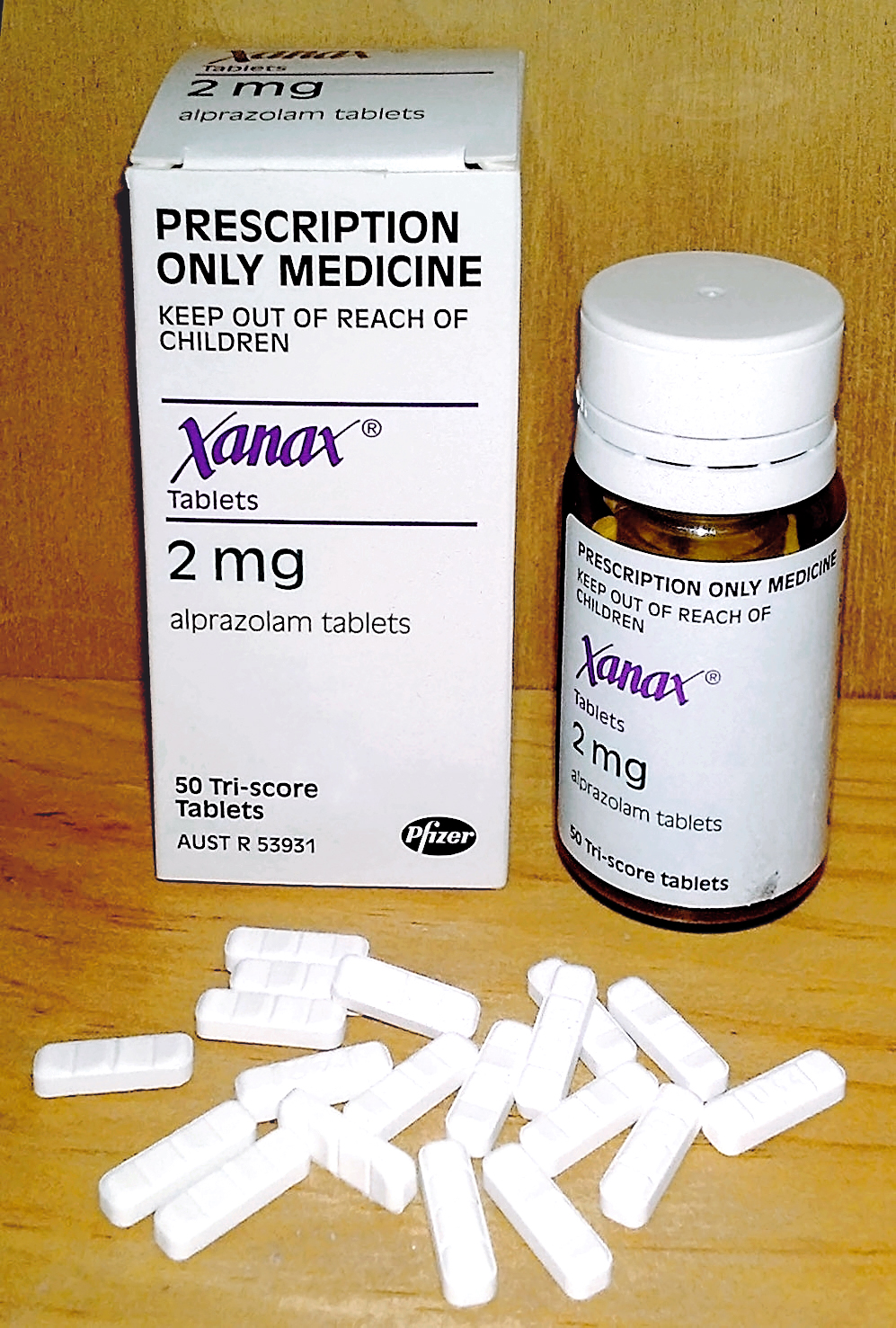
Alprazolam (Xanax) is a benzodiazepine used as a trip killer.

Benzodiazepines, such as diazepam and alprazolam, are sometimes used to manage the effects of serotonergic psychedelics, including clinically. They act as positive allosteric modulators of the GABA_{A} receptor, and do not specifically antagonize hallucinogenic effects (i.e., are not antidotes), but instead have anxiolytic, sedative, and memory-impairing effects that can lessen the negative effects of psychedelic experiences. Alcohol, which is also a GABA_{A} receptor positive allosteric modulator with similar effects, has been used for such purposes as well.

=== Other agents ===
Besides serotonin 5-HT_{2A} receptor antagonists, chronic use of other serotonergic drugs may also diminish the effects of serotonergic psychedelics. Examples include serotonin 5-HT_{1A} receptor agonists like buspirone, serotonin reuptake inhibitors such as selective serotonin reuptake inhibitors (SSRIs) like fluoxetine, paroxetine, and sertraline and serotonin–norepinephrine reuptake inhibitors (SNRIs) like venlafaxine, duloxetine, and milnacipran, and monoamine oxidase inhibitors (MAOIs) such as phenelzine, tranylcypromine, and moclobemide. Buspirone, a partial agonist of the serotonin 5-HT_{1A} receptor, has specifically been found to markedly attenuate the visual and certain other effects of psilocybin, although it did not completely block the hallucinogenic effects of psilocybin. The reduced effects of psychedelics in the case of concomitant drugs that elevate serotonin levels may be due to desensitization of serotonin 5-HT_{2A} receptors. In contrast to earlier studies however, other more recent studies have found that SSRIs like escitalopram may not diminish the hallucinogenic effects of psychedelics like psilocybin and DMT. Instead, in one study, escitalopram resulted in greater mystical experience, emotional breakthrough, and ego dissolution scores with DMT than in people not on escitalopram.

Although MAOIs can diminish the effects of serotonergic psychedelics, some serotonergic psychedelics, such as DMT, are highly susceptible substrates for monoamine oxidase (MAO), and hence can simultaneously be greatly potentiated by MAOIs (as in ayahuasca). The 2C drugs, such as 2C-B, 2C-I, and 2C-E, are also notable substrates of both MAO-A and MAO-B, and may likewise be greatly potentiated by MAOIs.

High-dose nicotinic acid (niacin, a B_{3} vitamer) was reported to reduce and block the effects of LSD in one early clinical study. However, a subsequent clinical study attempting to replicate the findings found that it was not effective for this purpose. Azacyclonol, a claimed ataractive (i.e., non-antipsychotic hallucination-suppressing medication) that is no longer marketed, likewise seems to be ineffective. Other non-serotonergic drugs that may block or reduce the effects of serotonergic psychedelics based on animal studies include AMPA receptor antagonists, metabotropic glutamate mGlu_{2} and mGlu_{3} receptor agonists, μ-opioid receptor agonists, and adenosine A_{1} receptor agonists.

Some drugs that have been reported to potentiate rather than inhibit the effects of serotonergic psychedelics include lithium, reserpine, pindolol, and methysergide. Pindolol, a beta blocker and serotonin 5-HT_{1A} receptor antagonist, has been reported to potentiate the hallucinogenic effects of DMT by 2- to 3-fold in humans. Methysergide has also been reported to greatly potentiate the effects of DMT. This drug was originally thought to be a potent serotonin antagonist, but is actually a serotonin receptor agonist and produces psychedelic effects itself at supratherapeutic doses. A high rate of seizures has been reported with the combination of lithium and psychedelics.

=== Use by recreational psychedelic users ===
Trip killers on Reddit
Drug	Dose
Alprazolam	0.5–4 mg
Diazepam	3–20 mg
Quetiapine	25–600 mg
Trazodone	50–150 mg

Recreational psychedelic users sometimes employ trip killers to abort psychedelic trips. The most commonly encountered putative trip killers in a 2024 online study of Reddit social media postings were the benzodiazepines alprazolam and diazepam, the antipsychotic quetiapine, the antidepressant trazodone, and alcohol. Others used less frequently included the benzodiazepines lorazepam, clonazepam, and etizolam, the antipsychotic olanzapine, and the antidepressant mirtazapine, among others. While employed by recreational users for harm-reduction purposes, the use of trip killers to abort the effects of psychedelics is not fully characterized and could pose medical risks. In addition, doses of trip killers used by recreational psychedelic users may be non-optimal or excessive and increase risks.

== Antidotes of other hallucinogens ==
Cannabinoid CB_{1} receptor antagonists like rimonabant, drinabant, surinabant, and selonabant have been found to block or reduce the psychoactive effects of cannabinoids in clinical studies and could be useful as antidotes against cannabinoid toxicity. Likewise, the hallucinogenic and other effects of κ-opioid receptor agonists like salvinorin A (found in Salvia divinorum), butorphanol, and pentazocine have been shown to be blocked by the non-selective opioid receptor antagonist naltrexone in clinical studies. Although clinical management of antimuscarinic deliriant intoxication and poisoning, for instance due to scopolamine, is usually supportive, acetylcholinesterase inhibitors, such as physostigmine, have sometimes been used in this context as well. Benzodiazepines and antipsychotics have also been used in such situations.

Although trip killers exist for certain types of hallucinogens, antidotes do not exist for all types of hallucinogens, for instance NMDA receptor antagonist dissociatives like ketamine and phencyclidine (PCP). NMDA receptor agonists, which theoretically could reverse the effects of NMDA receptor antagonists, can produce excitotoxic neurotoxicity and convulsions, which restricts their potential medical use. In any case, benzodiazepines can be useful in managing dissociative intoxication, but can also augment sedation and associated risks. As with NMDA receptor antagonists, there is no antidote for Amanita muscaria intoxication, in which the hallucinogenic GABA_{A} receptor agonist muscimol is the active constituent.

Entactogens like MDMA and MDA are generally only mildly hallucinogenic at best, but use of "trip killers" to reverse the effects of these drugs has also been described. Entactogens act primarily as serotonin releasing agents that indirectly activate serotonin receptors and require entry into serotonergic neurons via the serotonin transporter (SERT) to induce their entactogenic effects. Serotonin reuptake inhibitors (SRIs), for instance selective serotonin reuptake inhibitors (SSRIs) like fluoxetine and citalopram and serotonin–norepinephrine reuptake inhibitors (SNRIs) like duloxetine, can markedly block or abolish the serotonin release induced by entactogens by preventing their transport into these neurons, and thus can strongly reduce most of their subjective effects in humans. The serotonin 5-HT_{2A} receptor antagonist ketanserin has also been found to partially reduce some of the subjective effects of MDMA, particularly its perceptual effects, whereas the serotonin 5-HT_{1A} receptor antagonist pindolol was largely ineffective. Non-selective serotonin receptor antagonists like cyproheptadine have been used in the clinical management of serotonin toxicity induced by MDMA, for instance in overdose or precipitated by drug interactions like with monoamine oxidase inhibitors (MAOIs).

== See also ==
- Psychedelic drug § Interactions
- Psilocybin § Interactions
