= Naftidrofuryl =

Chemical compound

Clinical data
- Trade names: Praxilene, others
- Other names: Nafronyl; Naftidrofurile; Naftifurine; EU-1806; EU1806; LS-121; LS121
- AHFS/Drugs.com: International Drug Names
- Routes of administration: Oral
- Drug class: Serotonin 5-HT_{2A} receptor antagonist; Vasodilator
- ATC code: C04AX21 (WHO)

Legal status
- Legal status: UK: POM (Prescription only)

Pharmacokinetic data
- Bioavailability: 20–78% (in different studies)
- Protein binding: 80%
- Metabolism: Hepatic
- Onset of action: 0.8–1.0 hours (T_{max})
- Elimination half-life: 1.2–2 hours
- Duration of action: 2–3 hours

Identifiers
- IUPAC name: (RS)-2-(diethylamino)ethyl 3-(1-naphthyl)-2-(tetrahydrofuran-2-ylmethyl)propanoate
- CAS Number: 31329-57-4
- PubChem CID: 4417
- ChemSpider: 4264
- UNII: 42H8PQ0NMJ
- ChEMBL: ChEMBL1620794
- CompTox Dashboard (EPA): DTXSID3023344
- ECHA InfoCard: 100.045.960

Chemical and physical data
- Formula: C_{24}H_{33}NO_{3}
- Molar mass: 383.532 g·mol^{−1}
- 3D model (JSmol): Interactive image
- SMILES: O=C(OCCN(CC)CC)C(Cc2c1ccccc1ccc2)CC3OCCC3
- InChI: InChI=1S/C24H33NO3/c1-3-25(4-2)14-16-28-24(26)21(18-22-12-8-15-27-22)17-20-11-7-10-19-9-5-6-13-23(19)20/h5-7,9-11,13,21-22H,3-4,8,12,14-18H2,1-2H3; Key:KBAFPSLPKGSANY-UHFFFAOYSA-N

Naftidrofuryl, also known as nafronyl and sold under the brand name Praxilene among others, is a serotonin 5-HT_{2} receptor antagonist which is used as a vasodilator in the treatment of peripheral and cerebral vascular disorders. It is taken orally.

== Medical uses ==
Naftidrofuryl is used as a vasodilator in the treatment of peripheral and cerebral vascular disorders. It is also licensed for the treatment of intermittent claudication due to peripheral arterial disease. Historically, it has been used to treat sudden idiopathic hearing loss and acute tinnitus. Naftidrofuryl may be effective for relieving the pain of muscle cramps.

== Adverse effects ==
Naftidrofuryl has been associated with nausea, abdominal pain, and rash. Rarely, hepatitis and liver failure have been reported.

== Pharmacology ==
=== Pharmacodynamics ===
Naftidrofuryl acts as a selective antagonist of 5-HT_{2} receptors (with action as an inverse agonist of the 5-HT_{2A} receptor specifically characterized).

=== Pharmacokinetics ===
The oral bioavailability of naftidrofuryl is 20 to 78% in different studies. Its time to peak levels is 0.8 to 1.0 hours. There is some evidence that naftidrofuryl crosses the blood–brain barrier and penetrates into the central nervous system. The drug's plasma protein binding is 80%. It is metabolized in the liver. The elimination half-life of naftidrofuryl is 1.2 to 2 hours. Its half-life is longer in the elderly than in younger people. The drug's duration of effects is 2 to 3 hours and closely parallels circulating levels of naftidrofuryl.

== History ==
Naftidrofuryl was first described in the scientific literature by at least 1966.

== Society and culture ==
=== Names ===
Naftidrofuryl is the generic name of the drug and its (INN, BAN, DCF, and JAN. It is also known as naftidrofurile (DCIT) or as nafronyl (USAN. Naftidrofuryl is marketed under a variety of trade names, including Artocoron, Azunaftil, Di-Actane, Dusodril, Enelbin, Frilix, Gevatran, Iridus, Iridux, Luctor, Nafti, Naftilong, Naftodril, Nafoxal, Praxilene, Sodipryl Retard, Stimlor, and Vascuprax, among others.

=== Availability ===
Naftidrofuryl is marketed and used widely throughout the world.

== See also ==
- Serotonin 5-HT_{2A} receptor antagonist
- Irindalone
- Ketanserin
- Sarpogrelate
