= Xylamidine =

Chemical compound

Clinical data
- Drug class: Peripherally selective serotonin receptor antagonist; Serotonin 5-HT_{2A} receptor antagonist
- ATC code: None

Identifiers
- IUPAC name: N'-[2-(3-methoxyphenoxy)propyl]-2-(3-methylphenyl)ethanimidamide
- CAS Number: 6443-50-1
- PubChem CID: 22951
- ChemSpider: 21486
- UNII: NY0PC84NZK
- CompTox Dashboard (EPA): DTXSID90863843

Chemical and physical data
- Formula: C_{19}H_{24}N_{2}O_{2}
- Molar mass: 312.413 g·mol^{−1}
- 3D model (JSmol): Interactive image
- SMILES: CC1=CC(=CC=C1)CC(=NCC(C)OC2=CC=CC(=C2)OC)N
- InChI: InChI=1S/C19H24N2O2/c1-14-6-4-7-16(10-14)11-19(20)21-13-15(2)23-18-9-5-8-17(12-18)22-3/h4-10,12,15H,11,13H2,1-3H3,(H2,20,21); Key:JRYTUFKIORWTNI-UHFFFAOYSA-N

Xylamidine is a drug which acts as an antagonist of the serotonin 5-HT_{2A} and 5-HT_{2C} receptors, and to a lesser extent of the serotonin 5-HT_{1A} receptor. The drug does not cross the blood–brain barrier and hence is peripherally selective, which makes it useful for blocking peripheral serotonergic responses like cardiovascular and gastrointestinal effects, without producing the central effects of 5-HT_{2A} receptor blockade such as sedation, or interfering with the central actions of 5-HT_{2A} receptor agonists.

Xylamidine and analogues were patented for use in combination with serotonin 5-HT_{2A} receptor agonists like serotonergic psychedelics in 2023.

== Chemistry ==
=== Synthesis ===
Xylamidine is an amidine. It is prepared by alkylation of 3-methoxyphenol (m-methoxyphenol) with α-chloropropionitrile, potassium iodide, and potassium carbonate in butanone to give #, which is in turn reduced with lithium aluminium hydride to give the primary amine #. When # is treated with m-tolylacetonitrile in the presence of anhydrous hydrochloric acid, the synthesis is completed. Alternately, one can react primary amine # with m-tolylacetamidine under acid catalysis to produce xylamidine.

== See also ==
- Serotonin 5-HT_{2A} receptor antagonist
- BW-501C67
- Irindalone
- Sarpogrelate
- AL-34662
- VU0530244
