= Remlifanserin =

Clinical data
- Other names: ACP-204; ACP204
- Routes of administration: Oral
- Drug class: Serotonin 5-HT_{2A} receptor inverse agonist

Pharmacokinetic data
- Onset of action: 4–6 hours (6 hours fasted, 9 hours fed) (T_{max})
- Elimination half-life: 17.5–19.8 hours

Identifiers
- IUPAC name: 3-[(4-cyclopropyloxyphenyl)methyl]-1-[(2,4-difluorophenyl)methyl]-1-(1-methylpiperidin-4-yl)urea
- CAS Number: 2289704-13-6
- PubChem CID: 137520242
- UNII: H4L2AF2XB7
- KEGG: D13275

Chemical and physical data
- Formula: C_{24}H_{29}F_{2}N_{3}O_{2}
- Molar mass: 429.512 g·mol^{−1}
- 3D model (JSmol): Interactive image
- SMILES: CN1CCC(CC1)N(CC2=C(C=C(C=C2)F)F)C(=O)NCC3=CC=C(C=C3)OC4CC4
- InChI: InChI=1S/C24H29F2N3O2/c1-28-12-10-20(11-13-28)29(16-18-4-5-19(25)14-23(18)26)24(30)27-15-17-2-6-21(7-3-17)31-22-8-9-22/h2-7,14,20,22H,8-13,15-16H2,1H3,(H,27,30); Key:UYRCLXJMWZFKDG-UHFFFAOYSA-N

Remlifanserin (INN; developmental code name ACP-204) is a selective serotonin 5-HT_{2A} receptor inverse agonist which is under development for the treatment of Alzheimer's disease psychosis. It is taken by mouth.

The drug is an improved follow-up compound to the earlier drug pimavanserin (Nuplaizid; ACP-103). It is more potent and selective than pimavanserin as a serotonin 5-HT_{2A} receptor inverse agonist. Remlifanserin shows 32- to 123-fold selectivity for antagonism and inverse agonism of the serotonin 5-HT_{2A} receptor over the serotonin 5-HT_{2C} receptor depending on the bioassay. For comparison, pimavanserin's selectivity was 8- to 37-fold depending on the assay. Remlifanserin shows very low affinity for the serotonin 5-HT_{2B} receptor compared to the serotonin 5-HT_{2A} and 5-HT_{2C} receptors. It is expected to have less hERG inhibition and QT prolongation than pimavanserin. The drug blocks the head-twitch response induced by the serotonergic psychedelic DOI and the hyperlocomotion induced by the NMDA receptor antagonist dizocilpine (MK-801) in rodents. It has a several-fold shorter half-life than pimavanserin (17.5–19.8 hours vs. 57 hours, respectively).

Remlifanserin is under development by Acadia Pharmaceuticals. As of January 2025, it is in phase 3 clinical trials. Some of its clinicaltrials.gov identifier(s) (nct number) are NCT06159673, NCT07029581, NCT06194799, NCT07095465.

== See also ==
- Serotonin 5-HT_{2A} receptor antagonist
- List of investigational antipsychotics
- List of investigational Parkinson's disease drugs
