= Psychedelic microdosing =

Drug experimentation technique

Psychedelic microdosing is a form of drug microdosing in which sub-hallucinogenic doses of serotonergic psychedelics like LSD and psilocybin are taken for claimed cognitive and emotional benefits.

== Uses, research, and effects ==
A variety of perceived benefits of psychedelic microdosing have been anecdotally claimed, such as beneficial effects on mood or well-being, anxiety, cognitive function, creativity, and productivity. In addition, people informally use microdosing to treat psychiatric conditions and it is being formally clinically studied for such purposes. Examples include for depression, anxiety, obsessive–compulsive disorder (OCD), post-traumatic stress disorder (PTSD), substance misuse, and schizophrenia, among others. There is very little scientific research on microdosing or its effects as of 2024 however and the claimed beneficial effects of microdosing have largely not been scientifically validated.

LSD microdosing three times per week was found in a preliminary 2024 randomized controlled trial to increase sleep duration by 24 minutes on average one day after the microdose (but not the same night of the dose). This included an increase in duration of REM sleep. In January 2026, the results of a phase 2b placebo-controlled clinical trial of LSD microdosing for major depressive disorder were disclosed. This study has been said to be the largest and most rigorous trial of psychedelic microdosing to date. It found that LSD microdosing was not effective and was actually outperformed by the placebo, a caffeine pill, in terms of depression improvement.

Psychedelics and microdosing are being͏͏ investigated͏͏ for potential͏͏ treatment of neurodegenerative disorders like͏͏ Alzheimer's disease.͏͏ They are also being studied for treatment of depression in people with Alzheimer's disease. Certain psychedelics, like DOI and psilocybin, acting as serotonin 5-HT_{2A} receptor agonists, have been found to have potent anti-inflammatory effects at doses well below those that produce hallucinogenic effects in preclinical research and are being clinically investigated for the potential treatment of inflammatory conditions such as neuroinflammation. The anti-inflammatory effects of psychedelics may be involved in the possible benefits of microdosing. LSD microdosing is being clinically studied in the treatment of Alzheimer's disease for its anti-inflammatory effects.

The benefits of microdosing may in part or full be a placebo mediated by positive expectancy effects. In people with major depressive disorder, placebos are known to produce substantial reductions in depressive symptoms all on their own and conventional antidepressants barely outperform placebos in clinical trials. Some researchers have proposed that psychedelics, in general, may be active "super placebos" due to their powerful hallucinogenic effects and cultural associations.

Tolerance and tachyphylaxis are known to rapidly develop to the hallucinogenic effects and to other effects of serotonergic psychedelics in both animals and humans. This is thought to be mediated by rapid serotonin 5-HT_{2A} receptor downregulation that is very slow to recover. Tolerance and loss of effect could serve to limit the potential beneficial effects of psychedelic microdosing and this is a phenomenon that has been observed in existing clinical studies. More research is needed to further assess this issue.

== Dosage and administration ==
LSD and psilocybin, the latter often in the form of psilocybin-containing mushrooms, are the most commonly used psychedelics in microdosing. A microdose is considered to be between approximately one-twentieth to one-tenth of a typical recreational dose. Microdoses of psychedelics are 5 to 20 μg for LSD, 1 to 5 mg for psilocybin, 0.1 to 0.5 g of psilocybin-containing mushrooms, and <75 mg for mescaline. These psychedelics have perceptible psychedelic effects at minimum doses of 10 to 20 μg for LSD, 3 to 5 mg psilocybin, 0.5 g psilocybin-containing mushrooms, and 100 mg mescaline.

== Side effects ==
Side effects of psychedelic microdosing with LSD or psilocybin may include increased blood pressure, anxiety, cognitive impairment, and physiological discomfort. The side effects of microdosing are generally infrequent, mild, dose-dependent, and short-lasting.

=== Cardiovascular toxicity ===
Psychedelics, including LSD, psilocybin, dimethyltryptamine (DMT), mescaline, and many others, are potent serotonin 5-HT_{2B} receptor agonists in addition to the serotonin 5-HT_{2A} receptor agonism that mediates their hallucinogenic effects. Long-term use of potent serotonin 5-HT_{2B} receptor agonists like fenfluramine, methysergide, ergotamine, cabergoline, pergolide, and MDMA is known to produce serious organ toxicity including cardiac fibrosis, valvulopathy, and pulmonary hypertension. Conversely, certain other serotonin 5-HT_{2B} receptor agonists, such as guanfacine, ropinirole, and oxymetazoline, have not been associated with such toxicities, perhaps due to factors like biased agonism and/or inadequate potency or exposure. Due to potent serotonin 5-HT_{2B} receptor agonism, long-term use of psychedelics, for instance microdosing, might produce heart and other organ toxicity. Conversely, infrequent macrodoses of psychedelics are thought to be safe.

The risk of cardiac valvulopathy and toxicity with long-term use of psychedelics is, aside from the case of MDMA, theoretical and has largely not been assessed or demonstrated in animals or humans. It is notable in this regard that findings on the serotonin 5-HT_{2B} receptor agonism of psychedelics including LSD, psilocybin, mescaline, and dimethyltryptamine (DMT) are conflicting, with some studies finding them to be potent serotonin 5-HT_{2B} receptor agonists and others finding them to be very weak or negligible serotonin 5-HT_{2B} receptor agonists, depending on the study and assay. The cardiac toxicity of serotonin 5-HT_{2B} receptor activation has been specifically linked to extracellular regulating kinase 2 (ERK2) signaling and not necessarily to other downstream signaling pathways. LSD has been found to have low activity on a valvulopathogenic ERK2 serotonin 5-HT_{2B} receptor agonism readout relative to known or suspected valvopathogens like norfenfluramine, pergolide, methylergonovine (methylergometrine), ergonovine (ergometrine), cabergoline, dihydroergotamine, and ergotamine. This was in terms of both activational potency (EC_{50} = 110 nM vs. 1.0–20 nM, respectively) and efficacy (E_{max} = 39% vs. 53–79%, respectively). Conversely, other psychedelics like psilocin, DMT, and mescaline have not been assessed in terms of this assay as of 2022. However, other research suggests that the toxicity may not be specifically or exclusively dependent on ERK2 signaling. More research is needed to determine whether long-term frequent use of psychedelics, including microdosing, may cause cardiac valvulopathy and other related toxicities.

Selective serotonin 5-HT_{2A} receptor agonists that do not activate the serotonin 5-HT_{2B} receptor or other serotonin receptors, such as 25CN-NBOH, DMBMPP, and LPH-5, have been developed and are being studied. Selective serotonin 5-HT_{2A} receptor agonists are expected to avoid the cardiac risks of serotonin 5-HT_{2B} receptor activation. In addition, selective serotonin 5-HT_{2B} receptor antagonists, including peripherally selective drugs like VU0530244, are being investigated and developed for potential medical use. Selective serotonin 5-HT_{2B} receptor antagonism has been found to fully prevent the cardiotoxicity of dexnorfenfluramine in animal studies, but clinical studies are needed.

=== Neurological toxicity ===
LSD, one of the most commonly used psychedelics in microdosing, is unique among psychedelics in its pharmacology and effects in that it appears to have two temporally and qualitatively distinct phases of psychoactive effects. These include an initial psychedelic-like phase associated with serotonin 5-HT_{2A} receptor agonism and a subsequent paranoia- and psychosis-like phase associated with dopamine D_{2}-like receptor agonism. Relatedly, unlike other psychedelics, chronic administration of low and microdose-like doses of LSD in rodents has been found to produce long-lasting neuroadaptations resulting in adverse psychosis-like behavioral changes that persist long after LSD discontinuation. These symptoms included psychosis-like hyperlocomotion, decreased social interaction, hyperreactivity, marked aggression, and anhedonia. Some of the symptoms could be transiently reversed by dopamine D_{2} receptor antagonists like haloperidol and olanzapine but not by the serotonin 5-HT_{2A} receptor antagonist volinanserin, suggesting association with dopamine receptor signaling rather than with the serotonin 5-HT_{2A} receptor. It is unknown whether similar effects may occur in humans. In contrast to chronic administration, single macrodoses of LSD do not produce such changes in rodents.

== Pharmacology ==
The clinical pharmacodynamics and pharmacokinetics of microdosed LSD have been studied.

== History ==
According to psychedelic researcher Matthew J. Baggott in 2023, the first documented instance of psychedelic microdosing may be the Grateful Dead's use of low and sub-psychedelic doses of DOM as a mild stimulant in the late 1960s. However, studies of the effects of very low doses of psychedelics date back as early as 1955. Albert Hofmann first mentioned psychedelic microdosing and possible therapeutic benefits of the intervention like euphoria, antidepressant, and mild stimulant effects in a 1976 High Times interview. He is said to have taken microdoses of LSD for most of the later years of his life. James Fadiman was responsible for introducing the modern paradigm and phenomenon of psychedelic microdosing, which had previously been largely unknown, with his 2011 book The Psychedelic Explorer's Guide. Ayelet Waldman additionally helped to popularize microdosing with her 2017 book A Really Good Day: How Microdosing Made a Mega Difference in My Mood, My Marriage, and My Life. There has been a dramatic increase in interest in psychedelic microdosing as well as scientific research into the practice since 2018.

== Society and culture ==
Psychedelic microdosing is frequently discussed on online forums such as the r/microdosing community on Reddit.

== See also ==
- Psychedelic drug § Psychedelic afterglows
- Nootropic
- Psychedelic therapy
- List of investigational hallucinogens and entactogens
