= Eplivanserin =

Chemical compound

Clinical data
- Other names: SR-46349; SR46349; SR-46349B; SR46349B; SR-46615; SR46615; SR-46615A; SR46615A; Ciltyri; Sliwens
- Routes of administration: Oral
- Drug class: Serotonin 5-HT_{2A} receptor antagonist
- ATC code: None

Pharmacokinetic data
- Onset of action: T_{max}: 2–6 hours
- Elimination half-life: 50 hours

Identifiers
- IUPAC name: 4-[(E,3Z)-3-[2-(dimethylamino)ethoxyimino]-3-(2-fluorophenyl)prop-1-enyl]phenol
- CAS Number: 130579-75-8 130580-02-8 (fumarate)
- PubChem CID: 135456190
- DrugBank: DB12177
- ChemSpider: 13267837
- UNII: 3CO94WO6DJ
- KEGG: D10006
- ChEMBL: ChEMBL257704
- CompTox Dashboard (EPA): DTXSID601028413
- ECHA InfoCard: 100.189.857

Chemical and physical data
- Formula: C_{19}H_{21}FN_{2}O_{2}
- Molar mass: 328.387 g·mol^{−1}
- 3D model (JSmol): Interactive image
- SMILES: CN(C)CCO/N=C(/C=C/C1=CC=C(C=C1)O)\C2=CC=CC=C2F
- InChI: InChI=1S/C19H21FN2O2/c1-22(2)13-14-24-21-19(17-5-3-4-6-18(17)20)12-9-15-7-10-16(23)11-8-15/h3-12,23H,13-14H2,1-2H3/b12-9+,21-19-; Key:VAIOZOCLKVMIMN-PRJWTAEASA-N

Eplivanserin, also known by its former developmental code names SR-46349 and SR-46615 and by its former tentative brand names Ciltyri and Sliwens, is a serotonin 5-HT_{2A} receptor antagonist which was under development by Sanofi Aventis for the treatment of a variety of medical conditions but was never marketed. It is taken orally.

== Pharmacology ==
=== Pharmacodynamics ===
Eplivanserin is an inverse agonist on the serotonin receptor subtype 5-HT_{2A}. In contrast to older sedating drugs acting on 5-HT_{2A} receptors (e.g., mirtazapine, clozapine, risperidone), eplivanserin has practically no affinity to dopamine, histamine and adrenergic receptors.

Eplivanserin blocks the head-twitch response produced by the serotonin precursor 5-hydroxytryptophan (5-HTP), by serotonergic psychedelics (serotonin 5-HT_{2A} receptor agonists) like DOI, and by serotonin 5-HT_{1A} receptor antagonists like WAY-100635 and (S)-UH-301.

The drug has been shown to upregulate serotonin 5-HT_{2A} receptor expression, unlike many known serotonin 5-HT_{2A} receptor antagonists, which paradoxically induce receptor downregulation. Relatedly, although eplivanserin given acutely can block the head-twitch response induced by various serotonergic drugs, it can also enhance the head-twitch response induced by 5-HTP and psychedelics like DOI when given on a sub-acute basis (given continuously and then withdrawn).

=== Pharmacokinetics ===
Eplivanserin is well-absorbed, with an absorption of more than 70%. The time to peak levels of eplivanserin is 2 to 6 hours. Its elimination half-life is relatively long, with an average value of 50 hours.

== Chemistry ==
=== Synthesis ===
Patent: Chinese

The condensation between 2'-Fluoroacetophenone [445-27-2] (5) & 4-hydroxybenzaldehyde [123-08-0] (6) give a chalcone intermediate (also an enone), i.e. CID:53982926 (7).

(2-chloroethyl)dimethylamine (CDMA) & acetone oxime are reacted together to give dimethylaminoacetoxime (DMA acetoxime), CID:16641114 (3).

Convergent synthesis gives the product as a mixture of isomers.

== History ==
Sanofi Aventis announced in December 2009 that it was withdrawing its application for approval of eplivanserin from both the U.S. Food and Drug Administration and the European Medicines Agency.

== Research ==
Eplivanserin was under development for the treatment of anxiety disorders, insomnia, major depressive disorder, myocardial infarction (heart attack), and sleep apnea, but development for all indications was discontinued. It reached preregistration for insomnia, but the New Drug Application (NDA) was declined by the Food and Drug Administration (FDA), which requested additional evidence regarding benefit–risk ratio. Eplivanserin completed a clinical development program for insomnia that included two phase 3 clinical trials and almost 3,000 patients. In a placebo controlled phase 2 trial with 351 subjects, eplivanserin reduced the sleep latency by 39 minutes (versus 26 minutes under placebo).

== See also ==
- Serotonin 5-HT_{2A} receptor antagonist
- List of investigational insomnia drugs
- Eplivanserin/volinanserin
- Pimavanserin
- Volinanserin
