= C24H28N4O4 =

The molecular formula C_{24}H_{28}N_{4}O_{4} (molar mass: 436.512 g/mol) may refer to:

- Temanogrel (APD791)
- Ergosecaline
