= Eplivanserin/volinanserin =

- Eplivanserin (top) and volinanserin (bottom)

Combination of
- Eplivanserin: Serotonin 5-HT_{2A} receptor antagonist
- Volinanserin: Serotonin 5-HT_{2A} receptor antagonist

Clinical data
- Other names: Volinanserin/eplivanserin
- Drug class: Serotonin 5-HT_{2A} receptor antagonist

Pharmacokinetic data
- Onset of action: Volinanserin: 1–2.5 hours (T_{max}); Eplivanserin: 2–6 hours (T_{max})
- Elimination half-life: Volinanserin: 6.6 hours Eplivanserin: 50 hours

Eplivanserin/volinanserin is a combination of eplivanserin and volinanserin, both of which are selective serotonin 5-HT_{2A} receptor antagonists, which is under development for the treatment of psychiatric and neurological disorders. One of its indications is to block the hallucinogenic effects of serotonergic psychedelics, for instance to abort psychedelic experiences early or to allow for take-home medications without hallucinations but with potentially retained therapeutic benefits. Its route of administration is unspecified. The elimination half-life of volinanserin is 6.6 hours and of eplivanserin is 50 hours. As of January 2024, eplivanserin/volinanserin has entered clinical trials for neurological and psychiatric disorders, but its exact clinical phase is unknown. It is being developed by Terran Biosciences.

== See also ==
- Serotonin 5-HT_{2A} receptor antagonist
- List of investigational hallucinogens and entactogens
- Trip killer and ketanserin
