= BW-501C67 =

Peripheral serotonin antagonist

Clinical data
- Other names: BW-501; BW-501C; α-Anilino-N-2-(3-chlorophenoxy)-propylacetamidine
- Drug class: Peripherally selective serotonin receptor antagonist; Serotonin 5-HT_{2A} receptor antagonist

Identifiers
- IUPAC name: 2-anilino-N'-[3-(2-chlorophenoxy)propyl]ethanimidamide
- CAS Number: 793615-47-1 68518-39-8 (hydrochloride)
- PubChem CID: 172196
- ChemSpider: 150502

Chemical and physical data
- Formula: C_{17}H_{20}ClN_{3}O
- Molar mass: 317.82 g·mol^{−1}
- 3D model (JSmol): Interactive image
- SMILES: C1=CC=C(C=C1)NCC(=NCCCOC2=CC=CC=C2Cl)N
- InChI: InChI=1S/C17H20ClN3O/c18-15-9-4-5-10-16(15)22-12-6-11-20-17(19)13-21-14-7-2-1-3-8-14/h1-5,7-10,21H,6,11-13H2,(H2,19,20); Key:IKCBXYTYVXLXIR-UHFFFAOYSA-N

BW-501C67 is a peripherally selective serotonin 5-HT_{2A} and 5-HT_{2C} receptor antagonist which is used in scientific research. It shows selectivity for the serotonin 5-HT_{2} receptors over the α_{1}-adrenergic receptor.

The drug antagonizes peripheral but not central effects of serotonin receptor agonists like serotonin. As examples, it has been found to antagonize the sympathomimetic effects of serotonin in animals, including vasoconstriction and pressor effects, but does not block centrally mediated effects like increased corticosterone secretion or myoclonus.

BW-501C67 and analogues were patented for use in combination with serotonin 5-HT_{2A} receptor agonists like serotonergic psychedelics in 2023.

== See also ==
- Serotonin 5-HT_{2A} receptor antagonist
- Irindalone
- Sarpogrelate
- Xylamidine
- AL-34662
- VU0530244
