= NH 130 =

NH 130 may refer to:

- National Highway 130 (India)
- New Hampshire Route 130, United States
- NH130, a psychiatric drug
