= MT-1207 =

Clinical data
- Other names: MT1207; II-13
- Drug class: Serotonin 5-HT_{2A} receptor antagonist; α_{1}-Adrenergic receptor antagonist; Calcium channel blocker

Pharmacokinetic data
- Onset of action: 0.5–1.25 hours (T_{max})
- Elimination half-life: 4–7 hours

Identifiers
- IUPAC name: 3-[4-[4-(benzotriazol-1-yl)butyl]piperazin-1-yl]-1,2-benzothiazole
- CAS Number: 1610793-69-5
- PubChem CID: 76283388
- ChemSpider: 129431460
- UNII: YHJ29MGZ6G
- ChEMBL: ChEMBL6070424

Chemical and physical data
- Formula: C_{21}H_{24}N_{6}S
- Molar mass: 392.53 g·mol^{−1}
- 3D model (JSmol): Interactive image
- SMILES: C1CN(CCN1CCCCN2C3=CC=CC=C3N=N2)C4=NSC5=CC=CC=C54
- InChI: InChI=1S/C21H24N6S/c1-4-10-20-17(7-1)21(23-28-20)26-15-13-25(14-16-26)11-5-6-12-27-19-9-3-2-8-18(19)22-24-27/h1-4,7-10H,5-6,11-16H2; Key:GOALZWVIJQGFQJ-UHFFFAOYSA-N

MT-1207 is a combined serotonin 5-HT_{2A} receptor antagonist, α_{1}-adrenergic receptor antagonist, and calcium channel blocker which is under development for the treatment of hypertension (high blood pressure). It is taken orally. The drug's time to peak levels is 0.5 to 1.25 hours and its elimination half-life is 4 to 7 hours. MT-1207 is under development in China. As of 2025, MT-1207 has reached phase 2 clinical trials.
