= C24H26FN3O2 =

The molecular formula C_{24}H_{26}FN_{3}O_{2} (molar mass: 407.489 g/mol) may refer to:

- S-14506
- Metrenperone
