= C22H25N3O3 =

The molecular formula C_{22}H_{25}N_{3}O_{3} may refer to:

- LY-2624803,
- Niravoline, a chemical compound with diuretic and aquaretic effects
- Spiroxatrine, a drug which acts as a selective antagonist at both the 5-HT_{1A} receptor and the α2C adrenergic receptor
