= Butanserin =

Clinical data
- Other names: R-53393; R53393; R-53,393
- Drug class: Serotonin 5-HT_{2A} receptor antagonist; α_{1}-Adrenergic receptor antagonist; Antihypertensive agent
- ATC code: None

Identifiers
- IUPAC name: 3-[4-[4-(4-fluorobenzoyl)piperidin-1-yl]butyl]-1H-quinazoline-2,4-dione
- CAS Number: 87051-46-5
- PubChem CID: 65652
- DrugBank: DB19943
- ChemSpider: 59089
- UNII: 4I933V848G
- ChEMBL: ChEMBL1742433
- CompTox Dashboard (EPA): DTXSID40236109

Chemical and physical data
- Formula: C_{24}H_{26}FN_{3}O_{3}
- Molar mass: 423.488 g·mol^{−1}
- 3D model (JSmol): Interactive image
- SMILES: C1CN(CCC1C(=O)C2=CC=C(C=C2)F)CCCCN3C(=O)C4=CC=CC=C4NC3=O
- InChI: InChI=1S/C24H26FN3O3/c25-19-9-7-17(8-10-19)22(29)18-11-15-27(16-12-18)13-3-4-14-28-23(30)20-5-1-2-6-21(20)26-24(28)31/h1-2,5-10,18H,3-4,11-16H2,(H,26,31); Key:MLDQSYUQSLUEPG-UHFFFAOYSA-N

Butanserin (INN; developmental code name R-53393) is a serotonin 5-HT_{2} receptor antagonist and α_{1}-adrenergic receptor antagonist which was studied as an antihypertensive agent but was never marketed. It was first described in the scientific literature by 1984.

== See also ==
- Serotonin 5-HT_{2A} receptor antagonist
- α_{1}-Adrenergic receptor antagonist
