= Seganserin =

Clinical data
- Other names: R-56413; R56413
- Drug class: Serotonin 5-HT_{2} receptor antagonist; Serotonin 5-HT_{2A} receptor antagonist
- ATC code: None

Pharmacokinetic data
- Onset of action: T_{max}: 1 hour
- Elimination half-life: 26 hours

Identifiers
- IUPAC name: 3-[2-[4-[bis(4-fluorophenyl)methylidene]piperidin-1-yl]ethyl]-2-methylpyrido[1,2-a]pyrimidin-4-one
- CAS Number: 87729-89-3
- PubChem CID: 71767
- DrugBank: DB19608
- ChemSpider: 64806
- UNII: 197HL4EZCC
- ChEMBL: ChEMBL1742436
- CompTox Dashboard (EPA): DTXSID50236594

Chemical and physical data
- Formula: C_{29}H_{27}F_{2}N_{3}O
- Molar mass: 471.552 g·mol^{−1}
- 3D model (JSmol): Interactive image
- SMILES: CC1=C(C(=O)N2C=CC=CC2=N1)CCN3CCC(=C(C4=CC=C(C=C4)F)C5=CC=C(C=C5)F)CC3
- InChI: InChI=1S/C29H27F2N3O/c1-20-26(29(35)34-16-3-2-4-27(34)32-20)15-19-33-17-13-23(14-18-33)28(21-5-9-24(30)10-6-21)22-7-11-25(31)12-8-22/h2-12,16H,13-15,17-19H2,1H3; Key:ZGUPMFYFHHSNFK-UHFFFAOYSA-N

Seganserin (INN, BAN; developmental code name R-56413) is a selective serotonin 5-HT_{2} receptor antagonist which was studied for the treatment of insomnia and anxiety but was never marketed. It acts as a dual serotonin 5-HT_{2A} and 5-HT_{2C} receptor antagonist. The drug blocks the head-twitch response induced by serotonin precursor 5-hydroxytryptophan (5-HTP) and the psychedelic drug mescaline in rodents. It has been found to enhance slow wave sleep (SWS) in clinical studies. The drug's time to peak levels is 1 hour and its elimination half-life is 26 hours. Seganserin reached phase 2 clinical trials prior to the discontinuation of its development. It was first described in the scientific literature by 1985.

== See also ==
- Serotonin 5-HT_{2A} receptor antagonist
- List of investigational insomnia drugs
