= Pimavanserin =

Atypical antipsychotic medication

Clinical data
- Trade names: Nuplazid
- Other names: ACP-103; BVF-036; BVF-048
- License data: US DailyMed: Pimavanserin
- Routes of administration: Oral
- Drug class: Serotonin 5-HT_{2A} receptor antagonist; Antipsychotic
- ATC code: N05AX17 (WHO)

Legal status
- Legal status: US: ℞-only

Pharmacokinetic data
- Protein binding: 94–97%
- Metabolism: Hepatic (CYP3A4, CYP3A5, CYP2J2)
- Metabolites: N-Desmethyl-pimavanserin
- Onset of action: T_{max}: 6 hours
- Elimination half-life: Pimavanserin: 54–57 h N-Desmethyl-pimavanserin (active): 200 h

Identifiers
- IUPAC name: N-(4-fluorophenylmethyl)-N-(1-methylpiperidin-4-yl)-N'-(4-(2-methylpropyloxy)phenylmethyl)carbamide
- CAS Number: 706779-91-1 706782-28-7 (tartrate)
- PubChem CID: 10071196
- DrugBank: DB05316
- ChemSpider: 8246736
- UNII: JZ963P0DIK
- KEGG: D08969
- ChEBI: CHEBI:133017
- ChEMBL: ChEMBL2111101
- CompTox Dashboard (EPA): DTXSID90990906

Chemical and physical data
- Formula: C_{25}H_{34}FN_{3}O_{2}
- Molar mass: 427.564 g·mol^{−1}
- 3D model (JSmol): Interactive image
- SMILES: CC(C)COc3ccc(cc3)CNC(=O)N(C(CC2)CCN2C)Cc(cc1)ccc1F
- InChI: InChI=1S/C25H34FN3O2/c1-19(2)18-31-24-10-6-20(7-11-24)16-27-25(30)29(23-12-14-28(3)15-13-23)17-21-4-8-22(26)9-5-21/h4-11,19,23H,12-18H2,1-3H3,(H,27,30); Key:RKEWSXXUOLRFBX-UHFFFAOYSA-N

Pimavanserin, sold under the brand name Nuplazid, is an atypical antipsychotic which is approved for the treatment of Parkinson's disease psychosis. It is taken by mouth.

Side effects of pimavanserin include peripheral edema and confusion. Unlike other antipsychotics, pimavanserin is not a dopamine receptor antagonist, but rather is a selective antagonist or inverse agonist of the serotonin 5-HT_{2A} receptor and to a lesser extent of the serotonin 5-HT_{2C} receptor.

Pimavanserin was first approved for medical use in 2016. It was approved as a generic medication in 2024.

== Medical uses ==
Pimavanserin is used in the treatment of Parkinson's disease psychosis.

=== Available forms ===
Pimavanserin is available in the form of 10 mg oral tablets and 34 mg oral capsules.

== Side effects ==
Side effects of pimavanserin include peripheral edema and confusion, among others.

== Pharmacology ==
=== Pharmacodynamics ===
Activities of pimavanserin
Target	Affinity (K_{i}, nM)
5-HT_{1A}	ND
5-HT_{2A}	0.087–0.5 (K_{i}); 1.9–50 (IC_{50})
5-HT_{2B}	436 (K_{i})
5-HT_{2C}	0.44–10 (K_{i}); 91 (IC_{50})
D_{1}–D_{5}	300+
α_{1}–β_{3}	300+
H_{1}–H_{4}	300+
M_{1}–M_{5}	300+
σ_{1}	120
Notes: The smaller the value, the more avidly the drug binds to the site. All proteins are human unless otherwise specified. Refs:

Pimavanserin acts as a selective inverse agonist or antagonist of the serotonin 5-HT_{2A} receptor. It is also an antagonist or inverse agonist of the serotonin 5-HT_{2C} receptor to a lesser extent.

The drug has an affinity (K_{i}) of 0.087 to 0.5 nM for the serotonin 5-HT_{2A} receptor and 0.44 to 10 nM at the serotonin 5-HT_{2C} receptor, whereas its functional inhibition (IC_{50}) values have been reported to be 1.9 nM at the serotonin 5-HT_{2A} receptor and 91 nM at the serotonin 5-HT_{2C} receptor. Hence, it shows 3- to 50-fold greater affinity for the serotonin 5-HT_{2A} receptor over the serotonin 5-HT_{2C} receptor depending on the assay and 49-fold selectivity in terms of functional inhibition of the serotonin 5-HT_{2A} receptor compared to the serotonin 5-HT_{2C} receptor.

Pimavanserin shows low binding to σ_{1} receptors (K_{i} = 120 nM) and has no appreciable affinity (K_{i} > 300 nM) to serotonin 5-HT_{2B}, dopamine (including D_{2}), muscarinic acetylcholine, histamine, or adrenergic receptors, or to calcium channels.

=== Pharmacokinetics ===
Pimavanserin is slowly absorbed and has a time to peak levels of 6 hours. The elimination half-life of pimavanserin is 54 to 57 hours. The half-life of its active metabolite N-desmethylpimavanserin is 200 hours.

== History ==
=== Development ===
Pimavanserin was developed by Acadia Pharmaceuticals.

Pimavanserin is expected to improve the effectiveness and side effect profile of antipsychotics. The results of a clinical trial examining the efficacy, tolerability and safety of adjunctive pimavanserin to risperidone and haloperidol were published in November 2012, and the results showed that pimavanserin potentiated the antipsychotic effects of subtherapeutic doses of risperidone and improved the tolerability of haloperidol treatment by reducing the incidence of extrapyramidal symptoms.

The drug met expectations for a Phase III clinical trial for the treatment of Parkinson's disease psychosis, and has completed Phase II trials for adjunctive treatment of schizophrenia alongside an antipsychotic medication.

In September 2014, the United States Food and Drug Administration (FDA) granted breakthrough therapy status to Acadia's New Drug Application for pimavanserin.

==== FDA Approval ====
In April 2016, Nuplazid (pimavanserin) was approved by the FDA for the treatment of hallucinations and delusions associated with Parkinson's disease psychosis. The non-binding advisory panel recommendation of 12-to-2 in support of approval that preceded the FDA approval action noted that the drug met an important need, despite its only providing modest benefits and posing serious safety issues.

In June 2018, the FDA approved new dosages of pimavanserin to treat hallucinations and delusions associated with Parkinson's disease psychosis. A 34 mg capsule and 10 mg tablet formulation were approved. Previously, people were required to take two 17 mg tablets to achieve the recommended 34 mg dose per day. The 10 mg dose is indicated for people also taking CYP3A4 inhibitors (e.g., ketoconazole).

== HARMONY-Trial ==
In a Phase III, double-blind, randomized, placebo-controlled trial (ClinicalTrials.gov number NTC03325556) pimavanserin was given to people with dementia-related psychosis. The dementia was caused by Alzheimer's disease, dementia with lewy bodies, frontotemporal dementia, Parkinson's disease dementia, or vascular dementia. The trial was stopped early due to lack of efficacy. People treated with pimavanserin had a relapse in 13%, and those without 28%. Longer and larger trials are suggested.

=== Controversy ===
In April 2018, CNN reported that some in the FDA were concerned that pimavanserin (Nuplazid) was "risky" when it was approved and noted there have been a substantial number of deaths reported by those using the drug. The story further noted that the drug was approved based on a "six-week study of about 200 patients". The FDA began post-market monitoring of the drug to assess the validity of these claims. In September 2018, the FDA stated their review "did not identify any new or unexpected safety findings with Nuplazid, or findings that are inconsistent with the established safety profile currently described in the drug label".

== Research ==
Pimavanserin was studied as a therapeutic agent in Phase III clinical trials for major depressive disorder and schizophrenia and Phase II trials for agitation. It was also under development for the treatment of insomnia, drug-induced akathisia, and drug-induced dyskinesia, but development for these indications was discontinued.

In March 2024, Acadia Pharmaceuticals announced its decision to stop any further clinical trials of pimavanserin after the drug did not improve negative symptoms of schizophrenia better than placebo.

As of November 2024, a phase 2 clinical trial is underway assessing the ability of pimavanserin to block the effects of the serotonergic psychedelic psilocybin.

== See also ==
- Serotonin 5-HT_{2A} receptor antagonist
- List of investigational antipsychotics
