= Selonabant =

Clinical data
- Other names: ANEB-001; ANEB001; V-24343; V24343
- Drug class: Cannabinoid receptor antagonist; Cannabinoid CB_{1} receptor antagonist; Cannabinoid antidote

Identifiers
- IUPAC name: N-tert-butyl-3-[(R)-(4-chlorophenyl)-[2-(trifluoromethyl)phenyl]methoxy]azetidine-1-carboxamide
- CAS Number: 791848-71-0
- PubChem CID: 68902536
- DrugBank: DB18908
- ChemSpider: 128922145
- UNII: 4RNU8C6XXW
- KEGG: D12875
- ChEMBL: ChEMBL5095165

Chemical and physical data
- Formula: C_{22}H_{24}ClF_{3}N_{2}O_{2}
- Molar mass: 440.89 g·mol^{−1}
- 3D model (JSmol): Interactive image
- SMILES: CC(C)(C)NC(=O)N1CC(C1)O[C@H](C2=CC=C(C=C2)Cl)C3=CC=CC=C3C(F)(F)F
- InChI: InChI=1S/C22H24ClF3N2O2/c1-21(2,3)27-20(29)28-12-16(13-28)30-19(14-8-10-15(23)11-9-14)17-6-4-5-7-18(17)22(24,25)26/h4-11,16,19H,12-13H2,1-3H3,(H,27,29)/t19-/m1/s1; Key:BNLYOVHLLDBOFZ-LJQANCHMSA-N

Selonabant (INN, USAN; developmental code names ANEB-001, V-24343) is a cannabinoid CB_{1} receptor antagonist which is under development for the treatment of acute cannabinoid intoxication. It was also previously being developed to treat obesity, but development for this indication was discontinued. The drug is administered by intravenous infusion. It dramatically reduced the subjective effects of Δ^{9}-tetrahydrocannabinol (THC) in a clinical trial. Selonabant is being developed by Vernalis and Anebulo Pharmaceuticals. As of December 2024, it is in phase 2 trials.

== See also ==
- Hallucinogen antidote
