= Iferanserin =

Chemical compound

Clinical data
- Other names: VEN-309; VEN309
- Drug class: Serotonin 5-HT_{2A} receptor antagonist
- ATC code: None

Identifiers
- IUPAC name: (E)-N-[2-[2-[(2S)-1-methylpiperidin-2-yl]ethyl]phenyl]-3-phenylprop-2-enamide
- CAS Number: 58754-46-4
- PubChem CID: 6445539
- ChemSpider: 4949235
- UNII: NWR3BEB8PA
- ChEMBL: ChEMBL2107754
- CompTox Dashboard (EPA): DTXSID101030346

Chemical and physical data
- Formula: C_{23}H_{28}N_{2}O
- Molar mass: 348.490 g·mol^{−1}
- 3D model (JSmol): Interactive image
- SMILES: O=C(\C=C\c1ccccc1)Nc2ccccc2CC[C@H]3N(C)CCCC3
- InChI: InChI=1S/C23H28N2O/c1-25-18-8-7-12-21(25)16-15-20-11-5-6-13-22(20)24-23(26)17-14-19-9-3-2-4-10-19/h2-6,9-11,13-14,17,21H,7-8,12,15-16,18H2,1H3,(H,24,26)/b17-14+/t21-/m0/s1; Key:UXIPFQUBOVWAQW-UEBLJOKOSA-N

Iferanserin (INN; VEN-309) is a drug which acts as a selective 5-HT_{2A} receptor antagonist. It is under development as an intra-rectal formulation for the treatment of hemorrhoid disease, and as of February 2012, is in phase IIb clinical trials.

== See also ==
- Serotonin 5-HT_{2A} receptor antagonist
