= Sarpogrelate =

Chemical compound

Clinical data
- Trade names: Anplag; Sapodifil
- Other names: MCI-9042; LS-187,118; LS-187118; KW-21027
- AHFS/Drugs.com: International Drug Names
- Drug class: Serotonin 5-HT_{2} receptor antagonist; Serotonin 5-HT_{2A} receptor antagonist; Anticoagulant; Platelet aggregation inhibitor
- ATC code: None

Identifiers
- IUPAC name: 4-[2-(dimethylamino)-1-({2-[2-(3-methoxyphenyl)ethyl]phenoxy}methyl)ethoxy]-4-oxobutanoic acid
- CAS Number: 125926-17-2
- PubChem CID: 5160
- IUPHAR/BPS: 210
- ChemSpider: 4976
- UNII: 19P708E787
- ChEMBL: ChEMBL52939
- CompTox Dashboard (EPA): DTXSID7048328

Chemical and physical data
- Formula: C_{24}H_{31}NO_{6}
- Molar mass: 429.513 g·mol^{−1}
- 3D model (JSmol): Interactive image
- SMILES: CN(C)CC(COC1=CC=CC=C1CCC2=CC(=CC=C2)OC)OC(=O)CCC(=O)O
- InChI: InChI=1S/C24H31NO6/c1-25(2)16-21(31-24(28)14-13-23(26)27)17-30-22-10-5-4-8-19(22)12-11-18-7-6-9-20(15-18)29-3/h4-10,15,21H,11-14,16-17H2,1-3H3,(H,26,27); Key:FFYNAVGJSYHHFO-UHFFFAOYSA-N

Sarpogrelate (INN, JAN), sold under the brand names Anplag and Sapodifil, is a serotonin 5-HT_{2} receptor antagonist which is used in the treatment of arterial occlusive disorders such as peripheral artery disease in Japan, South Korea, and China. Development in the United States and the European Union was discontinued and it is not available in these regions.

The drug acts as an antagonist at the serotonin 5-HT_{2A}, 5-HT_{2B}, and 5-HT_{2C} receptors. However, its affinities for the human 5-HT_{2C} and 5-HT_{2B} receptors are about one and two orders of magnitude lower than for the human 5-HT_{2A} receptor, respectively. The drug blocks serotonin-induced platelet aggregation, and has potential applications in the treatment of many diseases including diabetes mellitus, Buerger's disease, Raynaud's disease, coronary artery disease, angina pectoris, and atherosclerosis.

The predicted log P (XLogP3) of sarpogrelate is 1.2. A 2004 review stated that it was unknown whether sarpogrelate crosses the blood–brain barrier. However, other papers have stated that sarpogrelate minimally crosses into the brain and hence is peripherally selective. Accordingly, a rat study found that peak sarpogrelate levels were 50-fold lower in the brain and spinal cord than in the circulation.

== See also ==
- Serotonin 5-HT_{2A} receptor antagonist
- BW-501C67
- Cinanserin
- Irindalone
- Naftidrofuryl
- R-102444
