= Pizotifen =

Drug used to reduce frequency of headaches

Clinical data
- Trade names: Sandomigran, Mosegor, Litec, others
- Other names: Pizotyline; BC-105
- AHFS/Drugs.com: International Drug Names
- Pregnancy category: AU: B1
- Routes of administration: Oral
- ATC code: N02CX01 (WHO)

Legal status
- Legal status: AU: S4 (Prescription only); CA: ℞-only; UK: POM (Prescription only)

Pharmacokinetic data
- Bioavailability: 78%
- Protein binding: >90%
- Metabolism: N-Glucuronidation
- Onset of action: 5 hours (T_{max})
- Elimination half-life: 23 hours
- Excretion: 18% feces, 55% urine (both as metabolites)

Identifiers
- IUPAC name: 4-(1-methyl-4-piperidylidine)-9,10-dihydro -4H-benzo-[4,5]cyclohepta[1,2]-thiophene
- CAS Number: 15574-96-6
- PubChem CID: 27400
- IUPHAR/BPS: 93
- DrugBank: DB06153
- ChemSpider: 25497
- UNII: 0BY8440V3N
- KEGG: D05523
- ChEMBL: ChEMBL294951
- CompTox Dashboard (EPA): DTXSID6023490
- ECHA InfoCard: 100.036.014

Chemical and physical data
- Formula: C_{19}H_{21}NS
- Molar mass: 295.44 g·mol^{−1}
- 3D model (JSmol): Interactive image
- SMILES: s1c3c(cc1)C(\c2c(cccc2)CC3)=C4/CCN(C)CC4
- InChI: InChI=1S/C19H21NS/c1-20-11-8-15(9-12-20)19-16-5-3-2-4-14(16)6-7-18-17(19)10-13-21-18/h2-5,10,13H,6-9,11-12H2,1H3; Key:FIADGNVRKBPQEU-UHFFFAOYSA-N

Pizotifen, also known as pizotyline and sold under the brand names Sandomigran and Mosegor among others, is an antimigraine agent of the tricyclic group which is used primarily as a preventative to reduce the frequency of recurrent migraine headaches.

== Medical uses ==
=== Migraine headaches ===
The main medical use for pizotifen is for the prevention of migraine and cluster headache. Pizotifen is one of a range of medications used for this purpose, other options include propranolol, topiramate, valproic acid, cyproheptadine and amitriptyline. While pizotifen is effective in adults, evidence of efficacy in children is limited, and its use is limited by side effects, principally drowsiness and weight gain, and it is usually not the first choice medicine for preventing migraines, instead being used as an alternative when other drugs have failed to be effective. It is not effective in relieving migraine attacks once in progress.

=== Other uses ===
Pizotifen has also been reported as highly effective in a severe case of erythromelalgia, a rare neurovascular disease that is sometimes refractory to the other drugs named above.

Other applications for which pizotifen may be used include as an antidepressant, or for the treatment of anxiety or social phobia. Animal studies also suggest that pizotyline could be used in the treatment of serotonin syndrome or MDMA overdose in a similar manner to the closely related antihistamine/anti-serotonin medication cyproheptadine.

Pizotifen might be useful as a hallucinogen antidote or "trip killer" in blocking the effects of serotonergic psychedelics like psilocybin. It might also be useful in the treatment of MDMA overdose.

== Contraindications ==
Caution is required in patients having closed angle glaucoma and in patients with a predisposition to urinary retention as the medication exhibits a relatively small anticholinergic effect. Dose adjustment is required in people who have chronic kidney disease. Liver injury has also been reported. Pizotifen treatment should be discontinued if there is any clinical evidence of liver dysfunction during treatment. Caution is advised in patients having a history of epilepsy. Withdrawal symptoms like depression, tremor, nausea, anxiety, malaise, dizziness, sleep disorder and weight decrease have been reported following abrupt cessation of pizotifen.

Pizotifen is contraindicated in patients who suffer from hypersensitivity to any of its components or have gastric outlet obstruction, angle-closure glaucoma, and difficulty urinating. In addition, women who are pregnant should not take pizotifen.

== Adverse effects ==
Side effects include sedation, dry mouth, drowsiness, increased appetite and weight gain. Occasionally it may cause nausea, headaches, or dizziness. In rare cases, anxiety, aggression and depression may also occur.

== Pharmacology ==
=== Pharmacodynamics ===
Pizotifen activities
Target	Affinity (K_{i}, nM)	Species
5-HT_{1A}	39–270 (K_{i}); 535 (EC_{50}); 60% (E_{max})	Human; Human; Human
5-HT_{1B}	1,415	Human
5-HT_{1D}	770	Human
5-HT_{1E}	820	Human
5-HT_{2A}	2.0	Human
5-HT_{2B}	2.0–2.3	Human
5-HT_{2C}	8.4	Human
5-HT_{3}	95	Human
5-HT_{4}	ND	Human
5-HT_{5A}	110	Human
5-HT_{6}	74	Human
5-HT_{7}	17–25	Human
D_{1}	3.5	Human
D_{2}	2.4–87	Human
D_{3}	ND	ND
D_{4}	64	Human
D_{5}	50	Human
α_{1A}	65	Human
α_{1B}	>10,000	Human
α_{2A}	660	Human
α_{2B}	225	Human
α_{2C}	390	Human
β_{1}	>10,000	Human
β_{2}	>10,000	Human
H_{1}	1.9	Human
H_{2}	1.4	Human
M_{1}	67	Human
M_{2}	34	Human
M_{3}	29	Human
M_{4}	130	Human
M_{5}	6.8	Human
I_{1} receptor	121	Human
σ_{1} receptor	>10,000	Guinea pig
σ_{2} receptor	6,450	Rat
SERT	>10,000	Human
NET	710	Human
DAT	>10,000	Human
Note: The smaller the value, the more avidly the compound binds to or activates the site. Refs:

Pizotifen is a serotonin antagonist acting mainly at the 5-HT_{2A}, 5-HT_{2B}, and 5-HT_{2C} receptors. It also has some activity as an antihistamine as well as some anticholinergic activity. The drug binds non-selectively to many targets, including serotonin, dopamine, adrenergic, histamine, and muscarinic acetylcholine receptors. Besides its serotonin 5-HT_{2} receptor antagonism, pizotifen is a low-potency moderate-efficacy partial agonist of the serotonin 5-HT_{1A} receptor.

Pizotifen is able to dose-dependently and fully antagonize the discriminative stimulus effects of the serotonin–norepinephrine–dopamine releasing agent and serotonin 5-HT_{2} receptor agonist MDMA in rodent drug discrimination tests. Conversely, the related drug cyproheptadine was only partially effective and clozapine was ineffective. All three of these agents, pizotifen, cyproheptadine, and clozapine act as non-selective monoamine receptor antagonists. Pizotifen also fully blocks the effects of serotonergic psychedelics, including LSD, mescaline, 5-MeO-DMT, and DOM, in drug discrimination tests.

The antimigraine activity of pizotifen might be specifically due to serotonin 5-HT_{2B} receptor blockade.

=== Pharmacokinetics ===
The elimination half-life of pizotifen is 23 hours.

== Chemistry ==
Pizotifen is a tricyclic compound and is specifically a benzocycloheptene.

Close analogues of pizotifen include ketotifen and cyproheptadine, among others.

== History ==
Pizotifen was first described in the literature by 1964.

== Society and culture ==
=== Names ===
Pizotifen is the generic name of the drug and its INN and BAN, while pizotyline is its USAN. Brand names of pizotifen include Sandomigran, Mosegor, and Litec, among others.

=== Availability ===
Pizotifen is available widely throughout the world, including in Europe.
