= LY03017 =

Clinical data
- Other names: LY-03017; LPM-526000133; LPM526000133
- Routes of administration: Oral
- Drug class: Serotonin 5-HT_{2} receptor antagonist; Serotonin 5-HT_{2A} receptor inverse agonist; Serotonin 5-HT_{2C} receptor antagonist

LY03017, also known as LPM-526000133, is a serotonin 5-HT_{2} receptor antagonist which is under development for the treatment of schizophrenia and Alzheimer's psychosis. It acts specifically as a dual serotonin 5-HT_{2A} receptor inverse agonist and serotonin 5-HT_{2C} receptor antagonist. The drug is under development by Luye Pharma Group in China. As of December 2025, it is in phase 1 clinical trials. The chemical structure of LY03017 does not yet appear to have been disclosed.

== See also ==
- Serotonin 5-HT_{2A} receptor antagonist
- List of investigational antipsychotics
