= NH130 =

Clinical data
- Other names: NH-130
- Routes of administration: Oral
- Drug class: Serotonin 5-HT_{2A} receptor antagonist; Antipsychotic

Pharmacokinetic data
- Onset of action: 3.0–4.5 hours (T_{max}
- Elimination half-life: 13.7–18.2 hours

NH130 is a highly selective serotonin 5-HT_{2A} receptor inverse agonist which is under development for the treatment of Parkinson's disease psychosis. It is taken orally. The drug's time to peak levels is 3.0 to 4.5 hours and its elimination half-life is 13.7 to 18.2 hours. NH130 is under development by Jiangsu Nhwa Pharmaceutical in China. As of November 2025, it is in phase 2 clinical trials.

== See also ==
- Serotonin 5-HT_{2A} receptor antagonist
- List of investigational Parkinson's disease drugs
