= Ritanserin =

Chemical compound

Clinical data
- Other names: R-55667; R55667; Tiserton
- Routes of administration: Oral
- Drug class: Serotonin 5-HT_{2} receptor antagonist; Serotonin 5-HT_{2A} receptor antagonist
- ATC code: None

Pharmacokinetic data
- Onset of action: 1.7 hours (T_{max})
- Elimination half-life: 54 hours

Identifiers
- IUPAC name: 6-[2-[4-[bis(4-fluorophenyl)methylidene]piperidin-1-yl]ethyl]-7-methyl-[1,3]thiazolo[2,3-b]pyrimidin-5-one
- CAS Number: 87051-43-2
- PubChem CID: 5074
- IUPHAR/BPS: 97
- ChemSpider: 4896
- UNII: 145TFV465S
- ChEBI: CHEBI:64195
- ChEMBL: ChEMBL267777
- CompTox Dashboard (EPA): DTXSID9042594
- ECHA InfoCard: 100.163.772

Chemical and physical data
- Formula: C_{27}H_{25}F_{2}N_{3}OS
- Molar mass: 477.57 g·mol^{−1}
- 3D model (JSmol): Interactive image
- SMILES: CC1=C(C(=O)N2C=CSC2=N1)CCN3CCC(=C(C4=CC=C(C=C4)F)C5=CC=C(C=C5)F)CC3
- InChI: InChI=1S/C27H25F2N3OS/c1-18-24(26(33)32-16-17-34-27(32)30-18)12-15-31-13-10-21(11-14-31)25(19-2-6-22(28)7-3-19)20-4-8-23(29)9-5-20/h2-9,16-17H,10-15H2,1H3; Key:JUQLTPCYUFPYKE-UHFFFAOYSA-N

Ritanserin, also known by its developmental code name R-55667, is a serotonin receptor antagonist which was under development for the treatment of anxiety disorders and major depressive disorder but was never marketed. It was also investigated for treatment of insomnia, especially to enhance sleep quality by significantly increasing slow wave sleep by virtue of potent and concomitant serotonin 5-HT_{2A} and 5-HT_{2C} receptor antagonism. The drug is taken orally.

== Pharmacology ==
=== Pharmacodynamics ===
Ritanserin acts as a selective 5-HT_{2A} (K_{i} = 0.45 nM) and 5-HT_{2C} receptor (K_{i} = 0.71 nM) antagonist. It has relatively low affinity for the H_{1}, D_{2}, α_{1}-adrenergic, and α_{2}-adrenergic receptors (39-, 77-, 107-, and 166-fold lower relative to 5-HT_{2A}, respectively). The affinity of ritanserin for the 5-HT_{1A} receptor is less than 1 μM. In addition to its affinity for the 5-HT_{2A} and 5-HT_{2C} receptors, ritanserin also binds to and antagonizes the 5-HT_{1D}, 5-HT_{2B}, 5-HT_{5A}, 5-HT_{6}, and 5-HT_{7} receptors.

Ritanserin blocks c-RAF activation and induces apoptotic cell death of non–small cell lung cancer and small cell lung cancer cells.

=== Pharmacokinetics ===
The time to peak levels of ritanserin is 1.7 hours. Its elimination half-life is 54 hours.

== Chemistry ==
=== Synthesis ===
Synthesis: Patents:

Aminothiazole (2-thiazolamine) (1) is condensed with 2-acetylbutyrolactone [517-23-7] (2) under DS-trap until the water has separated. Condensation of this β-keto lactone can be visualized to involve initial attack on the reactive butyrolactone by the primary nitrogen; cyclodehydration of that hypothetical intermediate 3 gives 6-(2-hydroxyethyl)-7-methyl-[1,3]thiazolo[3,2-a]pyrimidin-5-one, CID:82612453 (4). Halogenation of the terminal alcohol with phosphorus oxychloride then yields 6-(2-chloroethyl)- 7-methyl-5H-thiazolo[3,2-a]pyrimidin-5-one, [86488-00-8] (5). Alkylation with 4-(bis(4-fluorophenyl)methylene)piperidine, [58113-36-3] (6) would complete the synthesis of ritanserin (7).

== History ==
The atypical antipsychotic risperidone was developed via structural modification of ritanserin.

== Society and culture ==
=== Names ===
Ritanserin is the generic name of the drug and its INN, USAN, and BAN. It is also known by its developmental code name R-55667.

=== Availability ===
Ritanserin was never approved or marketed for medical use.

== Research ==
Ritanserin was tested in clinical trials for depression, anxiety, schizophrenia, and migraine. It was also found to improve sleep in human volunteers. It reached phase 3 clinical trials for major depressive disorder prior to the discontinuation of its development.

Some of the safety liabilities that led to its discontinuation of ritanserin for treatment of insomnia have led to its potential repurposing in the field of oncology. Specifically, it acts as a potent inhibitor of diacylglycerol kinase alpha (DGKα). As such, it may be used to treat certain types of glioblastoma and melanoma. It has also been used as a reference compound to identify putatively more selective and potent DGKα inhibitors to treat these forms of cancer as well as possibly others.

== See also ==
- Serotonin 5-HT_{2A} receptor antagonist
- Ketanserin
- Setoperone
