= Acadia Pharmaceuticals =

American pharmaceutical company

Acadia Pharmaceuticals Inc.
- Formerly: Receptor Technologies
- Type: Public
- Traded as: Nasdaq: ACAD; Russell 2000 component; S&P 600 component
- Industry: Biopharmaceutical; Healthcare
- Founded: 1993; 33 years ago
- Headquarters: San Diego, California, U.S.
- Key people: Stephen R. Davis (CEO)
- Products: Pimavanserin
- Revenue: ▲US$339.08 million (2019)
- Operating income: ▲US$−246.55 million (2019)
- Net income: ▲US$−235.26 million (2019)
- Total assets: ▲US$783.18 million (2019)
- Total equity: ▲US$699.14 million (2019)
- Number of employees: 570 (June 30, 2020)
- Website: acadia.com

Acadia Pharmaceuticals Inc. is a biopharmaceutical company headquartered in Del Mar, California.

== Product development ==
Nuplazid, a drug developed by Acadia in the late 1990s, "was designed to stimulate a subset of the brain’s serotonin receptors, or the proteins that govern memory, cognition and learning." On April 29, 2016, the FDA approved Acadia's drug, Nuplazid, for the treatment of hallucinations and delusions associated with Parkinson's disease psychosis. Nuplazid is the trade name for Acadia's proprietary molecule, pimavanserin, a selective serotonin inverse agonist preferentially targeting 5-HT2a receptors. Acadia had partnered with Biovail in the late-stage clinical testing of the drug, which showed trial failures as of 2009.

Acadia is running multiple Phase 2 and Phase 3 trials with pimavanserin in several central nervous system conditions: dementia-related psychosis, major depressive disorder, schizophrenia inadequate response, and schizophrenia negative symptoms.

As of 1997, Acadia was among several companies that licensed compounds from Genzyme's small-molecule compound library.

In 2023, the FDA approved trofinetide (marketed as Daybue) for use in Rett syndrome.

== History ==
Acadia started in 1993 as Receptor Technologies, based in Winooski, Vermont. In 1997, the company relocated all operations and management from Vermont to San Diego, California, as a strategic move to garner partnerships with other biotechnology companies. However, the company also had an office in Denmark, in which it received a crucial part of its early investments from BankInvest, under managing director Florian Schönharting, Kommunernes Pensionsforsikring A/S and Dansk Kapitalanlæg Aktieselskab as well as private investor Lars Christiansen. At the time, the company had fifty employees, fourteen of whom were in the Denmark office. The focus of the company in its early years was on genetic screens for receptors, aiming to accelerate early stage drug discovery.

The company planned to conduct an initial public offering (IPO) consisting of 31.6% of the company in 2001, with the intention of raising US$64 million and listing on the NASDAQ exchange under the symbol ACAD. At the time, Acadia and Allergan were collaborating on development of a treatment for glaucoma, and Allergan would retain a 6.3% ownership stake in Acadia after the IPO. However, the company's IPO, which ultimately took place in May 2004, did not fare as well as expected and netted only US$35 million. At the time, the company had five drugs in development and was running two in human trials. The company had a subsequent round of stock offering in May 2007 which raised US$102 million.

In September 2020, Acadia Pharmaceuticals acquired clinical-stage biotechnology company CerSci Therapeutics.

=== Corporate governance ===
In 2001, the company's chief executive officer at the time, Leonard R. Borrmann, left Acadia to lead Maret Pharmaceuticals. He was succeeded by Uli Hacksell, who left Acadia to lead Cerecor at the beginning of 2016.
