= Fananserin =

Chemical compound

Clinical data
- Other names: RP-62203; RP62203
- Drug class: Serotonin 5-HT_{2A} receptor antagonist; Dopamine D_{4} receptor antagonist
- ATC code: None

Identifiers
- IUPAC name: 2-(3-(4-(p-Fluorophenyl)-1-piperazinyl)propyl)-2H-naphth(1,8-cd)isothiazole 1,1-dioxide
- CAS Number: 127625-29-0
- PubChem CID: 60785
- IUPHAR/BPS: 5434
- ChemSpider: 54781
- UNII: 38QJ762ET6
- KEGG: D02656
- CompTox Dashboard (EPA): DTXSID8046743

Chemical and physical data
- Formula: C_{23}H_{24}FN_{3}O_{2}S
- Molar mass: 425.52 g·mol^{−1}
- 3D model (JSmol): Interactive image
- SMILES: C1CN(CCN1CCCN2C3=CC=CC4=C3C(=CC=C4)S2(=O)=O)C5=CC=C(C=C5)F
- InChI: InChI=1S/C23H24FN3O2S/c24-19-8-10-20(11-9-19)26-16-14-25(15-17-26)12-3-13-27-21-6-1-4-18-5-2-7-22(23(18)21)30(27,28)29/h1-2,4-11H,3,12-17H2; Key:VGIGHGMPMUCLIQ-UHFFFAOYSA-N

Fananserin (RP-62203) is a drug which acts as a potent antagonist at both the serotonin 5-HT_{2A} receptor, and the dopamine D_{4} receptor, but without blocking other dopamine receptors such as the dopamine D_{2} receptor. It has sedative and antipsychotic effects, and has been researched for the treatment of schizophrenia, although efficacy was less than expected and results were disappointing.

== See also ==
- Serotonin 5-HT_{2A} receptor antagonist
- List of investigational antidepressants
- List of investigational antipsychotics
