= Trelanserin =

Clinical data
- Other names: SL 65.0472; SL-650472; SL650472
- Routes of administration: Oral
- Drug class: Serotonin 5-HT_{1B} receptor antagonist; Serotonin 5-HT_{2A} receptor antagonist; Anticoagulant
- ATC code: None

Identifiers
- IUPAC name: 2-[7-fluoro-2-oxo-4-[2-(4-thieno[3,2-c]pyridin-4-ylpiperazin-1-yl)ethyl]quinolin-1-yl]acetamide
- CAS Number: 189003-92-7
- PubChem CID: 9869105
- DrugBank: DB18793
- ChemSpider: 8044796
- UNII: QUD44MBL5S
- ChEMBL: ChEMBL3183740

Chemical and physical data
- Formula: C_{24}H_{24}FN_{5}O_{2}S
- Molar mass: 465.55 g·mol^{−1}
- 3D model (JSmol): Interactive image
- SMILES: C1CN(CCN1CCC2=CC(=O)N(C3=C2C=CC(=C3)F)CC(=O)N)C4=NC=CC5=C4C=CS5
- InChI: InChI=1S/C24H24FN5O2S/c25-17-1-2-18-16(13-23(32)30(15-22(26)31)20(18)14-17)4-7-28-8-10-29(11-9-28)24-19-5-12-33-21(19)3-6-27-24/h1-3,5-6,12-14H,4,7-11,15H2,(H2,26,31); Key:JDLYOFUDIKMYBL-UHFFFAOYSA-N

Trelanserin (INN; developmental code name SL 65.0472) is a dual serotonin 5-HT_{1B} receptor antagonist and serotonin 5-HT_{2A} receptor antagonist which was under development for the treatment of peripheral arterial occlusive disorders and thrombosis but was never marketed. It is taken orally. The drug was under development by Sanofi-Aventis. It reached phase 2 clinical trials prior to the discontinuation of its development in 2009. Trelanserin was first described in the scientific literature by 2000.

== See also ==
- Serotonin 5-HT_{2A} receptor antagonist
