= LY-2624803 =

Clinical data
- Other names: LY2624803; HY-10275; HY10275
- Routes of administration: Oral
- Drug class: Histamine H_{1} receptor antagonist; Serotonin 5-HT_{2A} receptor antagonist; Sedative; Hypnotic
- ATC code: None

Identifiers
- IUPAC name: 3-(4-benzo[b][1,4]benzoxazepin-6-ylpiperazin-1-yl)-2,2-dimethylpropanoic acid
- CAS Number: 879409-35-5
- PubChem CID: 11567064
- DrugBank: DB15092
- ChemSpider: 9741835
- UNII: 63J9EQ81YC
- ChEMBL: ChEMBL5314393

Chemical and physical data
- Formula: C_{22}H_{25}N_{3}O_{3}
- Molar mass: 379.460 g·mol^{−1}
- 3D model (JSmol): Interactive image
- SMILES: CC(C)(CN1CCN(CC1)C2=NC3=CC=CC=C3OC4=CC=CC=C42)C(=O)O
- InChI: InChI=1S/C22H25N3O3/c1-22(2,21(26)27)15-24-11-13-25(14-12-24)20-16-7-3-5-9-18(16)28-19-10-6-4-8-17(19)23-20/h3-10H,11-15H2,1-2H3,(H,26,27); Key:UEFWDVMEDFCHGW-UHFFFAOYSA-N

LY-2624803, also known as HY-10275, is a dual histamine H_{1} receptor and serotonin 5-HT_{2A} receptor antagonist which was under development for the treatment of insomnia but was never marketed. It is taken orally.

== Pharmacology ==
The drug is described as a high-affinity highly selective histamine H_{1} receptor inverse agonist with additional strong serotonin 5-HT_{2A} receptor antagonism or inverse agonism. The precise balance of these activities has not been disclosed. It was found to dose-dependently increase slow wave sleep in animals. In a phase 2 clinical trial, the drug was found to significantly reduce wake after sleep onset (WASO) (by 35 minutes at 1 mg and by 62 minutes at 3 mg) as well as to reduce sleep onset latency in humans. No next-day residual fatigue was observed. In terms of chemical structure, it is an analogue of tricyclic compounds like quetiapine and amoxapine.

== Development ==
LY-2624803 was under development by Eli Lilly and Hypnion. Its development was discontinued in 2011. The drug reached phase 2 trials prior to the discontinuation of its development. Besides doxepin (Silenor; SO-101) and esmirtazapine (ORG-50081), it was one of the only histamine H_{1} receptor antagonists to have reached phase 2 trials for treatment of insomnia.

== See also ==
- Serotonin 5-HT_{2A} receptor antagonist
- List of investigational insomnia drugs
