= VU0530244 =

Peripherally selective 5-HT2B antagonist

Clinical data
- Other names: VU-0530244
- Drug class: Selective peripherally restricted serotonin 5-HT_{2B} receptor antagonist

Identifiers
- IUPAC name: [5-(4-fluorophenyl)-2-methylpyrazol-3-yl]-[3-(6-methyl-1H-benzimidazol-2-yl)azetidin-1-yl]methanone
- CAS Number: 1396886-30-8
- PubChem CID: 71783796
- ChemSpider: 30683125

Chemical and physical data
- Formula: C_{22}H_{20}FN_{5}O
- Molar mass: 389.434 g·mol^{−1}
- 3D model (JSmol): Interactive image
- SMILES: CC1=CC2=C(C=C1)N=C(N2)C3CN(C3)C(=O)C4=CC(=NN4C)C5=CC=C(C=C5)F
- InChI: InChI=1S/C22H20FN5O/c1-13-3-8-17-19(9-13)25-21(24-17)15-11-28(12-15)22(29)20-10-18(26-27(20)2)14-4-6-16(23)7-5-14/h3-10,15H,11-12H2,1-2H3,(H,24,25); Key:JWLJKHOGMOIRDR-UHFFFAOYSA-N

VU0530244 is a potent, selective, and putatively peripherally restricted serotonin 5-HT_{2B} receptor antagonist which was first described in 2023. Another similar drug, VU0631019, was also described alongside VU0530244. They were identified via high-throughput screening (HTS).

The affinity (IC_{50}) of VU0530244 for the serotonin 5-HT_{2B} receptor was found to be 17.3 nM. Its affinity (IC_{50}) values at the serotonin 5-HT_{2A} and 5-HT_{2C} receptors were greater than 10,000 nM (>578-fold less than for the serotonin 5-HT_{2B} receptor). The drug is predicted to be a robust P-glycoprotein substrate and hence is expected to have very limited blood–brain barrier permeability.

Serotonin 5-HT_{2B} receptor antagonists are of interest for potential use in medicine to treat pulmonary arterial hypertension, valvular heart disease, and related cardiopathies. However, reduced serotonin 5-HT_{2B} receptor signaling in the central nervous system has been linked to adverse effects such as impulsivity, suicidality, and sleep disturbances, among others. Such potential side effects can be avoided with the use of peripherally restricted serotonin 5-HT_{2B} receptor antagonists.

In addition, activation of serotonin 5-HT_{2B} receptors is thought to be responsible for development of cardiac fibrosis and valvulopathy as well as pulmonary hypertension with certain serotonergic agents, including direct serotonin 5-HT_{2B} receptor agonists like cabergoline, ergotamine, methysergide, and pergolide, serotonin releasing agents like chlorphentermine and aminorex, and dual serotonin 5-HT_{2B} receptor agonists and serotonin releasing agents like fenfluramine, dexfenfluramine, benfluorex, and MDMA. Serotonergic psychedelics like lysergic acid diethylamide (LSD) and psilocybin as well as entactogens like MDMA are also potent serotonin 5-HT_{2B} receptor agonists, and there have been concerns about chronic administration of these and related agents in medical contexts due to possible development of cardiac and other complications. Selective serotonin 5-HT_{2B} receptor antagonism has been found to fully prevent the cardiotoxicity of dexnorfenfluramine in rodents.

In 2024, the paper that described the discovery of the VU0530244 won the 2023 Rosalind Franklin Society Special Award in Science for contributions to the journal Assay and Drug Development Technologies.

== See also ==
- BW-501C67
- Xylamidine
