= Metrenperone =

Clinical data
- Other names: R-50970; R50970; R-50,970
- Drug class: Serotonin 5-HT_{2A} receptor antagonist
- ATC code: None

Identifiers
- IUPAC name: 3-[2-[4-(4-fluorobenzoyl)piperidin-1-yl]ethyl]-2,7-dimethylpyrido[1,2-a]pyrimidin-4-one
- CAS Number: 81043-56-3
- PubChem CID: 72005
- DrugBank: DB21312
- ChemSpider: 65004
- UNII: W1O4FV809G
- KEGG: D05015
- ChEMBL: ChEMBL2104852
- CompTox Dashboard (EPA): DTXSID20230867
- ECHA InfoCard: 100.072.413

Chemical and physical data
- Formula: C_{24}H_{26}FN_{3}O_{2}
- Molar mass: 407.489 g·mol^{−1}
- 3D model (JSmol): Interactive image
- SMILES: CC1=CN2C(=NC(=C(C2=O)CCN3CCC(CC3)C(=O)C4=CC=C(C=C4)F)C)C=C1
- InChI: InChI=1S/C24H26FN3O2/c1-16-3-8-22-26-17(2)21(24(30)28(22)15-16)11-14-27-12-9-19(10-13-27)23(29)18-4-6-20(25)7-5-18/h3-8,15,19H,9-14H2,1-2H3; Key:AXQRPYKSPHUOGZ-UHFFFAOYSA-N

Metrenperone (INN, USAN, BAN; developmental code name R-50970) is a serotonin 5-HT_{2} receptor antagonist which was never marketed. The drug also shows lower affinity for the α_{1}-adrenergic and histamine H_{1} receptor and much lower affinity for the dopamine D_{2} receptor, but no affinity for the serotonin 5-HT_{1} and muscarinic acetylcholine receptors. It is a weak antagonist of the α_{1}-adrenergic receptor in addition to its potent serotonin 5-HT_{2A} receptor antagonism. Metrenperone has been investigated for use in veterinary medicine to treat acute respiratory distress in cattle and has also been studied for topical treatment of wounds as well as injuries. It was first described in the scientific literature by 1982.

== See also ==
- Serotonin 5-HT_{2A} receptor antagonist
