= Temanogrel =

Clinical data
- Other names: APD-791; APD791
- Routes of administration: Oral
- Drug class: Serotonin 5-HT_{2A} receptor antagonist

Identifiers
- IUPAC name: 3-methoxy-N-[3-(2-methylpyrazol-3-yl)-4-(2-morpholin-4-ylethoxy)phenyl]benzamide
- CAS Number: 887936-68-7
- PubChem CID: 11604525
- ChemSpider: 9779281
- UNII: F42Z27575A
- KEGG: D09976
- ChEBI: CHEBI:177604
- ChEMBL: ChEMBL1084617
- CompTox Dashboard (EPA): DTXSID70237321

Chemical and physical data
- Formula: C_{24}H_{28}N_{4}O_{4}
- Molar mass: 436.512 g·mol^{−1}
- 3D model (JSmol): Interactive image
- SMILES: CN1C(=CC=N1)C2=C(C=CC(=C2)NC(=O)C3=CC(=CC=C3)OC)OCCN4CCOCC4
- InChI: InChI=1S/C24H28N4O4/c1-27-22(8-9-25-27)21-17-19(26-24(29)18-4-3-5-20(16-18)30-2)6-7-23(21)32-15-12-28-10-13-31-14-11-28/h3-9,16-17H,10-15H2,1-2H3,(H,26,29); Key:ZEOQUKRCASTCFR-UHFFFAOYSA-N

Temanogrel (INN, USAN; developmental code name APD791) is a serotonin 5-HT_{2A} receptor antagonist and inverse agonist which is under development for the treatment of myocardial ischemia and Raynaud's disease. It was also being developed for arterial thrombosis and acute coronary syndromes, but development for the former use was suspended and development for the latter indication was discontinued. The drug is taken orally. Temanogrel is highly selective for the serotonin 5-HT_{2A} receptor, with more than 2,000-fold selectivity for this receptor over the serotonin 5-HT_{2B} and 5-HT_{2C} receptors and lack of activity at a variety of other G protein-coupled receptors (GPCRs). As of September 2022, it is in phase 2 clinical trials for myocardial ischemia and Raynaud's disease.

== See also ==
- Serotonin 5-HT_{2A} receptor antagonist
