= Cinanserin =

Chemical compound

Clinical data
- Other names: SQ-10643; SQ10643; NSC-125717; NSC125717
- Drug class: Serotonin 5-HT_{2} receptor antagonist; Serotonin 5-HT_{2A} receptor antagonist
- ATC code: None

Identifiers
- IUPAC name: (2E)-N-(2-{[3-(dimethylamino)propyl]thio}phenyl)-3-phenylacrylamide
- CAS Number: 1166-34-3
- PubChem CID: 5475158
- ChemSpider: 4584027
- UNII: KI6J9OY7A3
- ChEBI: CHEBI:145999
- ChEMBL: ChEMBL18786
- CompTox Dashboard (EPA): DTXSID30859588 DTXSID7045653, DTXSID30859588
- ECHA InfoCard: 100.220.552

Chemical and physical data
- Formula: C_{20}H_{24}N_{2}OS
- Molar mass: 340.49 g·mol^{−1}
- 3D model (JSmol): Interactive image
- SMILES: CN(C)CCCSC1=CC=CC=C1NC(=O)\C=C\C2=CC=CC=C2
- InChI: InChI=1S/C20H24N2OS/c1-22(2)15-8-16-24-19-12-7-6-11-18(19)21-20(23)14-13-17-9-4-3-5-10-17/h3-7,9-14H,8,15-16H2,1-2H3,(H,21,23)/b14-13+; Key:RSUVYMGADVXGOU-BUHFOSPRSA-N

Cinanserin (INN; developmental code name SQ-10643) is a serotonin 5-HT_{2A} and 5-HT_{2C} receptor antagonist which was discovered in the 1960s and was never marketed. It has about 50-fold higher affinity for the 5-HT_{2A} receptor than for 5-HT_{2C}, and very low affinity for 5-HT_{1} receptors. The drug also inhibits the 3C-like protease of SARS-CoV-1 and SARS-CoV-2, but with much lower affinity.

== See also ==
- Serotonin 5-HT_{2A} receptor antagonist
- Sarpogrelate
- Ketanserin
- Ritanserin
