= Irindalone =

Clinical data
- Other names: LU-21098; LU21098; Lu 21-098
- Drug class: Serotonin; 5-HT_{2} receptor antagonist; Serotonin 5-HT_{2A} receptor antagonist
- ATC code: None

Identifiers
- IUPAC name: 1-[2-[4-[(1R,3S)-3-(4-fluorophenyl)-2,3-dihydro-1H-inden-1-yl]piperazin-1-yl]ethyl]imidazolidin-2-one
- CAS Number: 96478-43-2
- PubChem CID: 65845
- DrugBank: DB19936
- ChemSpider: 59257
- UNII: 4F39T8N10K
- ChEMBL: ChEMBL73461
- CompTox Dashboard (EPA): DTXSID30242274

Chemical and physical data
- Formula: C_{24}H_{29}FN_{4}O
- Molar mass: 408.521 g·mol^{−1}
- 3D model (JSmol): Interactive image
- SMILES: C1CN(C(=O)N1)CCN2CCN(CC2)[C@@H]3C[C@H](C4=CC=CC=C34)C5=CC=C(C=C5)F
- InChI: InChI=1S/C24H29FN4O/c25-19-7-5-18(6-8-19)22-17-23(21-4-2-1-3-20(21)22)28-14-11-27(12-15-28)13-16-29-10-9-26-24(29)30/h1-8,22-23H,9-17H2,(H,26,30)/t22-,23+/m0/s1; Key:GHAMYXPEZSUOCU-XZOQPEGZSA-N

Irindalone (INN; developmental code name LU-21098 or Lu 21-098) is a predominantly peripherally acting, highly potent, and selective serotonin 5-HT_{2} receptor antagonist which was under development for the treatment of hypertension but was never marketed. It is known to act as a serotonin 5-HT_{2A} and 5-HT_{2C} receptor antagonist. In addition, unlike ketanserin and cinanserin, the drug blocks the serotonin receptors in the rat fundus strip, which may correspond to the serotonin 5-HT_{2B} receptor. It shows weak affinity for the α_{1}-adrenergic receptor, where it is antagonistic as well. Irindalone was first described in the scientific literature by 1988. It reached phase 2 clinical trials for hypertension prior to the discontinuation of its development in 1989. In addition to hypertension, irindalone was later studied in the early 2000s for use in combination with a selective serotonin reuptake inhibitor (SSRI) to augment serotonin levels via serotonin 5-HT_{2C} receptor blockade and enhance antidepressant efficacy.

== See also ==
- Serotonin 5-HT_{2A} receptor antagonist
