= Peripherally selective drug =

Peripherally selective drugs have their primary mechanism of action outside of the central nervous system (CNS), usually because they are excluded from the CNS by the blood–brain barrier. By being excluded from the CNS, drugs may act on the rest of the body without producing side-effects related to their effects on the brain or spinal cord. For example, most opioids cause sedation when given at a sufficiently high dose, but peripherally selective opioids can act on the rest of the body without entering the brain and are less likely to cause sedation. These peripherally selective opioids can be used as antidiarrheals, for instance loperamide (Imodium).

Mechanisms of peripheral selectivity include physicochemical hydrophilicity and large molecular size, which prevent drug permeation through the lipid bilayer cell membranes of the blood–brain barrier, and efflux out of the brain by blood–brain barrier transporters such as P-glycoprotein among many others. Transport out of the brain by P-glycoprotein is thought to be responsible for the peripheral selectivity of many drugs, including loperamide, domperidone, fexofenadine, bilastine, cetirizine, ivermectin, and dexamethasone, among others.

== List of peripherally selective drugs ==
- 4-HO-TMT – a non-selective serotonin receptor agonist
- 5-Methoxytryptamine – a non-selective serotonin receptor agonist
- Aeruginascin – a non-selective serotonin receptor agonist
- α-Methylserotonin – a non-selective serotonin receptor agonist
- AL-34662 – a serotonin 5-HT_{2A} receptor agonist
- Alvimopan – a μ-opioid receptor antagonist used in the treatment of postoperative ileus
- Anastrozole – an aromatase inhibitor used in the treatment of breast cancer
- Atenolol – a beta blocker (β-adrenergic receptor antagonist)
- Baeocystin – a non-selective serotonin receptor agonist
- Benserazide – an aromatic L-amino acid decarboxylase inhibitor used in combination with levodopa in the treatment of Parkinson's disease
- Bethanechol – a muscarinic acetylcholine receptor agonist used in the treatment of dry mouth and urinary retention
- Bicalutamide – an antiandrogen with peripheral selectivity in animals but seemingly not in humans
- Bilastine – a non-sedating antihistamine
- Bisoprolol – a beta blocker (β-adrenergic receptor antagonist)
- Bufotenidine (5-HTQ) – a serotonin 5-HT_{3} receptor antagonist
- Bufotenin – a non-selective serotonin receptor agonist and serotonergic psychedelic
- BW-501C67 – a serotonin 5-HT_{2A} and 5-HT_{2C} receptor antagonist
- Carbachol – a non-selective acetylcholine receptor agonist used in the treatment of glaucoma
- Carbidopa – an aromatic L-amino acid decarboxylase inhibitor used in combination with levodopa in the treatment of Parkinson's disease
- Carmoxirole – a dopamine D_{2} receptor agonist
- Carteolol – a beta blocker (β-adrenergic receptor antagonist)
- Cetirizine – a non-sedating antihistamine
- Colchicine – an alkaloid and tubulin polymerization inhibitor used to treat gout
- Darolutamide – an antiandrogen used in the treatment of prostate cancer
- Desloratadine – a non-sedating antihistamine
- Dexamethasone – a glucocorticoid with some peripheral selectivity
- Digoxin – a cardiac glycoside and sodium–potassium pump inhibitor
- Docarpamine – a dopamine prodrug and non-selective dopamine receptor agonist
- Domperidone – a dopamine D_{2} receptor antagonist used as an antiemetic, gastroprokinetic agent, and galactogogue
- Dopamine – a non-selective dopamine and adrenergic receptor agonist used as a cardiac stimulant and positive inotropic agent
- Eluxadoline – a μ- and κ-opioid receptor agonist and δ-opioid receptor antagonist used in the treatment of diarrhea-predominant irritable bowel syndrome
- Entacapone – a catechol-O-methyltransferase inhibitor used in combination with levodopa in the treatment of Parkinson's disease
- Epinephrine (adrenaline) – a non-selective adrenergic receptor agonist used as a cardiac stimulant and in the treatment of anaphylaxis
- Ergotamine – non-selective serotonin, adrenergic, and dopamine receptor modulator used as a vasoconstrictor to treat migraines
- Esmolol – a beta blocker (β-adrenergic receptor antagonist)
- Etamicastat – a dopamine β-hydroxylase inhibitor developed as an antihypertensive agent
- Etilefrine – a non-selective adrenergic receptor agonist used as an antihypotensive agent
- Fenoldopam – a dopamine D_{1} receptor agonist used as an antihypertensive agent
- Fexofenadine – a non-sedating antihistamine
- Fulvestrant – an antiestrogen used in the treatment of breast cancer
- GABA – a GABA receptor agonist and dietary supplement
- Glycopyrronium bromide – an anticholinergic (acetylcholine receptor antagonist)
- Guvacine – a GABA reuptake inhibitor
- Hyoscine butylbromide – an anticholinergic (acetylcholine receptor antagonist)
- Isoprenaline – a β-adrenergic receptor agonist used as a sympathomimetic
- Itopride – a dopamine D_{2} receptor antagonist and acetylcholinesterase inhibitor used as a gastroprokinetic agent
- Ivermectin – an antiparasitic
- Labetalol – a beta blocker (β-adrenergic receptor antagonist)
- Levocetirizine – a non-sedating antihistamine
- Loperamide – a μ-opioid receptor agonist used as an antidiarrheal
- Loratadine – a non-sedating antihistamine
- Methacholine – a choline ester and muscarinic acetylcholine receptor agonist
- Methylhomatropine – an anticholinergic (acetylcholine receptor antagonist)
- Methylnaltrexone – a μ-opioid receptor antagonist used in the treatment of opioid-induced constipation
- Metopimazine – a dopamine D_{2} receptor antagonist used in the treatment of nausea, vomiting, and gastroparesis
- Midodrine – an α_{1}-adrenergic receptor agonist used in the treatment of orthostatic hypotension
- Monlunabant – a cannabinoid CB_{1} receptor antagonist
- Muscarine – a muscarinic acetylcholine receptor agonist
- Nadolol – a beta blocker (β-adrenergic receptor antagonist)
- Naloxegol – a μ-opioid receptor antagonist used in the treatment of opioid-induced constipation
- Nebicapone – a catechol-O-methyltransferase inhibitor for Parkinson's disease that was never marketed
- Nipecotic acid – a GABA reuptake inhibitor
- Norepinephrine (noradrenaline) – a non-selective adrenergic receptor agonist
- Norpsilocin – a non-selective serotonin receptor agonist
- Ondansetron – a serotonin 5-HT_{3} receptor antagonist with some peripheral selectivity
- Opicapone – a catechol-O-methyltransferase inhibitor used in combination with levodopa in the treatment of Parkinson's disease
- Oxidopamine (6-hydroxydopamine; 6-OHDA) – a dopaminergic neurotoxin
- Peptides and proteins (e.g., insulin, oxytocin, vasopressin, opioid peptides, growth factors, many others)
- Phenylephrine – an α_{1}-adrenergic receptor agonist used as a decongestant, to treat hypotension, and for other uses
- Phenylpropanolamine – a norepinephrine releasing agent and indirectly acting sympathomimetic with some peripheral selectivity
- Pirenzepine – an anticholinergic (acetylcholine receptor antagonist)
- Pseudoephedrine – a norepinephrine releasing agent and indirectly acting sympathomimetic with some peripheral selectivity
- Pyridostigmine – an acetylcholinesterase inhibitor and parasympathomimetic
- Sarpogrelate a serotonin 5-HT_{2} receptor antagonist
- Serotonin – a non-selective serotonin receptor agonist
- Sotalol – a beta blocker (β-adrenergic receptor antagonist)
- Sumatriptan – a triptan antimigraine agent and serotonin 5-HT_{1B} and 5-HT_{1D} receptor agonist
- Terfenadine – a non-sedating antihistamine
- THPO – a GABA reuptake inhibitor
- Timepidium bromide – an anticholinergic (acetylcholine receptor antagonist)
- Tolcapone – a catechol-O-methyltransferase inhibitor used in combination with levodopa in the treatment of Parkinson's disease
- Trepipam – a dopamine D_{1} receptor agonist that was never marketed
- Trimetaphan camsilate – a nicotinic acetylcholine receptor antagonist
- Trospium chloride – an anticholinergic (acetylcholine receptor antagonist)
- Tyramine – a norepinephrine–dopamine releasing agent and sympathomimetic agent
- Vinblastine – a Vinca alkaloid and antineoplastic agent
- VU0530244 – a selective serotonin 5-HT_{2B} receptor antagonist
- Xamoterol – a β_{1}-adrenergic receptor partial agonist
- Xanomeline/trospium chloride – a combination of a centrally active M_{1} and M_{4} receptor muscarinic acetylcholine receptor agonist (xanomeline) and a peripherally selective non-selective muscarinic acetylcholine receptor antagonist (trospium chloride) used to treat schizophrenia
- Xylamidine – a serotonin 5-HT_{2A} and 5-HT_{2C} receptor antagonist
- Zamicastat – a dopamine β-hydroxylase inhibitor developed as an antihypertensive agent
- Zevaquenabant – a cannabinoid CB_{1} receptor antagonist

== See also ==
- Brain-to-blood ratio
