= Risperidone =

Antipsychotic medication

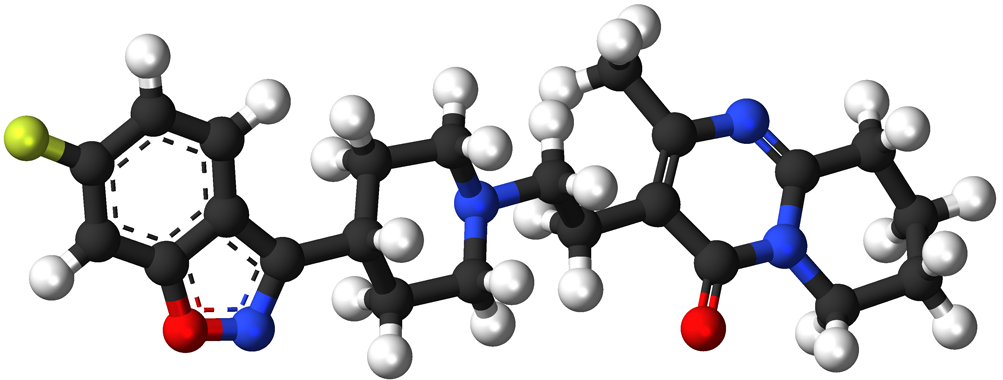

Clinical data
- Trade names: Risperdal, Okedi, others
- AHFS/Drugs.com: Monograph
- MedlinePlus: a694015
- License data: US DailyMed: Risperidone
- Pregnancy category: AU: C
- Routes of administration: By mouth, intramuscular, subcutaneous
- Drug class: Atypical antipsychotic
- ATC code: N05AX08 (WHO)

Legal status
- Legal status: AU: S4 (Prescription only); BR: Class C1 (Other controlled substances); CA: ℞-only; UK: POM (Prescription only); US: ℞-only; EU: Rx-only

Pharmacokinetic data
- Bioavailability: 70% (by mouth)
- Protein binding: 90% (parent compound), 77% (active metabolite)
- Metabolism: Liver (CYP2D6 mediated to 9-hydroxyrisperidone)
- Elimination half-life: 20 hours (by mouth), 3–6 days (IM)
- Excretion: Urinary (70%) feces (14%)

Identifiers
- IUPAC name: 3-[2-[4-(6-fluoro-1,2-benzoxazol-3-yl)piperidin-1-yl]ethyl]-2-methyl-6,7,8,9-tetrahydropyrido[1,2-a]pyrimidin-4-one
- CAS Number: 106266-06-2
- PubChem CID: 5073
- PubChem SID: 475100
- IUPHAR/BPS: 96
- DrugBank: DB00734
- ChemSpider: 4895
- UNII: L6UH7ZF8HC
- KEGG: D00426
- ChEBI: CHEBI:8871
- ChEMBL: ChEMBL85
- PDB ligand: 8NU (PDBe, RCSB PDB)
- CompTox Dashboard (EPA): DTXSID8045193
- ECHA InfoCard: 100.114.705

Chemical and physical data
- Formula: C_{23}H_{27}FN_{4}O_{2}
- Molar mass: 410.493 g·mol^{−1}
- 3D model (JSmol): Interactive image
- SMILES: Cc1c(c(=O)n2c(n1)CCCC2)CCN3CCC(CC3)c4c5ccc(cc5on4)F
- InChI: InChI=1S/C23H27FN4O2/c1-15-18(23(29)28-10-3-2-4-21(28)25-15)9-13-27-11-7-16(8-12-27)22-19-6-5-17(24)14-20(19)30-26-22/h5-6,14,16H,2-4,7-13H2,1H3; Key:RAPZEAPATHNIPO-UHFFFAOYSA-N

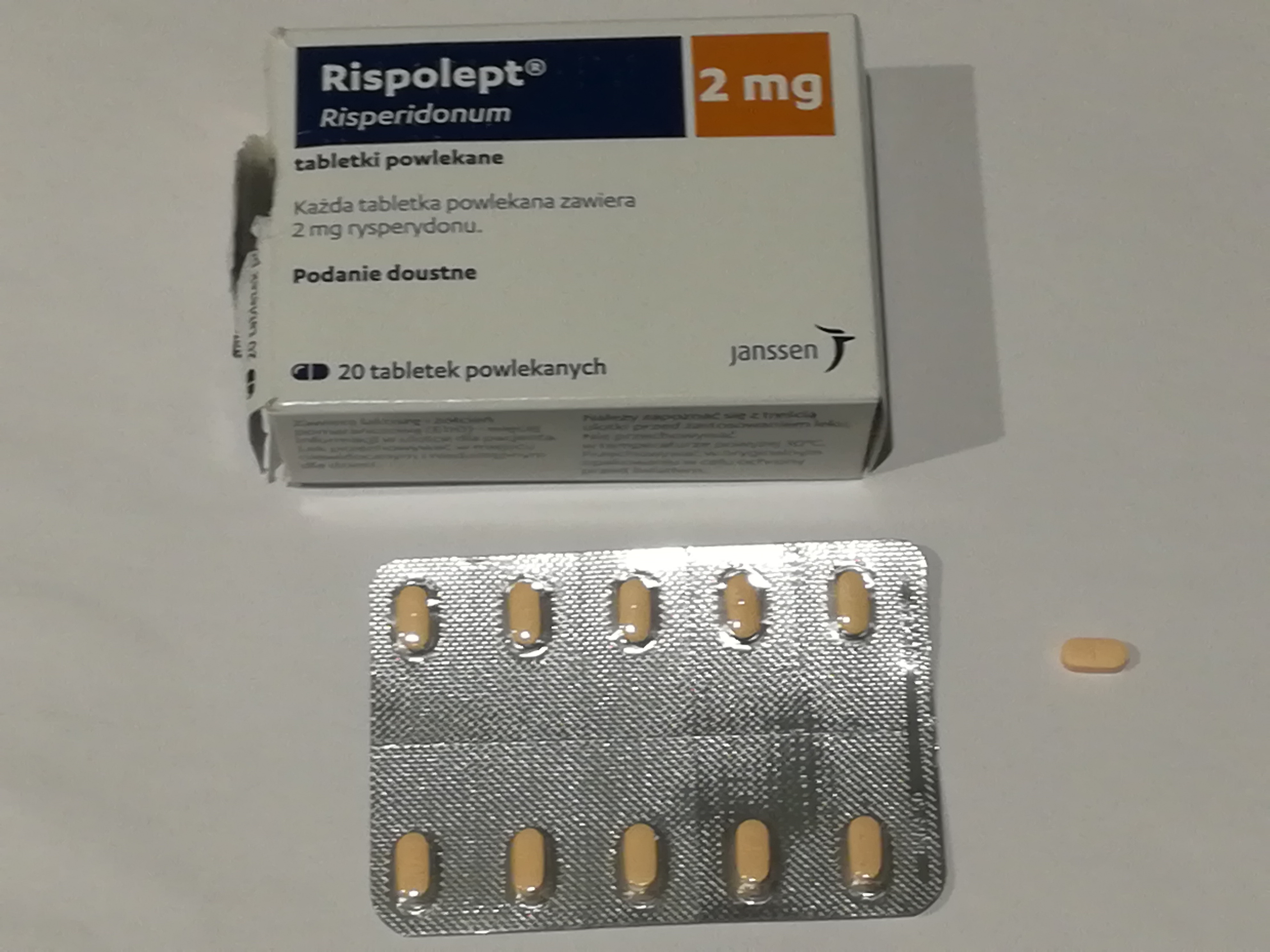
A box of Rispolept (Risperidone) tablets

Risperidone, sold under the brand name Risperdal among others, is an atypical antipsychotic used to treat schizophrenia and bipolar disorder, as well as aggressive and self-injurious behaviors associated with autism spectrum disorder. It is taken either by mouth or by injection (i.e., subcutaneous or intramuscular). The injectable versions are long-acting and last for 2–4 weeks.

Common side effects include weight gain, drowsiness, fatigue, insomnia, dry mouth, constipation, elevated prolactin levels, and restlessness. Serious side effects may include the potentially permanent movement disorder tardive dyskinesia, as well as neuroleptic malignant syndrome, an increased risk of suicide, and high blood sugar levels. In older people with psychosis as a result of dementia, it may increase the risk of death. It is unknown if it is safe for use in pregnancy. Its mechanism of action is not entirely clear, but is believed to be related to its action as a dopamine and serotonin antagonist.

Study of risperidone began in the late 1980s and it was approved for sale in the United States in 1993. It is on the World Health Organization's List of Essential Medicines. It is available as a generic medication. In 2023, it was the 176th most commonly prescribed medication in the United States, with more than 2 million prescriptions.

== Medical uses ==
Risperidone is mainly used for the treatment of schizophrenia, bipolar disorder, and irritability associated with autism.

=== Schizophrenia ===
Risperidone is effective in treating psychogenic polydipsia and the acute exacerbations of schizophrenia.

Studies evaluating the utility of risperidone by mouth for maintenance therapy have reached varying conclusions. A 2012 systematic review concluded that evidence is strong that risperidone is more effective than all first-generation antipsychotics other than haloperidol, but that evidence directly supporting its superiority to placebo for negative symptoms is equivocal. A 2011 review concluded that risperidone is more effective in relapse prevention than other first- and second-generation antipsychotics with the exception of olanzapine and clozapine. A 2016 Cochrane review suggests that risperidone reduces the overall symptoms of schizophrenia, but firm conclusions are difficult to make due to very low-quality evidence. Data and information are scarce, poorly reported, and probably biased in favour of risperidone, with about half of the included trials developed by drug companies. The article raises concerns regarding the serious side effects of risperidone, such as parkinsonism. A 2011 Cochrane review compared risperidone with other atypical antipsychotics such as olanzapine for schizophrenia, concluding it produced a somewhat higher risk of extrapyramidal side effects.

Long-acting injectable formulations of antipsychotic drugs provide improved compliance with therapy and reduce relapse rates relative to oral formulations. The efficacy of risperidone long-acting injection appears to be similar to that of long-acting injectable forms of first-generation antipsychotics.

=== Bipolar disorder ===
Second-generation antipsychotics, including risperidone, are effective in the treatment of manic symptoms in acute manic or mixed exacerbations of bipolar disorder. In children and adolescents, risperidone may be more effective than lithium or valproate, but has more metabolic side effects. As maintenance therapy, long-acting injectable risperidone is effective for the prevention of manic episodes but not depressive episodes. The long-acting injectable form of risperidone may be advantageous over long-acting first-generation antipsychotics, as it is better tolerated (fewer extrapyramidal effects) and because long acting injectable formulations of first-generation antipsychotics may increase the risk of depression.

=== Autism ===
Compared to placebo, risperidone treatment reduces certain problematic behaviors in autistic children, including aggression toward others, self-injury, challenging behavior, and rapid mood changes. The evidence for its efficacy appears to be greater than that for alternative pharmacological treatments. The risk of rapid weight gain is an important consideration when prescribing it. Some authors recommend limiting the use of risperidone and aripiprazole to those with the most challenging behavioral disturbances to minimize the risk of drug-induced adverse effects. Evidence for the efficacy of risperidone in autistic adolescents and young adults is less persuasive.

=== Dementia ===
While antipsychotic medications such as risperidone have a slight benefit in people with dementia, they have been linked to a higher incidence of death and stroke. Because of this increased risk of death, treatment of dementia-related psychosis with risperidone is not FDA-approved and carries a black box warning. However, many other jurisdictions regularly use it to control severe aggression and psychosis in those with dementia when other non-pharmacological interventions have failed and their pharmaceutical regulators have approved its use in this population.

=== Other uses ===
Risperidone has demonstrated clinical benefit as an augmentation agent in the management of (unipolar) non-psychotic treatment-resistant depression alongside antidepressant treatment. Atypical antipsychotics, such as risperidone, are among the most common augments for antidepressant therapy. Such usage occurs off-label in most jurisdictions and the risk of adverse effects (e.g., weight gain, movement disorders) must be carefully weighed against the clinical benefit.

Risperidone has shown promise in treating therapy-resistant obsessive–compulsive disorder, when serotonin reuptake inhibitors alone are not sufficient.

Risperidone has proven to be effective in treatment of aggression associated with attention deficit hyperactivity disorder (ADHD), or with another mental condition.

Risperidone has not demonstrated a benefit in the treatment of eating disorders or personality disorders, except for limited evidence in schizotypal personality disorder.

=== Available forms ===
Available forms of risperidone include tablet, orally dissolving tablet, oral solution, and powder and solvent for injection.

== Adverse effects ==
Common side effects include movement problems, sleepiness, dizziness, trouble seeing, constipation, and increased weight. About 9 to 20% of people gained more than 7% of the baseline weight depending on the dose. Serious side effects may include the potentially permanent movement disorder tardive dyskinesia, as well as neuroleptic malignant syndrome, an increased risk of suicide, and high blood sugar levels. In older people with psychosis as a result of dementia, it may increase the risk of death.

While atypical antipsychotics appear to have a lower rate of movement problems as compared to typical antipsychotics, risperidone has a high risk of movement problems among the atypicals. Atypical antipsychotics, however, are associated with a greater amount of weight gain and other metabolic side effects.

=== Discontinuation ===
The British National Formulary recommends a gradual withdrawal when discontinuing antipsychotic treatment to avoid acute withdrawal syndrome or rapid relapse.

In 2021, news reports described the death of a 24‑year‑old California woman, Casandra "Casi" Pastora from Chino Hills, who developed severe rebound psychosis after abruptly discontinuing risperidone and died following a confrontation with police and detention at the West Valley Detention Center in Rancho Cucamonga. Her father's attorney, Ed Lyman, stated: "I think it speaks for itself they [the San Bernardino County Sheriff's Department] knew she [Pastora] was mentally ill. They knew she was pregnant. They knew she was withdrawing from her medication and had medical needs right then and there. They could have taken her to a hospital, but they immediately detained her. In that period, she lost her baby and she lost her life."

=== Dementia ===
Older people with dementia-related psychosis are at a higher risk of death.

== Interactions ==
- Carbamazepine and other enzyme inducers may reduce plasma levels of risperidone. If a person is taking both carbamazepine and risperidone, the dose of risperidone will likely need to be increased. The new dose should not be more than twice the patient's original dose.
- CYP2D6 inhibitors, such as the SSRI medications fluoxetine and paroxetine, may increase plasma levels of risperidone.
- Since risperidone can cause hypotension, its use should be monitored closely when a patient is also taking antihypertensive medicines to avoid severe low blood pressure.
- Risperidone and its metabolite paliperidone are reduced in efficacy by P-glycoprotein inducers such as St John's wort.
- Risperidone has been found to dose-dependently block the effects of serotonergic psychedelics like psilocybin and lysergic acid diethylamide (LSD).

== Pharmacology ==
=== Pharmacodynamics ===
Risperidone
Site	K_{i} (nM)	
5-HT_{1A}	423	Antagonist
5-HT_{1B}	14.9	Antagonist
5-HT_{1D}	84.6	Antagonist
5-HT_{2A}	0.17	Inverse agonist
5-HT_{2B}	29–61.9	Inverse agonist
5-HT_{2C}	12.0	Inverse agonist
5-HT_{5A}	206	Antagonist
5-HT_{6}	2060	Antagonist
5-HT_{7}	6.60	Irreversible antagonist
α_{1A}	5.0	Antagonist
α_{1B}	9.0	Antagonist
α_{2A}	16.5	Antagonist
α_{2B}	108	Antagonist
α_{2C}	1.30	Antagonist
D_{1}	244	Antagonist
D_{2}	3.57	Antagonist
D_{2S}	4.73	Antagonist
D_{2L}	4.16	Inverse agonist
D_{3}	3.6	Inverse agonist
D_{4}	4.66	Antagonist
D_{5}	290	Antagonist
H_{1}	20.1	Inverse agonist
H_{2}	120	Inverse agonist
mACh	10000+	Negligible

Risperidone has been classified as a "qualitatively atypical" antipsychotic agent with a relatively low incidence of extrapyramidal side effects (when given at low doses) that has more pronounced serotonin antagonism than dopamine antagonism. Risperidone contains the functional groups of benzisoxazole and piperidine as part of its molecular structure. Although not a butyrophenone, it was developed with the structures of benperidol and ketanserin as a basis. It has actions at several 5-HT (serotonin) receptor subtypes. These are 5-HT_{2C}, linked to weight gain, and 5-HT_{2A}, linked to its antipsychotic action and relief of some of the extrapyramidal side effects experienced with typical antipsychotics.

It has been found that D-amino acid oxidase, the enzyme that catalyses the breakdown of D-amino acids (e.g. D-alanine and D-serine — the neurotransmitters) is inhibited by risperidone.

Risperidone acts on the following receptors:

Dopamine receptors: This drug is an antagonist of the D_{1} (D_{1}, and D_{5}) as well as the D_{2} (D_{2}, D_{3} and D_{4}) family receptors, with 70-fold selectivity for the D_{2} family. It has "tight binding" properties, which means it has a long half-life. Like other antipsychotics, risperidone blocks the mesolimbic pathway, the prefrontal cortex limbic pathway, and the tuberoinfundibular pathway in the central nervous system. Risperidone may induce extrapyramidal side effects, akathisia and tremors, which is associated with diminished dopaminergic activity in the striatum. It can also cause sexual side effects, galactorrhoea, infertility, gynecomastia, and, with chronic use, reduced bone mineral density leading to breaks, all of which are associated with increased prolactin secretion.

Alpha α_{1} adrenergic receptors: This action accounts for the orthostatic hypotensive effects and perhaps some of the sedating effects of risperidone.

Alpha α_{2} adrenergic receptors: Risperidone's action at these receptors may cause greater positive, negative, affective, and cognitive symptom control.

Histamine H_{1} receptors: effects on these receptors account for its sedation and reduction in vigilance. This may also lead to drowsiness and weight gain.

5-HT2A receptor: Risperidone’s atypicality is relatively strong in terms of its binding preference for 5-HT2A receptors over dopamine D2 receptors. However, clozapine is generally considered stronger in this regard. Clozapine differs in that it has lower overall receptor affinity compared to some other atypical antipsychotics, but still maintains an approximate 4-fold higher affinity for 5-HT2A receptors relative to D2 receptors.

Among three atypical antipsychotics often noted for significant 5-HT2A receptor blockade (risperidone, olanzapine, and clozapine), risperidone shows the highest degree of receptor occupancy in a dose-dependent comparison. At approximately 20 mg olanzapine and 6 mg risperidone, reported receptor occupancies are around 93–95%, respectively. Clozapine ranks third when compared using chlorpromazine equivalents.

Voltage-gated sodium channels: Because it accumulates in synaptic vesicles, Risperidone inhibits voltage-gated sodium channels at clinically used concentrations.

=== Pharmacokinetics ===
Risperidone undergoes hepatic metabolism and renal excretion. Lower doses are recommended for patients with severe liver and kidney disease. The active metabolite of risperidone, paliperidone, is also used as an antipsychotic.

Pharmacokinetics of long-acting injectable antipsychotics
Medication	Brand name	Class	Vehicle	Dosage	T_{max}	t_{1/2} single	t_{1/2} multiple	logP^{c}	Ref
Aripiprazole lauroxil	Aristada	Atypical	Water^{a}	441–1064 mg/4–8 weeks	24–35 days	?	54–57 days	7.9–10.0	
Aripiprazole monohydrate	Abilify Maintena	Atypical	Water^{a}	300–400 mg/4 weeks	7 days	?	30–47 days	4.9–5.2	
Bromperidol decanoate	Impromen Decanoas	Typical	Sesame oil	40–300 mg/4 weeks	3–9 days	?	21–25 days	7.9	
Clopentixol decanoate	Sordinol Depot	Typical	Viscoleo^{b}	50–600 mg/1–4 weeks	4–7 days	?	19 days	9.0	
Flupentixol decanoate	Depixol	Typical	Viscoleo^{b}	10–200 mg/2–4 weeks	4–10 days	8 days	17 days	7.2–9.2	
Fluphenazine decanoate	Prolixin Decanoate	Typical	Sesame oil	12.5–100 mg/2–5 weeks	1–2 days	1–10 days	14–100 days	7.2–9.0	
Fluphenazine enanthate	Prolixin Enanthate	Typical	Sesame oil	12.5–100 mg/1–4 weeks	2–3 days	4 days	?	6.4–7.4	
Fluspirilene	Imap, Redeptin	Typical	Water^{a}	2–12 mg/1 week	1–8 days	7 days	?	5.2–5.8	
Haloperidol decanoate	Haldol Decanoate	Typical	Sesame oil	20–400 mg/2–4 weeks	3–9 days	18–21 days		7.2–7.9	
Olanzapine pamoate	Zyprexa Relprevv	Atypical	Water^{a}	150–405 mg/2–4 weeks	7 days	?	30 days	–	
Oxyprothepin decanoate	Meclopin	Typical	?	?	?	?	?	8.5–8.7	
Paliperidone palmitate	Invega Sustenna	Atypical	Water^{a}	39–819 mg/4–12 weeks	13–33 days	25–139 days	?	8.1–10.1	
Perphenazine decanoate	Trilafon Dekanoat	Typical	Sesame oil	50–200 mg/2–4 weeks	?	?	27 days	8.9	
Perphenazine enanthate	Trilafon Enanthate	Typical	Sesame oil	25–200 mg/2 weeks	2–3 days	?	4–7 days	6.4–7.2	
Pipotiazine palmitate	Piportil Longum	Typical	Viscoleo^{b}	25–400 mg/4 weeks	9–10 days	?	14–21 days	8.5–11.6	
Pipotiazine undecylenate	Piportil Medium	Typical	Sesame oil	100–200 mg/2 weeks	?	?	?	8.4	
Risperidone	Risperdal Consta	Atypical	Microspheres	12.5–75 mg/2 weeks	21 days	?	3–6 days	–	
Zuclopentixol acetate	Clopixol Acuphase	Typical	Viscoleo^{b}	50–200 mg/1–3 days	1–2 days	1–2 days		4.7–4.9	
Zuclopentixol decanoate	Clopixol Depot	Typical	Viscoleo^{b}	50–800 mg/2–4 weeks	4–9 days	?	11–21 days	7.5–9.0	
Note: All by intramuscular injection. Footnotes: ^{a} = Microcrystalline or nanocrystalline aqueous suspension. ^{b} = Low-viscosity vegetable oil (specifically fractionated coconut oil with medium-chain triglycerides). ^{c} = Predicted, from PubChem and DrugBank. Sources: Main: See template.

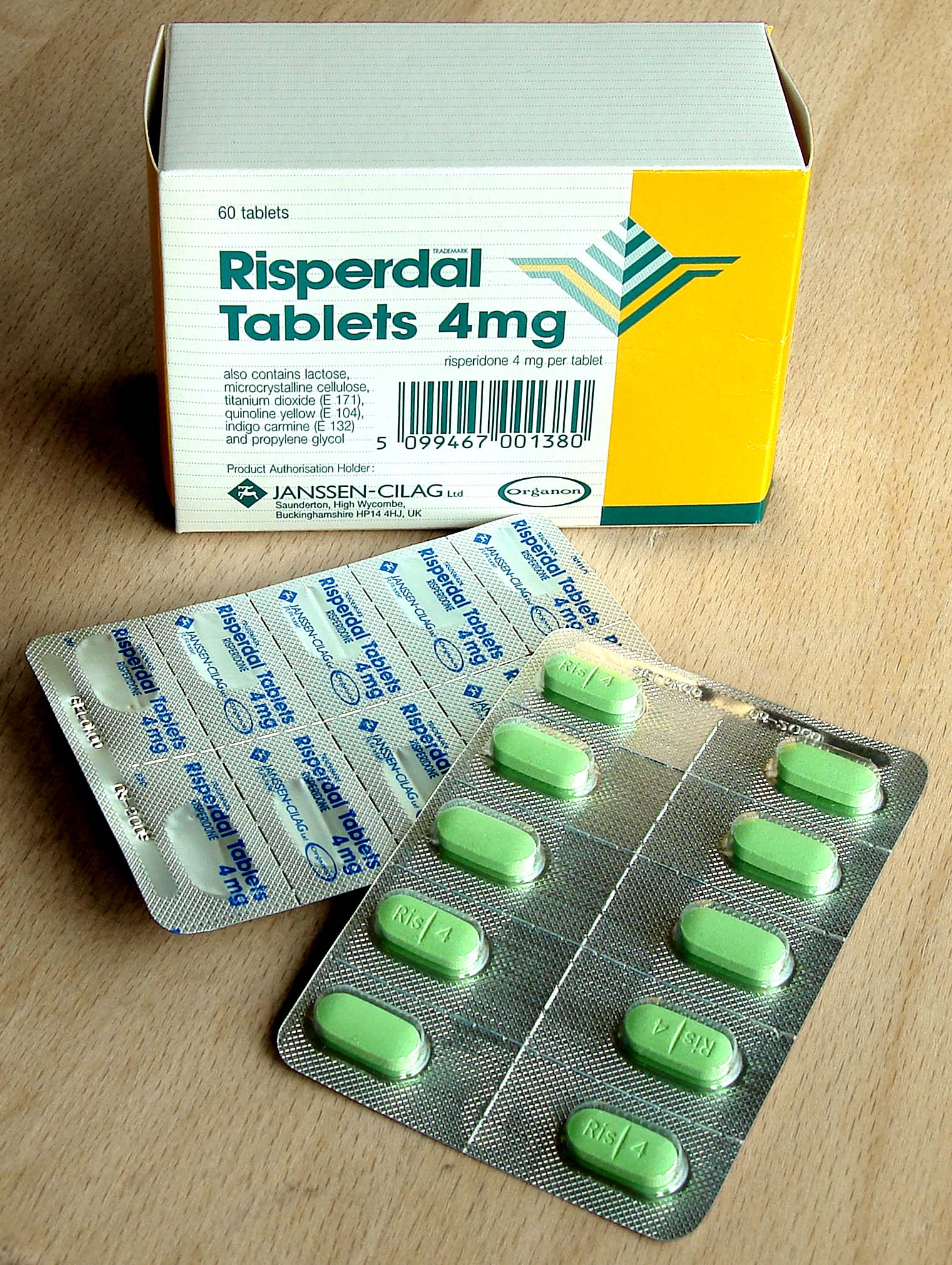
Risperdal (risperidone) 4 mg tablets (UK)

== Society and culture ==
=== Legal status ===
Risperidone was approved by the United States Food and Drug Administration (FDA) in 1993 for the treatment of schizophrenia. In 2003, the FDA approved risperidone for the short-term treatment of the mixed and manic states associated with bipolar disorder. In 2006, the FDA approved risperidone for the treatment of irritability in autistic children and adolescents. The FDA's decision was based in part on a study of autistic people with severe and enduring problems of violent meltdowns, aggression, and self-injury; risperidone is not recommended for autistic people with mild aggression and explosive behavior without an enduring pattern. On 22 August 2007, risperidone was approved as the only drug agent available for the treatment of schizophrenia in youths, ages 13–17; it was also approved that same day for the treatment of bipolar disorder in youths, ages 10–17, joining lithium.

In December 2021, the Committee for Medicinal Products for Human Use of the European Medicines Agency recommended market authorization for Okedi, a long-acting depot injection of risperidone. Okedi was approved for the treatment of schizophrenia in adults for whom the tolerability and effectiveness of risperidone had already been established using an oral formulation. Long-acting depot injectable risperidone was approved for medical use in the European Union in February 2022.

=== Lawsuits ===
In April 2012, Johnson & Johnson (J&J) and its subsidiary Janssen Pharmaceuticals Inc. were fined $1.2 billion for downplaying multiple risks associated with risperidone. The verdict was later reversed by the Arkansas state supreme court.

In August 2012, J&J agreed to pay $181 million to 36 US states to settle claims that it had promoted risperidone and paliperidone for off-label uses including for dementia, anger management, and anxiety.

In November 2013, J&J was fined $2.2 billion for illegally marketing risperidone for use in people with dementia and paying kickbacks to prescribing physicians and nursing home pharmacies.

In 2015, Steven Brill wrote an investigative journalism piece about J&J in The Huffington Post focused on J&J's marketing of risperidone.

J&J has faced numerous civil lawsuits on behalf of children who were prescribed risperidone who grew breasts (a condition called gynecomastia); as of July 2016 there were about 1,500 cases in Pennsylvania state court in Philadelphia, and there had been a February 2015 verdict against J&J with $2.5 million awarded to a man from Alabama, a $1.75 million verdict against J&J that November, and in 2016 a $70 million verdict against J&J. In October 2019, a jury ordered J&J to pay $8 billion in punitive damages to a Pennsylvania man who had grown breasts during adolescence. This verdict amount chosen by the jury was reduced more than 1,000-fold by a judge in January 2020, with the new punitive damages being $6.8 million. A legal scholar commented that punitive damages which exceed the compensatory damages by a factor of 10 or more in cases of this type are usually found to be legally invalid.

=== Brand names ===
Janssen's patent on risperidone expired in December 2003, opening the market for cheaper generic versions from other companies, and Janssen's exclusive marketing rights expired in June 2004 (the result of a pediatric extension). It is available under many brand names worldwide.

Risperidone is available as a tablet, an oral solution, and an ampule, which is a depot injection.

Brand names include Risperdal, Risperdal Consta, Risperdal M-Tab, Risperdal Quicklets, Risperlet, Okedi, and Perseris.
