= Cmax (pharmacology) =

Peak concentration of a drug in a body compartment

C_{max} is the maximum (or peak) serum concentration that a drug achieves in a specified compartment or test area of the body after the drug has been administered and before the administration of a second dose. It is a standard measurement in pharmacokinetics.

== Description ==
C_{max} is the opposite of C_{min}, which is the minimum (or trough) concentration that a drug achieves after dosing. The related pharmacokinetic parameter t_{max} is the time at which the C_{max} is observed.

After an intravenous administration, C_{max} and t_{max} are closely dependent on the experimental protocol, since the concentrations are always decreasing after the dose. But after oral administration, C_{max} and t_{max} are dependent on the extent, and the rate of drug absorption and the disposition profile of the drug. They could be used to characterize the properties of different formulations in the same subject.

Short term drug side effects are most likely to occur at or near the C_{max}, whereas the therapeutic effect of drug with sustained duration of action usually occurs at concentrations slightly above the C_{min}.

The C_{max} is often measured in an effort to show bioequivalence (BE) between a generic and innovator drug product. According to the FDA, drug quality bioavailability (BA) and BE rely on pharmacokinetic measurements such as AUC and C_{max} that are reflective of systemic exposure.

== See also ==
- C_{avg} (pharmacology)
- Area under the curve (pharmacokinetics)
