= List of antipsychotics =

Following is a list of antipsychotics, sorted by class.

== Antipsychotics ==
Antipsychotics by class
Generic name	Brand names	Chemical class	ATC code
Typical antipsychotics
Acepromazine	Atravet, Acezine	phenothiazine	N05AA04
Acetophenazine	Tindal	phenothiazine	N05AB07
Benperidol	Frenactyl	butyrophenone	N05AD07
Bromperidol	Bromidol, Bromodol	butyrophenone	N05AD06
Butaperazine	Repoise, Tyrylen	phenothiazine	N05AB09
Carfenazine		phenothiazine	
Chlorproethazine		phenothiazine	N05AA07
Chlorpromazine	Largactil, Thorazine	phenothiazine	N05AA01
Chlorprothixene	Cloxan, Taractan, Truxal	thioxanthene	N05AF03
Clopenthixol	Sordinol	thioxanthene	N05AF02
Cyamemazine	Tercian	phenothiazine	N05AA06
Dixyrazine	Esucos	phenothiazine	N05AB01
Droperidol	Droleptan, Dridol, Inapsine, Xomolix, Innovar (+ Fentanyl)	phenylbutylamine (butyrophenone)	N05AD08
Fluanisone		butyrophenone	N05AD09
Flupentixol	Depixol, Fluanxol	thioxanthene	N05AF01
Fluphenazine	Prolixin, Modecate	phenothiazine	N05AB02
Fluspirilene	Redeptin, Imap	diphenylbutylpiperidine	N05AG01
Haloperidol	Haldol	phenyl-piperidinyl-butyrophenone	N05AD01
Levomepromazine	Nosinan, Nozinan, Levoprome	phenothiazine	N05AA02
Lenperone	Elanone-V	butyrophenone	
Mesoridazine	Serentil	phenothiazine	N05AC03
Metitepine		tricyclic dibenzodiazepine	
Molindone	Moban	indole derivative	N05AE02
Moperone	Luvatren	butyrophenone	N05AD04
Oxypertine	Equipertine, Forit, Integrin, Lanturil, Lotawin, Opertil	phenylpiperazine	N05AE01
Oxyprothepine	Meclopin	dibenzothiepine	
Penfluridol	Semap, Micefal, Longoperidol	diphenylbutylpiperidine	N05AG03
Perazine	Taxilan	phenothiazine	N05AB10
Periciazine	Neuleptil, Neulactil	phenothiazine	N05AC01
Perphenazine	Trilafon	phenothiazine	N05AB03
Pimozide	Orap	diphenylbutylpiperidine	N05AG02
Pipamperone	Dipiperon, Dipiperal, Piperonil, Piperonyl, Propitan	butyrophenone	N05AD05
Piperacetazine	Quide	phenothiazine	
Pipotiazine	Piportil	phenothiazine	N05AC04
Prochlorperazine	Compazine, Stemzine, Buccastem, Stemetil, Phenotil	phenothiazine	N05AB04
Promazine	Sparine	phenothiazine	N05AA03
Prothipendyl		phenothiazines	N05AX07
Spiperone	Spiroperidol, Spiropitan	butyrophenone	
Sulforidazine	Imagotan, Psychoson, Inofal	phenothiazine ||	
Sulpiride	Sulpirid, Eglonyl	benzenesulfonamide (benzamide)	N05AL01
Sultopride	Barnetil, Barnotil, Topral	benzamide	N05AL02
Tiapride	Equilium, Tiapridal	benzamide	N05AL03
Thiopropazate	Artalan, Dartal, Dartalan, Dartan	phenothiazine	N05AB05
Thioproperazine	Majeptil	phenothiazine	N05AB08
Thioridazine	Mellaril, Melleril	phenothiazine	N05AC02
Thiothixene	Navane	thioxanthene	N05AF04
Timiperone		butyrophenone	
Trifluoperazine	Stelazine	phenothiazine	N05AB06
Trifluperidol		butyrophenone	N05AD02
Triflupromazine	Vesprin	phenothiazine	N05AA05
Zuclopenthixol	Clopixol	thioxanthene	N05AF05
Atypical antipsychotics
Amisulpride	Amazeo, Amipride, Amival, Solian, Soltus, Sulpitac, Sulprix	substituted benzamides	N05AL05
Aripiprazole	Abilify	quinolone	N05AX12
Asenapine	Saphris	dibenzo-oxepino pyrrole	N05AH05
Blonanserin	Lonasen		
Brexpiprazole	Rexulti	quinolone	N05AX16
Cariprazine	Vraylar		N05AX15
Carpipramine	Prazinil, Defekton		
Clocapramine	Clofekton, Padrasen	imidobenzyl	
Clorotepine	Clotepin, Clopiben	tricyclic dibenzodiazepine	
Clotiapine	Entumine		N05AH06
Clozapine	Clozaril	tricyclic dibenzodiazepine	N05AH02
Iloperidone	Fanapt	benzisoxazole	N05AX14
Levosulpiride		benzamide	N05AL07
Loxapine	Loxapac, Loxitane, Adasuve	dibenzoxazepine	N05AH01
Lumateperone	Caplyta	butyrophenone	
Lurasidone	Latuda	n-arylpiperazine (piperazine)	N05AE05
Melperone	Bunil, Buronil, Eunerpan	butyrophenone	N05AD03
Mosapramine	Cremin		N05AX10
Nemonapride	Emilace	benzamide	
Olanzapine	Zyprexa, Ozace, Lanzek, Zypadhera	thienobenzodiazepine	N05AH03
Paliperidone	Invega	pyridopyrimidine	N05AX13
Perospirone	Lullan	azapirone	
Quetiapine	Seroquel	dibenzothiazepine	N05AH04
Remoxipride	Roxiam	salicylamide	N05AL04
Reserpine	Raudixin, Serpalan, Serpasil	yohimbine alkaloid	C02AA02
Risperidone	Risperdal, Zepidone	pyridopyrimidine	N05AX08
Sertindole	Serdolect	phenylindole	N05AE03
Veralipride	Agreal, Agradil	benzamide	N05AL06
Xanomeline/trospium chloride	Cobenfy, KarXT, BMS-986510	Central Muscarinic Agonist/Peripheral Selective muscarinic antagonist	N05AX50
Ziprasidone	Geodon, Zeldox	n-arylpiperazine (piperazine)	N05AE04
Zotepine	Nipolept	tricyclic dibenzodiazepine	N05AX11
Under development
Perphenazine gamma-aminobutyrate	BL-1020		
Pimavanserin	ACP-103		
	F-15063		
	ITI-007	tetracyclic quinoxaline	
	Lu AF35700		
	RP5063		
Stepholidine		berberine	
Development abandoned
Amperozide		Diphenylbutylpiperazine	QN05AX90
Bifeprunox	DU-127,090	biphenyl derivative	
Butaclamol	AY-23,028		
Ciclindole	WIN-27,147-2		
Clopimozide	R-29,764	diphenylbutylpiperidine	
Elopiprazole	DU-29894	phenylpiperazine	
Flucindole			
Fluotracen	SKF-28,175		
Fluperlapine	NB 106-689	tricyclic	
Gevotroline	WY-47,384	tricyclic dibenzodiazepine	
Naranol	W-5494A		
N-Desmethylclozapine	ACP-104		
Ocaperidone	R 79598	benzisoxazole	
Piquindone	Ro 22-1319	tricyclic	
Pomaglumetad	LY2140023		
Tiospirone	BMY-13,859	azapirone	
Umespirone	KC-9172	azapirone	
Vabicaserin	SCA-136		
Volinanserin	MDL-100,907		
Zetidoline	DL 308-IT		
Zicronapine	Lu 31-130		
Generic Name	Brand Names	Chemical class	ATC code

=== Antipsychotic esters ===
==== Typical antipsychotics ====
- Bromperidol decanoate
- Clopenthixol decanoate
- Flupentixol decanoate
- Flupentixol palmitate
- Fluphenazine decanoate
- Fluphenazine enanthate
- Haloperidol decanoate
- Oxyprothepin decanoate
- Perphenazine decanoate
- Perphenazine enanthate
- Pipotiazine palmitate
- Pipotiazine undecylenate
- Zuclopenthixol acetate
- Zuclopenthixol decanoate

==== Atypical antipsychotics ====
- Aripiprazole lauroxil
- Paliperidone palmitate

== See also ==
- ATC code N05A
- List of investigational antipsychotics
