= Perazine =

Typical antipsychotic medication

Clinical data
- AHFS/Drugs.com: International Drug Names
- ATC code: N05AB10 (WHO)

Identifiers
- IUPAC name: 10-[3-(4-methylpiperazin-1-yl)propyl]-10H-phenothiazine
- CAS Number: 84-97-9
- PubChem CID: 4744
- DrugBank: DB12710
- ChemSpider: 4582
- UNII: 8915147A2B
- KEGG: C16903
- ChEBI: CHEBI:59118
- ChEMBL: ChEMBL1697766
- CompTox Dashboard (EPA): DTXSID6048628
- ECHA InfoCard: 100.001.435

Chemical and physical data
- Formula: C_{20}H_{25}N_{3}S
- Molar mass: 339.50 g·mol^{−1}
- 3D model (JSmol): Interactive image
- SMILES: CN1CCN(CC1)CCCN2C3=CC=CC=C3SC4=CC=CC=C42
- InChI: InChI=1S/C20H25N3S/c1-21-13-15-22(16-14-21)11-6-12-23-17-7-2-4-9-19(17)24-20-10-5-3-8-18(20)23/h2-5,7-10H,6,11-16H2,1H3; Key:WEYVCQFUGFRXOM-UHFFFAOYSA-N

Perazine (Taxilan) is a moderate-potency typical antipsychotic of the phenothiazine class. It is quite similar to chlorpromazine, and acts as a dopamine antagonist. It was very popular in West-Germany. A 2014 systematic review compared it with other antipsychotic drugs:

Perazine versus other antipsychotic drugs for schizophrenia
Summary
The number, size and reporting of randomized controlled perazine trials are insufficient to present firm conclusions about the properties of this antipsychotic. It is possible that perazine is associated with a similar risk of extrapyramidal side effects as some atypical antipsychotics but this is based on few comparisons of limited power.

Outcome	Findings in words	Findings in numbers	Quality of evidence
Global state
No better or deterioration Follow-up: average 5 weeks	Perazine may decrease the chance of experiencing this outcome. These findings are based on data of low quality.	RR 0.43 (0.23 to 0.81)	Low
Mental state
Less than 30% BPRS reduction Follow-up: mean 5 weeks	The average overall mental state score in the perazine group was lower than for those given other antipsychotic drugs but the difference between the groups was not clear. These findings are based on data of low quality.	RR 0.82 (0.61 to 1.09)	Low
Adverse effects
Needing antiparkinson medication Follow-up: average 5 weeks	Perazine might increase the risk of experiencing this outcome but at present it is not possible to be confident about the difference between perazine and other antipsychotic drugs. Data supporting this finding are very limited.	RR 4.5 (1.04 to 19.45)	Very low
Leaving the study early - due to adverse events Follow-up: average 4 weeks	There was not a clear difference between perazine and the other antipsychotic drugs for this general outcome reflecting overall adverse event 'load'. These findings are based on data of low quality.	0.87 (0.4 to 1.9)	Low
Acceptability of treatment
Leaving the studies early - any reason Follow-up: 5 weeks	Perazine and the comparison antipsychotic drugs were equally tolerated. These findings are based on data of low quality.	RR 0.62 (0.35 to 1.1)	Low
	No study reported any data on outcomes such as quality of life or information relating to satisfaction with care.		

== Synthesis ==
Perazine synthesis: Patents: Alternate source:

Phenothiazine-10-propionitrile [1698-80-2] (1) is treated with a mixture of acid and alcohol giving Methyl phenothiazinepropionate, CID:368244 (2). Heating with 1-methylpiperazine (3) gives the amide [91508-47-3] (4). Reduction of this last by means of diborane yields Perazine (5).

== See also ==
- Carphenazine
- Dixyrazine
- Methdilazine
- Pipamazine
