= C11H16N2O3 =

C_{11}H_{16}N_{2}O_{3} may refer to:

- Butalbital
- Enallylpropymal
- Nifenalol
- Talbutal
- Vinbarbital
- Vinylbital
