= C14H18N2O3 =

The molecular formula C_{14}H_{18}N_{2}O_{3} (molar mass: 262.30 g/mol, exact mass: 262.1317 u) may refer to:

- Methohexital, or methohexitone
- Reposal
