= Hexapropymate =

Chemical compound

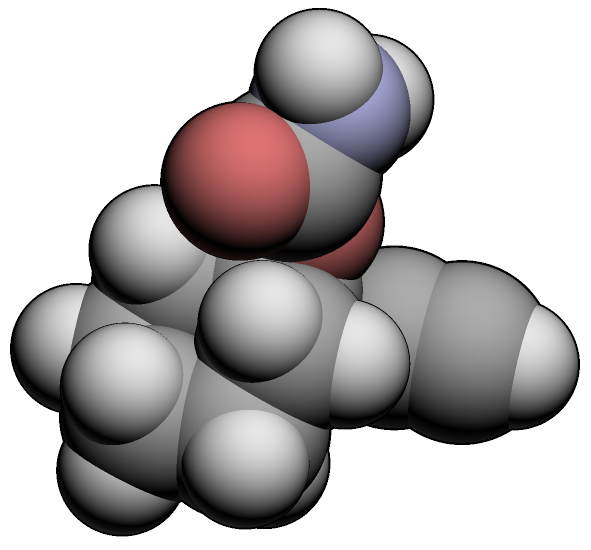

Clinical data
- ATC code: N05CM10 (WHO)

Identifiers
- IUPAC name: 1-prop-2-yn-1-ylcyclohexyl carbamate
- CAS Number: 358-52-1
- PubChem CID: 9661
- ChemSpider: 9280
- UNII: 0J9RN2PRJ7
- ChEMBL: ChEMBL2104292
- CompTox Dashboard (EPA): DTXSID00189329
- ECHA InfoCard: 100.006.018

Chemical and physical data
- Formula: C_{10}H_{15}NO_{2}
- Molar mass: 181.235 g·mol^{−1}
- 3D model (JSmol): Interactive image
- SMILES: O=C(OC1(CCCCC1)CC#C)N
- InChI: InChI=1S/C10H15NO2/c1-2-6-10(13-9(11)12)7-4-3-5-8-10/h1H,3-8H2,(H2,11,12); Key:MIRHIEAGDGUXKL-UHFFFAOYSA-N

Hexapropymate (brand names Modirax, Merinax, Lunamin) is a hypnotic/sedative. It has effects similar to those of barbiturates and was used in the 1970s-1980s in the treatment of insomnia before being replaced with newer drugs with improved safety profiles.
