= ATC code N05 =

Pharmaceutical drug classification

ATC code N05 Psycholeptics is a therapeutic subgroup of the Anatomical Therapeutic Chemical Classification System, a system of alphanumeric codes developed by the World Health Organization (WHO) for the classification of drugs and other medical products. Subgroup N05 is part of the anatomical group N Nervous system.

Codes for veterinary use (ATCvet codes) can be created by placing the letter Q in front of the human ATC code: for example, QN05. ATCvet codes without corresponding human ATC codes are cited with the leading Q in the following list.
National versions of the ATC classification may include additional codes not present in this list, which follows the WHO version.

== N05A Antipsychotics ==
=== N05AA Phenothiazines with aliphatic side-chain ===
N05AA01 Chlorpromazine
N05AA02 Levomepromazine
N05AA03 Promazine
N05AA04 Acepromazine
N05AA05 Triflupromazine
N05AA06 Cyamemazine
N05AA07 Chlorproethazine

=== N05AB Phenothiazines with piperazine structure ===
N05AB01 Dixyrazine
N05AB02 Fluphenazine
N05AB03 Perphenazine
N05AB04 Prochlorperazine
N05AB05 Thiopropazate
N05AB06 Trifluoperazine
N05AB07 Acetophenazine
N05AB08 Thioproperazine
N05AB09 Butaperazine
N05AB10 Perazine
N05AB13 Metofenazate

=== N05AC Phenothiazines with piperidine structure ===
N05AC01 Periciazine
N05AC02 Thioridazine
N05AC03 Mesoridazine
N05AC04 Pipotiazine

=== N05AD Butyrophenone derivatives ===
N05AD01 Haloperidol
N05AD02 Trifluperidol
N05AD03 Melperone
N05AD04 Moperone
N05AD05 Pipamperone
N05AD06 Bromperidol
N05AD07 Benperidol
N05AD08 Droperidol
N05AD09 Fluanisone
N05AD10 Lumateperone

=== N05AE Indole derivatives ===
N05AE01 Oxypertine
N05AE02 Molindone
N05AE03 Sertindole
N05AE04 Ziprasidone
N05AE05 Lurasidone

=== N05AF Thioxanthene derivatives ===
N05AF01 Flupentixol
N05AF02 Clopenthixol
N05AF03 Chlorprothixene
N05AF04 Tiotixene
N05AF05 Zuclopenthixol

=== N05AG Diphenylbutylpiperidine derivatives ===
N05AG01 Fluspirilene
N05AG02 Pimozide
N05AG03 Penfluridol

=== N05AH Diazepines, oxazepines, thiazepines and oxepines ===
N05AH01 Loxapine
N05AH02 Clozapine
N05AH03 Olanzapine
N05AH04 Quetiapine
N05AH05 Asenapine
N05AH06 Clotiapine
N05AH53 Olanzapine and samidorphan

=== N05AL Benzamides ===
N05AL01 Sulpiride
N05AL02 Sultopride
N05AL03 Tiapride
N05AL04 Remoxipride
N05AL05 Amisulpride
N05AL06 Veralipride
N05AL07 Levosulpiride

=== N05AN Lithium ===
N05AN01 Lithium

=== N05AX Other antipsychotics ===
N05AX07 Prothipendyl
N05AX08 Risperidone
N05AX10 Mosapramine
N05AX11 Zotepine
N05AX12 Aripiprazole
N05AX13 Paliperidone
N05AX14 Iloperidone
N05AX15 Cariprazine
N05AX16 Brexpiprazole
N05AX17 Pimavanserin
N05AX25 Reserpine

== N05B Anxiolytics ==
=== N05BA Benzodiazepine derivatives ===
N05BA01 Diazepam
N05BA02 Chlordiazepoxide
N05BA03 Medazepam
N05BA04 Oxazepam
N05BA05 Dipotassium clorazepate
N05BA06 Lorazepam
N05BA07 Adinazolam
N05BA08 Bromazepam
N05BA09 Clobazam
N05BA10 Ketazolam
N05BA11 Prazepam
N05BA12 Alprazolam
N05BA13 Halazepam
N05BA14 Pinazepam
N05BA15 Camazepam
N05BA16 Nordazepam
N05BA17 Fludiazepam
N05BA18 Ethyl loflazepate
N05BA19 Etizolam
N05BA21 Clotiazepam
N05BA22 Cloxazolam
N05BA23 Tofisopam
N05BA24 Bentazepam
N05BA25 Mexazolam
N05BA26 Oxazolam
N05BA27 Metaclazepam
N05BA56 Lorazepam, combinations

=== N05BB Diphenylmethane derivatives ===
N05BB01 Hydroxyzine
N05BB02 Captodiame
N05BB51 Hydroxyzine, combinations

=== N05BC Carbamates ===
N05BC01 Meprobamate
N05BC03 Emylcamate
N05BC04 Mebutamate
N05BC51 Meprobamate, combinations

=== N05BD Dibenzo-bicyclo-octadiene derivatives ===
N05BD01 Benzoctamine

=== N05BE Azaspirodecanedione derivatives ===
N05BE01 Buspirone

=== N05BP Herbal anxiolytics ===
N05BP02 Kava-kava rootstock
N05BP03 Lavender oil

=== N05BX Other anxiolytics ===
N05BX01 Mephenoxalone
N05BX02 Gedocarnil
N05BX03 Etifoxine
N05BX04 Fabomotizole
N05BX08 Kavain

== N05C Hypnotics and sedatives ==
=== N05CA Barbiturates, plain ===
N05CA01 Pentobarbital
N05CA02 Amobarbital
N05CA03 Butobarbital
N05CA04 Barbital
N05CA05 Aprobarbital
N05CA06 Secobarbital
N05CA07 Talbutal
N05CA08 Vinylbital
N05CA09 Vinbarbital
N05CA10 Cyclobarbital
N05CA11 Heptabarbital
N05CA12 Reposal
N05CA15 Methohexital
N05CA16 Hexobarbital
N05CA19 Thiopental
N05CA20 Ethallobarbital
N05CA21 Allobarbital
N05CA22 Proxibarbal
N05CA23 Crotylbarbital
N05CA24 Phenobarbital
N05CA25 Propallylonal
N05CA26 Bromallylmethylbutylbarbituric acid

=== N05CB Barbiturates, combinations ===
N05CB01 Combinations of barbiturates
N05CB02 Barbiturates in combination with other drugs

=== N05CC Aldehydes and derivatives ===
N05CC01 Chloral hydrate
N05CC02 Chloralodol
N05CC03 Acetylglycinamide chloral hydrate
N05CC04 Dichloralphenazone
N05CC05 Paraldehyde

=== N05CD Benzodiazepine derivatives ===
N05CD01 Flurazepam
N05CD02 Nitrazepam
N05CD03 Flunitrazepam
N05CD04 Estazolam
N05CD05 Triazolam
N05CD06 Lormetazepam
N05CD07 Temazepam
N05CD08 Midazolam
N05CD09 Brotizolam
N05CD10 Quazepam
N05CD11 Loprazolam
N05CD12 Doxefazepam
N05CD13 Cinolazepam
N05CD14 Remimazolam
N05CD15 Nimetazepam

=== N05CE Piperidinedione derivatives ===
N05CE01 Glutethimide
N05CE02 Methyprylon
N05CE03 Pyrithyldione

=== N05CF Benzodiazepine related drugs ===
N05CF01 Zopiclone
N05CF02 Zolpidem
N05CF03 Zaleplon
N05CF04 Eszopiclone

=== N05CH Melatonin receptor agonists ===
N05CH01 Melatonin
N05CH02 Ramelteon
N05CH03 Tasimelteon

=== N05CJ Orexin receptor antagonists ===
N05CJ01 Suvorexant
N05CJ02 Lemborexant
N05CJ03 Daridorexant

=== N05CM Other hypnotics and sedatives ===
N05CM01 Methaqualone
N05CM02 Clomethiazole
N05CM03 Bromisoval
N05CM04 Carbromal
N05CM05 Scopolamine
N05CM06 Propiomazine
N05CM07 Triclofos
N05CM08 Ethchlorvynol
N05CM10 Hexapropymate
N05CM11 Bromides
N05CM12 Apronal
N05CM13 Valnoctamide
N05CM15 Methylpentynol
N05CM16 Niaprazine
N05CM18 Dexmedetomidine
N05CM20 Diphenhydramine
N05CM22 Promethazine
N05CM25 Magnesium aspartate hydrobromide
N05CM26 Magnesium glutamate hydrobromide
N05CM27 Doxylamine

=== N05CP Herbal hypnotics and sedatives ===
N05CP01 Valerian root
N05CP02 Kava-kava rootstock
N05CP03 St. John's wort
N05CP04 Melissa herb
N05CP05 Passionflower herb
N05CP06 Valerian oil
N05CP07 Hops
N05CP30 Combinations
N05CP50 Other herbal hypnotics and sedatives, combinations
N05CP51 Valerian oil, combinations
N05CP52 Kava-kava rootstock, combinations

=== N05CX Hypnotics and sedatives in combination, excl. barbiturates ===
N05CX01 Meprobamate, combinations
N05CX02 Methaqualone, combinations
N05CX03 Methylpentynol, combinations
N05CX04 Clomethiazole, combinations
N05CX05 Emepronium, combinations
N05CX06 Dipiperonylaminoethanol, combinations
N05CX07 Diphenhydramine, combinations
N05CX08 Carbromal, combinations
N05CX09 Bromisoval, combinations
N05CX11 Chloral hydrate, combinations
N05CX13 Promethazine, combinations

== N05H Homeopathic and anthroposophical psycholeptics ==
=== N05HH Homeopathic and anthroposophical hypnotics and sedatives ===
N05HH10 Miscellaneous
N05HH20 Combinations
N05HH30 Combination with other drugs
