= C10H14N2O3 =

The molecular formula C_{10}H_{14}N_{2}O_{3} (molar mass: 210.23 g/mol, exact mass: 210.1004 u) may refer to:

- Aprobarbital
- Clocental
- Crotylbarbital
