= C9H12N2O3 =

The molecular formula C_{9}H_{12}N_{2}O_{3} (molar mass: 196.20 g/mol) may refer to:

- Ethallobarbital, or ethallymal
- 5-Nitro-2-propoxyaniline
