= C13H18N2O3 =

The molecular formula C_{13}H_{18}N_{2}O_{3} (molar mass: 250.294 g/mol) may refer to:

- Heptabarb, or heptabarbital
- Lacosamide
