= C20H24N2OS =

The molecular formula C_{20}H_{24}N_{2}OS (molar mass: 340.48 g/mol, exact mass: 340.1609 u) may refer to:

- Cinanserin
- Lucanthone
- Propiomazine
