= Ethallobarbital =

Chemical compound

Clinical data
- Other names: Aethallymal, Aethylal, Etallobarbital, Go 1067
- Routes of administration: Oral
- ATC code: N05CA20 (WHO)

Legal status
- Legal status: US: Schedule III

Pharmacokinetic data
- Metabolism: Hepatic
- Excretion: Renal

Identifiers
- IUPAC name: 5-ethyl-5-prop-2-enyl-1,3-diazinane-2,4,6-trione
- CAS Number: 2373-84-4
- PubChem CID: 48542
- ChemSpider: 44152
- UNII: 6F1R68CB4I
- CompTox Dashboard (EPA): DTXSID70178407
- ECHA InfoCard: 100.017.412

Chemical and physical data
- Formula: C_{9}H_{12}N_{2}O_{3}
- Molar mass: 196.206 g·mol^{−1}
- 3D model (JSmol): Interactive image
- SMILES: O=C1NC(=O)NC(=O)C1(CC)C\C=C
- InChI: InChI=1S/C9H12N2O3/c1-3-5-9(4-2)6(12)10-8(14)11-7(9)13/h3H,1,4-5H2,2H3,(H2,10,11,12,13,14); Key:QPADNTZLUBYNEN-UHFFFAOYSA-N

Ethallobarbital (brand names Dormin, Dumex, Dormitiv, Dorval), also known as ethallymal and 5-allyl-5-ethylbarbituric acid, is an allyl-substituted barbiturate described as a sedative/hypnotic. It was first synthesized in 1927.

== See also ==
- Allobarbital
