= Metaclazepam =

Chemical compound

Clinical data
- Trade names: Talis
- ATC code: none

Identifiers
- IUPAC name: 7-bromo-5-(2-chlorophenyl)-2-(methoxymethyl)-1-methyl-2,3-dihydro-1,4-benzodiazepine
- CAS Number: 84031-17-4
- PubChem CID: 71272
- ChemSpider: 64398
- UNII: C2N2B1303L
- ChEMBL: ChEMBL1290783
- CompTox Dashboard (EPA): DTXSID40905121

Chemical and physical data
- Formula: C_{18}H_{18}BrClN_{2}O
- Molar mass: 393.71 g·mol^{−1}
- 3D model (JSmol): Interactive image
- SMILES: ClC1=CC=CC=C1C2=NCC(COC)N(C)C3=C2C=C(Br)C=C3
- InChI: InChI=1S/C18H18BrClN2O/c1-22-13(11-23-2)10-21-18(14-5-3-4-6-16(14)20)15-9-12(19)7-8-17(15)22/h3-9,13H,10-11H2,1-2H3; Key:WABYCCJHARSRBH-UHFFFAOYSA-N

Metaclazepam (marketed under the brand name Talis) is a drug which is a benzodiazepine derivative. It is a relatively selective anxiolytic with less sedative or muscle relaxant properties than other benzodiazepines such as diazepam or bromazepam. It has an active metabolite N-desmethylmetaclazepam, which is the main metabolite of metaclazepam. There is no significant difference in metabolism between younger and older individuals.

Metaclazepam is slightly more effective as an anxiolytic than bromazepam, or diazepam, with a 15 mg dose of metaclazepam equivalent to 4 mg of bromazepam. Metaclazepam can interact with alcohol producing additive sedative-hypnotic effects. Fatigue is a common side effect from metaclazepam at high doses. Small amounts of metaclazepam as well as its metabolites enter into human breast milk.

== See also ==
- Benzodiazepine
