= Acetophenazine =

Chemical compound

Clinical data
- MedlinePlus: a600010
- ATC code: N05AB07 (WHO)

Identifiers
- IUPAC name: 1-[10-[3-[4-(2-hydroxyethyl)piperazin-1-yl]propyl]-10H-phenothiazin-2-yl]ethanone
- CAS Number: 2751-68-0
- PubChem CID: 17676
- DrugBank: DB01063
- ChemSpider: 16708
- UNII: 8620H6K4QH
- KEGG: C06807
- ChEBI: CHEBI:2401
- ChEMBL: ChEMBL1085
- CompTox Dashboard (EPA): DTXSID2022547

Chemical and physical data
- Formula: C_{23}H_{29}N_{3}O_{2}S
- Molar mass: 411.56 g·mol^{−1}
- 3D model (JSmol): Interactive image
- SMILES: O=C(c2cc1N(c3c(Sc1cc2)cccc3)CCCN4CCN(CCO)CC4)C
- InChI: InChI=1S/C23H29N3O2S/c1-18(28)19-7-8-23-21(17-19)26(20-5-2-3-6-22(20)29-23)10-4-9-24-11-13-25(14-12-24)15-16-27/h2-3,5-8,17,27H,4,9-16H2,1H3; Key:WNTYBHLDCKXEOT-UHFFFAOYSA-N

Acetophenazine (Tindal) is a typical antipsychotic of the phenothiazine class.

== See also ==
- Typical antipsychotic
- Phenothiazine
