= Butobarbital =

Barbiturate

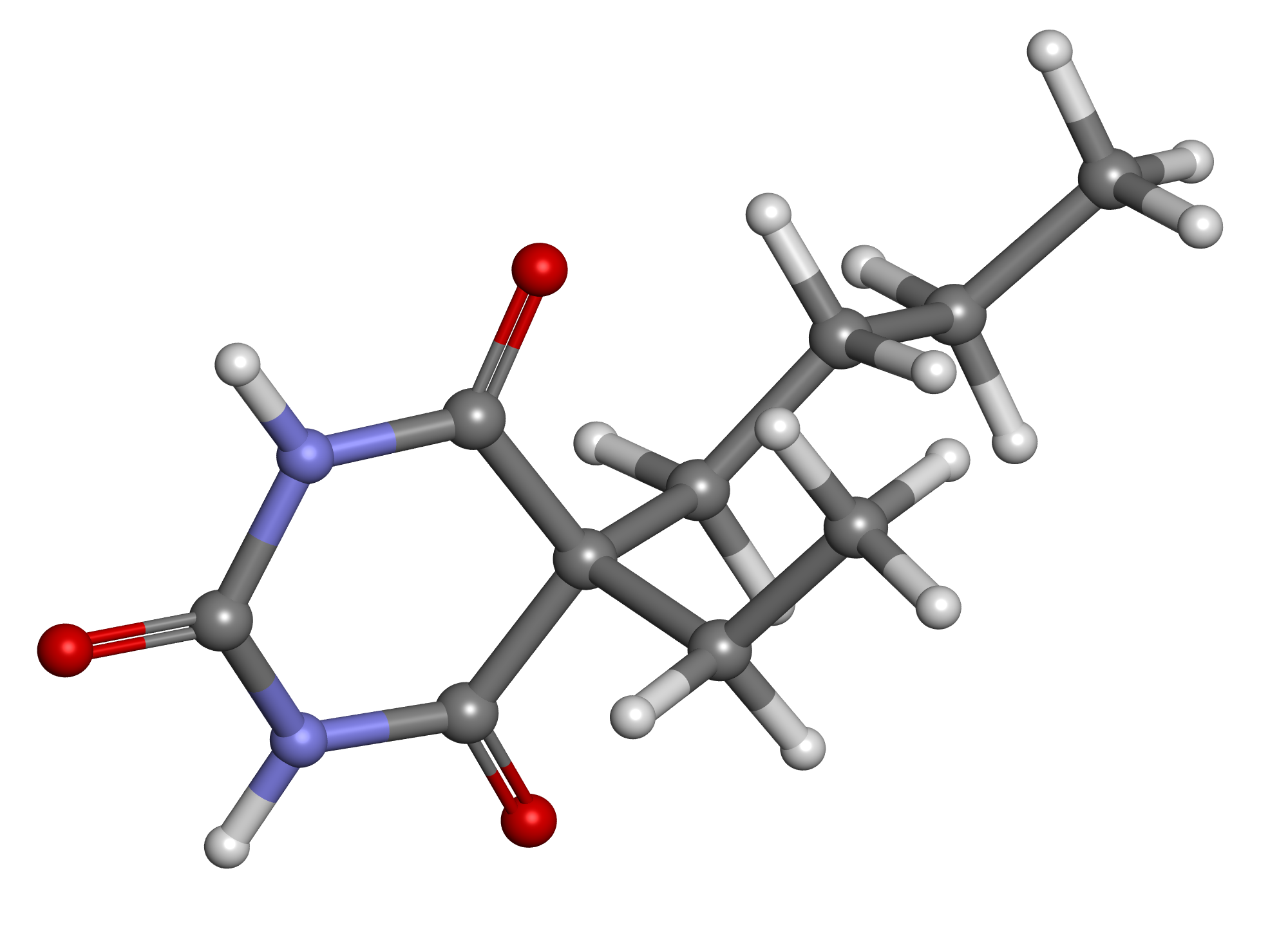

Clinical data
- Trade names: Soneryl
- AHFS/Drugs.com: International Drug Names
- Routes of administration: By mouth
- ATC code: N05CA03 (WHO)

Legal status
- Legal status: AU: S8 (Controlled drug); CA: Schedule IV; DE: Anlage II (Authorized trade only, not prescriptible)

Pharmacokinetic data
- Metabolism: Liver
- Excretion: Kidney

Identifiers
- IUPAC name: 5-Butyl-5-ethyl-1,3-diazinane-2,4,6-trione
- CAS Number: 77-28-1
- PubChem CID: 6473
- DrugBank: DB01353
- ChemSpider: 6229
- UNII: OHZ8QAW6YC
- KEGG: D02618
- ChEMBL: ChEMBL404422
- CompTox Dashboard (EPA): DTXSID70227808
- ECHA InfoCard: 100.000.928

Chemical and physical data
- Formula: C_{10}H_{16}N_{2}O_{3}
- Molar mass: 212.249 g·mol^{−1}
- 3D model (JSmol): Interactive image
- SMILES: O=C1NC(=O)NC(=O)C1(CCCC)CC
- InChI: InChI=1S/C10H16N2O3/c1-3-5-6-10(4-2)7(13)11-9(15)12-8(10)14/h3-6H2,1-2H3,(H2,11,12,13,14,15); Key:STDBAQMTJLUMFW-UHFFFAOYSA-N

Butobarbital, also called butobarbitone or butethal, Soneryl, and Neonal, is a hypnotic drug which is a barbiturate derivative. It was developed by Poulenc Brothers (now part of Sanofi) in 1921.
