= Reposal =

Chemical compound

Clinical data
- Other names: Reposamal, 5-Ethyl-5-(bicyclo(3.2.1)octenyl)barbituric acid
- ATC code: N05CA12 (WHO)

Identifiers
- IUPAC name: 5-bicyclo[3.2.1]oct-2-en-3-yl-5-ethylpyrimidine-2,4,6(1H,3H,5H)-trione
- CAS Number: 3625-25-0
- PubChem CID: 19254
- ChemSpider: 10468690
- UNII: 3T5TIX1AYI
- ChEMBL: ChEMBL505851
- CompTox Dashboard (EPA): DTXSID50877567

Chemical and physical data
- Formula: C_{14}H_{18}N_{2}O_{3}
- Molar mass: 262.309 g·mol^{−1}
- 3D model (JSmol): Interactive image
- SMILES: O=C1NC(=O)NC(=O)C1(CC)C=3C[C@H]2C[C@H](CC2)C=3
- InChI: InChI=1S/C14H18N2O3/c1-2-14(11(17)15-13(19)16-12(14)18)10-6-8-3-4-9(5-8)7-10/h6,8-9H,2-5,7H2,1H3,(H2,15,16,17,18,19)/t8-,9+/m0/s1; Key:MKELYWOVSPVORM-DTWKUNHWSA-N

Reposal is a barbiturate derivative invented in the 1960s in Denmark. It has sedative, hypnotic and anticonvulsant properties, and was used primarily for the treatment of insomnia.
