= Talbutal =

Chemical compound

Clinical data
- Other names: 5-(1-methylpropyl)-5-(2-propenyl)-2,4,6(1H,3H,5H)-pyrimidinetrione
- ATC code: N05CA07 (WHO)

Legal status
- Legal status: CA: Schedule IV; US: Schedule III

Identifiers
- IUPAC name: (RS)-5-allyl-5-sec-butylpyrimidine-2,4,6(1H,3H,5H)-trione
- CAS Number: 115-44-6
- PubChem CID: 8275
- DrugBank: DB00306
- ChemSpider: 7976
- UNII: 4YIR8202AX
- ChEMBL: ChEMBL1200802
- CompTox Dashboard (EPA): DTXSID8023630
- ECHA InfoCard: 100.003.719

Chemical and physical data
- Formula: C_{11}H_{16}N_{2}O_{3}
- Molar mass: 224.260 g·mol^{−1}
- 3D model (JSmol): Interactive image
- SMILES: O=C1NC(=O)NC(=O)C1(C(C)CC)C\C=C
- InChI: InChI=1S/C11H16N2O3/c1-4-6-11(7(3)5-2)8(14)12-10(16)13-9(11)15/h4,7H,1,5-6H2,2-3H3,(H2,12,13,14,15,16); Key:BJVVMKUXKQHWJK-UHFFFAOYSA-N

Talbutal (Lotusate) is a barbiturate with a short to intermediate duration of action. It is a structural isomer of butalbital. Talbutal is a schedule III drug in the U.S.

== Pharmacology ==
Talbutal is a short to intermediate-acting barbiturate. Barbiturates act as nonselective depressants of the central nervous system (CNS), capable of producing all levels of CNS mood alteration from excitation to mild sedation, hypnosis, and deep coma. In sufficiently high therapeutic doses, barbiturates induce anesthesia.

== Mechanism of action ==
Talbutal binds at a distinct binding site associated with a Cl^{−} ionophore at the GABA_{A} receptor, increasing the duration of time for which the Cl^{−} ionophore is open. The post-synaptic inhibitory effect of GABA in the thalamus is, therefore, prolonged.

== Toxicity ==
Symptoms of acute barbiturate poisoning include drowsiness, confusion, coma, respiratory depression, hypotension, and shock.
