= Vinbarbital =

Chemical compound

Clinical data
- Routes of administration: Oral
- ATC code: N05CA09 (WHO)

Legal status
- Legal status: CA: Schedule IV; US: Schedule III

Identifiers
- IUPAC name: 5-ethyl-5-[(1E)-1-methylbut-1-en-1-yl]pyrimidine-2,4,6(1H,3H,5H)-trione
- CAS Number: 125-42-8
- PubChem CID: 5284636
- ChemSpider: 4447681
- UNII: 7NZH2C1T6O
- KEGG: D07322
- ChEMBL: ChEMBL503565
- CompTox Dashboard (EPA): DTXSID00859237 DTXSID1023738, DTXSID00859237
- ECHA InfoCard: 100.004.309

Chemical and physical data
- Formula: C_{11}H_{16}N_{2}O_{3}
- Molar mass: 224.260 g·mol^{−1}
- 3D model (JSmol): Interactive image
- SMILES: O=C1NC(=O)NC(=O)C1(/C(=C/CC)C)CC
- InChI: InChI=1S/C11H16N2O3/c1-4-6-7(3)11(5-2)8(14)12-10(16)13-9(11)15/h6H,4-5H2,1-3H3,(H2,12,13,14,15,16)/b7-6+; Key:RAFOHKSPUDGZPR-VOTSOKGWSA-N

Vinbarbital is a hypnotic drug which is a barbiturate derivative. It was developed by Sharp and Dohme in 1939.
