= Heptabarb =

Chemical compound

Clinical data
- Other names: G-475
- Routes of administration: Oral
- ATC code: N05CA11 (WHO)

Legal status
- Legal status: CA: Schedule IV

Pharmacokinetic data
- Bioavailability: 83%
- Metabolism: Hepatic
- Elimination half-life: 6.1-11.2 hours
- Excretion: Renal

Identifiers
- IUPAC name: 5-cyclohept-1-en-1-yl-5-ethylpyrimidine-2,4,6(1H,3H,5H)-trione
- CAS Number: 509-86-4
- PubChem CID: 10518
- DrugBank: DB01354
- ChemSpider: 10081
- UNII: V10R70ML23
- KEGG: C17725
- ChEMBL: ChEMBL468837
- CompTox Dashboard (EPA): DTXSID10198927
- ECHA InfoCard: 100.007.371

Chemical and physical data
- Formula: C_{13}H_{18}N_{2}O_{3}
- Molar mass: 250.298 g·mol^{−1}
- 3D model (JSmol): Interactive image
- SMILES: O=C1NC(=O)NC(=O)C1(/C2=C/CCCCC2)CC
- InChI: InChI=1S/C13H18N2O3/c1-2-13(9-7-5-3-4-6-8-9)10(16)14-12(18)15-11(13)17/h7H,2-6,8H2,1H3,(H2,14,15,16,17,18); Key:PAZQYDJGLKSCSI-UHFFFAOYSA-N

Heptabarb (INN; Eudan, Medapan, Medomin, Noctyn), also known as heptabarbitone (BAN) or heptabarbital, is a sedative and hypnotic drug of the barbiturate family. It was used in Europe for the treatment of insomnia from the 1950s onwards, but has since been discontinued.

== See also ==
- Barbiturate
