= Butaperazine =

Typical antipsychotic

Clinical data
- ATC code: N05AB09 (WHO)

Legal status
- Legal status: BR: Class C1 (Other controlled substances)

Identifiers
- IUPAC name: 1-[10-[3-(4-Methylpiperazin-1-yl)propyl]phenothiazin-2-yl]butan-1-one
- CAS Number: 653-03-2
- PubChem CID: 12598
- DrugBank: DB13213
- ChemSpider: 12078
- UNII: TXP4T9106S
- KEGG: D02642
- ChEBI: CHEBI:135663
- ChEMBL: ChEMBL1697826
- CompTox Dashboard (EPA): DTXSID1022712
- ECHA InfoCard: 100.010.450

Chemical and physical data
- Formula: C_{24}H_{31}N_{3}OS
- Molar mass: 409.59 g·mol^{−1}
- 3D model (JSmol): Interactive image
- SMILES: O=C(c2cc1N(c3c(Sc1cc2)cccc3)CCCN4CCN(C)CC4)CCC
- InChI: InChI=1S/C24H31N3OS/c1-3-7-22(28)19-10-11-24-21(18-19)27(20-8-4-5-9-23(20)29-24)13-6-12-26-16-14-25(2)15-17-26/h4-5,8-11,18H,3,6-7,12-17H2,1-2H3; Key:DVLBYTMYSMAKHP-UHFFFAOYSA-N

Butaperazine (Repoise, Tyrylen) is a typical antipsychotic of the phenothiazine class. It was approved in 1967, and possibly discontinued in the 1980s.

== Synthesis ==
Synthesis of butaperazine

Butaperazine can be synthesized starting from 2-butyrylphenothiazine (1). It is prepared in a manner that is comparable to the method used in the synthesis of propiomazine and propiopromazine. The phenothiazine is alkylated with 1-(γ-chloropropyl)-4-methylpiperazine (2), which is prepared in the conventional way by alkylating 1-methylpiperazine with 1-bromo-3-chloropropane.

== See also ==
- Typical antipsychotic
- Phenothiazine
