= Camazepam =

Chemical compound

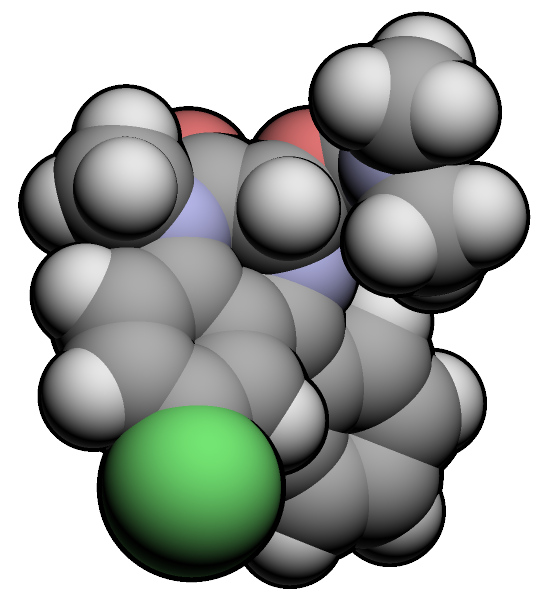

Clinical data
- Pregnancy category: ?
- Routes of administration: Oral
- ATC code: N05BA15 (WHO)

Legal status
- Legal status: BR: Class B1 (Psychoactive drugs); CA: Schedule IV; DE: Anlage III (Special prescription form required); UK: Class C; US: Schedule IV

Pharmacokinetic data
- Bioavailability: 90%
- Metabolism: Hepatic
- Elimination half-life: 6,4-10,5 hours
- Excretion: Renal

Identifiers
- IUPAC name: 7-chloro-1-methyl-2-oxo-5-phenyl-2,3-dihydro-1H-1,4-benzodiazepin-3-yl N,N-dimethylcarbamate
- CAS Number: 36104-80-0
- PubChem CID: 37367
- DrugBank: DB01489
- ChemSpider: 34285
- UNII: HZ3XRH03C3
- KEGG: D07315
- ChEMBL: ChEMBL1095282
- CompTox Dashboard (EPA): DTXSID50865803
- ECHA InfoCard: 100.048.046

Chemical and physical data
- Formula: C_{19}H_{18}ClN_{3}O_{3}
- Molar mass: 371.82 g·mol^{−1}
- 3D model (JSmol): Interactive image
- SMILES: ClC1=CC2=C(C=C1)N(C)C(C(N=C2C3=CC=CC=C3)OC(N(C)C)=O)=O
- InChI: InChI=1S/C19H18ClN3O3/c1-22(2)19(25)26-17-18(24)23(3)15-10-9-13(20)11-14(15)16(21-17)12-7-5-4-6-8-12/h4-11,17H,1-3H3; Key:PXBVEXGRHZFEOF-UHFFFAOYSA-N

Camazepam is a benzodiazepine psychoactive drug, marketed under the brand names Albego, Limpidon and Paxor. It is the dimethyl carbamate ester of temazepam, a metabolite of diazepam. While it possesses anxiolytic, anticonvulsant, skeletal muscle relaxant and hypnotic properties it differs from other benzodiazepines in that its anxiolytic properties are particularly prominent but has comparatively limited anticonvulsant, hypnotic and skeletal muscle relaxant properties.

== Pharmacology ==
Camazepam, like others benzodiazepines, produce a variety of therapeutic and adverse effects by binding to the benzodiazepine receptor site on the GABA_{A} receptor and modulating the function of the GABA receptor, the most prolific inhibitory receptor within the brain. The GABA chemical and receptor system mediates inhibitory or calming effects of camazepam on the nervous system. Compared to other benzodiazepines, it has reduced side effects such as impaired cognition, reaction times and coordination, which makes it best suited as an anxiolytic because of these reduced sides effects. Animal studies have shown camazepam and its active metabolites possess anticonvulsant properties. Unlike other benzodiazepines it does not disrupt normal sleep patterns. Camazepam has been shown in animal experiments to have a very low affinity for benzodiazepine receptors compared to other benzodiazepines. Compared to temazepam, camazepam has shown roughly equal anxiolytic properties, and less anticonvulsant, sedative, and motor-impairing properties.

== Pharmacokinetics ==
Following oral administration, camazepam is almost completely absorbed into the bloodstream, with 90 percent bioavailability achieved in humans. In the human camazepam is metabolised into the active metabolite temazepam. Studies in dogs have shown that the half-life of the terminal elimination phase ranged from 6.4 to 10.5 h.

== Medical uses ==
Camazepam is indicated for the short-term treatment of insomnia and anxiety. As with other benzodiazepines, its use should be reserved for patients in which the sleep disorder is severe, disabling, or causes marked distress.

== Adverse effects ==
With higher doses, such as 40 mg of camazepam, impairments similar to those caused by other benzodiazepines manifest as disrupted sleep patterns and impaired cognitive performance. Skin disorders have been reported with use of camazepam however. One study has shown that camazepam may increase attention.

Research has demonstrated that Camazepam exhibits competitive binding to benzodiazepine receptors within the brain, albeit with a relatively modest affinity in animal models. This interaction with benzodiazepine receptors, facilitated by both Camazepam and its active metabolites, is accountable for the medication's anticonvulsant properties.

== Contraindications ==
Use of camazepam is contraindicated in subjects with known hypersensitivity to drug or allergy to other drugs in the benzodiazepine class or any excipients contained in the pharmaceutical form. Use of camazepam should be avoided or carefully monitored by medical professionals in individuals with the following conditions: myasthenia gravis, severe liver deficiencies (e.g., cirrhosis), severe sleep apnea, pre-existing respiratory depression or cronic pulmonary insufficiency.

== See also ==
- Benzodiazepine
