= Carfenazine =

Chemical compound

Clinical data
- Other names: Proketazine, Carphenazin
- License data: US FDA: Proketazine
- Routes of administration: Oral
- ATC code: none

Legal status
- Legal status: Withdrawn

Identifiers
- IUPAC name: 1-(10-{3-[4-(2-Hydroxyethyl)piperazin-1-yl]propyl}-10H-phenothiazin-2-yl)propan-1-one
- CAS Number: 2622-30-2
- PubChem CID: 18104
- IUPHAR/BPS: 7140
- DrugBank: DB01038
- ChemSpider: 17100
- UNII: CLY16Y8Z7E
- ChEBI: CHEBI:51235
- ChEMBL: ChEMBL1201328
- CompTox Dashboard (EPA): DTXSID8022745
- ECHA InfoCard: 100.018.249

Chemical and physical data
- Formula: C_{24}H_{31}N_{3}O_{2}S
- Molar mass: 425.59 g·mol^{−1}
- 3D model (JSmol): Interactive image
- SMILES: CCC(=O)c1ccc2Sc3ccccc3N(CCCN4CCN(CCO)CC4)c2c1
- InChI: InChI=1S/C24H31N3O2S/c1-2-22(29)19-8-9-24-21(18-19)27(20-6-3-4-7-23(20)30-24)11-5-10-25-12-14-26(15-13-25)16-17-28/h3-4,6-9,18,28H,2,5,10-17H2,1H3; Key:XZSMZRXAEFNJCU-UHFFFAOYSA-N

Carfenazine (INN; former development code WY-2445; BAN carphenazine; USAN carphenazine maleate; brand name Proketazine; former development code NSC-71755) is an antipsychotic and tranquilizer of the phenothiazine group that was withdrawn from the market.

== Synthesis ==
Thieme Synthesis: Patent:

The alkylation reaction between 2-propionyl phenothiazine (1) and 1-bromo-3-chloropropane (2) gives 1-[10-(3-chloropropyl)phenothiazin-2-yl]propan-1-one (3). A second alkylation step, this time with 2-(1-Piperazinyl)ethanol (4), completes the synthesis of carfenazine (5).

Although above procedure is proof-of-concept, bear in mind no protecting group. Other patent uses ketalization technique.

=== Analogs ===
- Butaperazine, uses butanoyl and not propanoyl group
- Fluphenazine, analog with trifluoromethyl on position 2 of the phenothiazine ring.
