= Doxefazepam =

Chemical compound

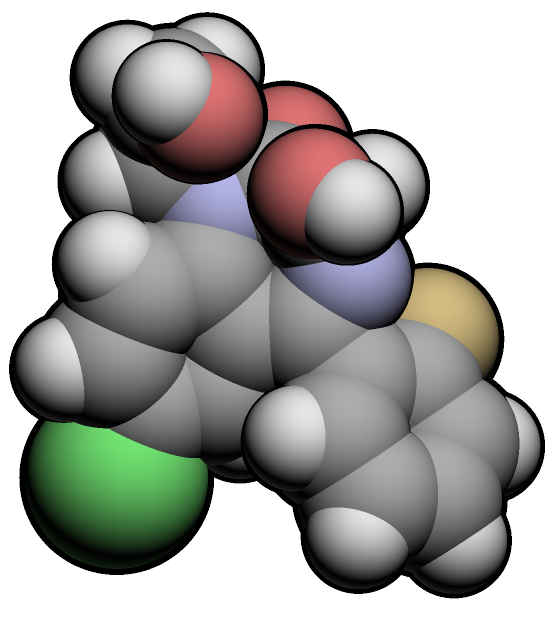

Clinical data
- Routes of administration: Oral
- ATC code: N05CD12 (WHO)

Legal status
- Legal status: CA: Schedule IV; US: Schedule IV

Pharmacokinetic data
- Metabolism: Hepatic
- Elimination half-life: 3-4 hours
- Excretion: Renal

Identifiers
- IUPAC name: 9-chloro-6-(2-fluorophenyl)-4-hydroxy-2-(2-hydroxyethyl)-2,5-diazabicyclo[5.4.0]undeca-5,8,10,12-tetraen-3-one
- CAS Number: 40762-15-0
- PubChem CID: 38668
- DrugBank: DB13837
- ChemSpider: 35431
- UNII: 231RV72C8L
- KEGG: D07327
- ChEMBL: ChEMBL64677
- CompTox Dashboard (EPA): DTXSID2020551

Chemical and physical data
- Formula: C_{17}H_{14}ClFN_{2}O_{3}
- Molar mass: 348.76 g·mol^{−1}
- 3D model (JSmol): Interactive image
- SMILES: FC1=CC=CC=C1C2=NC(C(N(CCO)C3=C2C=C(C=C3)Cl)=O)O
- InChI: InChI=1S/C17H14ClFN2O3/c18-10-5-6-14-12(9-10)15(11-3-1-2-4-13(11)19)20-16(23)17(24)21(14)7-8-22/h1-6,9,16,22-23H,7-8H2; Key:VOJLELRQLPENHL-UHFFFAOYSA-N

Doxefazepam (marketed under brand name Doxans) is a benzodiazepine medication. It possesses anxiolytic, anticonvulsant, sedative and skeletal muscle relaxant properties. It is used therapeutically as a hypnotic. According to Babbini and colleagues in 1975, this derivative of flurazepam was between 2 and 4 times more potent than the latter while at the same time being half as toxic in laboratory animals.

It was patented in 1972 and came into medical use in 1984.

== Side effects ==
Section 5.5 of the article Doxefazepam in volume 66 of the World Health Organization's (WHO) and International Agency for Research on Cancer's (IARC) IARC Monographs On The Evaluation Of Carcinogenic Risks To Humans, an article describing the carcinogenic/toxic effects of doxefazepam on humans and experimental animals, states that there is "inadequate evidence in humans for the carcinogenicity of doxefazepam" and limited evidence in experimental for the carcinogenicity of doxefazepam," and concluded that the overall evaluation of the substance's carcinogenicity to humans is "not classifiable."

== See also ==
- Benzodiazepine
