= Pipamazine =

Chemical compound

Clinical data
- Pregnancy category: Formerly used for morning sickness
- Routes of administration: Oral, intramuscular injection
- ATC code: None

Legal status
- Legal status: Withdrawn

Identifiers
- IUPAC name: 1-[3-(2-chlorophenothiazin-10-yl)propyl]piperidine-4-carboxamide
- CAS Number: 84-04-8
- PubChem CID: 6761
- ChemSpider: 6503
- UNII: 653552FH1N
- KEGG: D02606
- ChEBI: CHEBI:135641
- ChEMBL: ChEMBL1909072
- CompTox Dashboard (EPA): DTXSID3023477
- ECHA InfoCard: 100.001.375

Chemical and physical data
- Formula: C_{21}H_{24}ClN_{3}OS
- Molar mass: 401.95 g·mol^{−1}
- 3D model (JSmol): Interactive image
- SMILES: C1CN(CCC1C(=O)N)CCCN2C3=CC=CC=C3SC4=C2C=C(C=C4)Cl
- InChI: InChI=1S/C21H24ClN3OS/c22-16-6-7-20-18(14-16)25(17-4-1-2-5-19(17)27-20)11-3-10-24-12-8-15(9-13-24)21(23)26/h1-2,4-7,14-15H,3,8-13H2,(H2,23,26); Key:OSJJYEUEJRVVOD-UHFFFAOYSA-N

Pipamazine (INN; trade names Mornidine, Mometine, Nausidol) is a drug of the phenothiazine class formerly used as an antiemetic. It is chemically related to chlorpromazine, but has negligible antipsychotic activity and produces few extrapyramidal side effects.

Pipamazine was introduced to the U.S. market in 1959 by G. D. Searle & Company. It was advertised for morning sickness and postoperative nausea and vomiting, and was claimed to reduce the need for postoperative analgesia. It was eventually withdrawn from the U.S. market in 1969, after reports of hepatotoxicity (liver injury).

There is very little published information on pipamazine; it is mostly absent from modern-day sources, apart from a few passing mentions in the pharmacological literature.

== Adverse effects ==
Mornidine advertisements for postoperative recovery claimed "unusually low side effects". However, contemporary comparative trials found that hypotension (low blood pressure) was a substantial concern when the drug was given at normal dosages for this indication; blood pressure reductions of up to 70 mmHg were reported. Reductions in dosage mitigated hypotension while maintaining antiemetic efficacy.

In his book The Creation of Psychopharmacology, Irish psychiatrist David Healy states that the failure of pipamazine to perform as a neuroleptic and its negative side effect profile helped Searle lose interest in the antipsychotic sector, and contributed to the company's refusal to market haloperidol in the United States.

== Synthesis ==
Thieme Patents:

The alkylation of 2-chloro-10-(3-chloropropyl)phenothiazine [2765-59-5] (1) with Isonipecotamide [39546-32-2] (2) gives pipamazine (3).
