= Chlorproethazine =

Names
- Preferred IUPAC name 3-(2-Chlorophenothiazin-10-yl)-N,N-diethylpropan-1-amine
- Other names RP-4909

Identifiers
CAS Number	84-01-5; 4611-02-3 (HCl)
3D model (JSmol)	Interactive image
ChEMBL	ChEMBL2105938
ChemSpider	59173
ECHA InfoCard	100.001.373
KEGG	D07308
PubChem CID	65750
UNII	960NX27Z07; 520P4U8V2Z (HCl)
CompTox Dashboard (EPA)	DTXSID80232882
- InChI: InChI=1S/C19H23ClN2S/c1-3-21(4-2)12-7-13-22-16-8-5-6-9-18(16)23-19-11-10-15(20)14-17(19)22/h5-6,8-11,14H,3-4,7,12-13H2,1-2H3 Key: DBOUGBAQLIXZLV-UHFFFAOYSA-N; InChI=1/C19H23ClN2S/c1-3-21(4-2)12-7-13-22-16-8-5-6-9-18(16)23-19-11-10-15(20)14-17(19)22/h5-6,8-11,14H,3-4,7,12-13H2,1-2H3 Key: DBOUGBAQLIXZLV-UHFFFAOYAP
- SMILES: Clc2cc1N(c3c(Sc1cc2)cccc3)CCCN(CC)CC

Properties
Chemical formula	C_{19}H_{23}ClN_{2}S
Molar mass	346.91732 g/mol

Pharmacology
ATC code	N05AA07 (WHO)
- Except where otherwise noted, data are given for materials in their standard state (at 25 °C [77 °F], 100 kPa). verify (what is ?) Infobox references

Chlorproethazine, sold under the brand name Neuriplege, is a drug of the phenothiazine group described as a muscle relaxant or tranquilizer which is or has been marketed in Europe as a topical cream for the treatment of muscle pain. It has been associated with photoallergic contact dermatitis.

== Synthesis ==
Chlorproethazine can be synthesized from a diphenylsulfide derivative. The general scheme is sufficiently flexible to permit the interchange of the order of some of the steps.

Patent:

Thus alkylation of 2-(2-bromo-phenylsulfanyl)-5-chloro-aniline [105790-02-1] (1) with 3-chloro-1-diethylaminopropane [104-77-8] (2) leads to the intermediate (3). Ring closure as above by nucleophilic aromatic displacement leads to the antipsychotic drug chlorproethazine (4).

The last step uses copper powder and is a form of the Ullmann condensation (i.e. the Goldberg reaction).
