= Piperacetazine =

Chemical compound

Clinical data
- Trade names: Actazine, Quide, Psymod
- AHFS/Drugs.com: International Drug Names

Identifiers
- IUPAC name: 1-[10-[3-[4-(2-hydroxyethyl)piperidin-1-yl]propyl]phenothiazin-2-yl]ethanone
- CAS Number: 3819-00-9
- PubChem CID: 19675
- ChemSpider: 18533
- UNII: KL6248WNW4
- ChEBI: CHEBI:92293
- ChEMBL: ChEMBL1584
- CompTox Dashboard (EPA): DTXSID7023481
- ECHA InfoCard: 100.021.194

Chemical and physical data
- Formula: C_{24}H_{30}N_{2}O_{2}S
- Molar mass: 410.58 g·mol^{−1}
- 3D model (JSmol): Interactive image
- SMILES: CC(=O)c1ccc2Sc3ccccc3N(CCCN4CCC(CCO)CC4)c2c1
- InChI: InChI=InChI=1S/C24H30N2O2S/c1-18(28)20-7-8-24-22(17-20)26(21-5-2-3-6-23(21)29-24)13-4-12-25-14-9-19(10-15-25)11-16-27/h2-3,5-8,17,19,27H,4,9-16H2,1H3; Key:BTFMCMVEUCGQDX-UHFFFAOYSA-N

Piperacetazine (Quide) is an antipsychotic prodrug, most notably used for schizophrenia. It is a phenothiazine derivative. Based on clinical trial data, it appears to have similar efficacy as chlorpromazine. However, very little research has been done since the 1970s, and it is not a commonly used drug today.

== Side effects ==
The side effect profile of piperacetazine is similar to that of other typical antipsychotics. The most common side effects of piperacetazine are dizziness, drowsiness, fainting, orthostatic hypotension, and extrapyramidal symptoms. Less common side effects include nausea, vomiting, bradycardia, euphoria, and headache. Rare side effects include leukopenia, thrombocytopenia, galactorrhea, amenorrhea, seizures, urinary retention, and jaundice.
