= Thiopropazate =

Chemical compound

Clinical data
- Trade names: Artalan, Dartal, Dartalan, Dartan
- ATC code: N05AB05 (WHO)

Identifiers
- IUPAC name: 2-[4-[3-(2-chlorophenothiazin-10-yl)propyl]piperazin-1-yl]ethyl acetate
- CAS Number: 84-06-0
- PubChem CID: 6762
- ChemSpider: 6504
- UNII: 0JFY081Q2X
- KEGG: D09216
- ChEBI: CHEBI:59119
- ChEMBL: ChEMBL1697851
- CompTox Dashboard (EPA): DTXSID6023654
- ECHA InfoCard: 100.001.376

Chemical and physical data
- Formula: C_{23}H_{28}ClN_{3}O_{2}S
- Molar mass: 446.01 g·mol^{−1}
- 3D model (JSmol): Interactive image
- SMILES: CC(=O)OCCN1CCN(CC1)CCCN2C3=CC=CC=C3SC4=C2C=C(C=C4)Cl
- InChI: InChI=1S/C23H28ClN3O2S/c1-18(28)29-16-15-26-13-11-25(12-14-26)9-4-10-27-20-5-2-3-6-22(20)30-23-8-7-19(24)17-21(23)27/h2-3,5-8,17H,4,9-16H2,1H3; Key:AIUHRQHVWSUTGJ-UHFFFAOYSA-N

Thiopropazate (Artalan, Dartal, Dartalan, Dartan) is a typical antipsychotic of the phenothiazine class. It is a prodrug to perphenazine.

Thiopropazate is manufactured by Searle (US, UK) & Boehringer Mannheim (Germany) Thiopropazate is sold by Chembase, AAA Chemistry, ZINC, AKos Consulting & Solutions, Boc Sciences, ChemFrog, and ChemMol

== Synthesis ==
Thieme Patent:

The alkylation of 2-chloro-10-(3-chloropropyl)phenothiazine [2765-59-5] (1) with Piperazine (2) gives N-Desmethylprochlorperazine [40323-85-1] (3). Further alkylation with 2-Bromoethyl acetate [927-68-4] (4) gives Thiopropazate (5).

== See also ==
- Typical antipsychotic
- Phenothiazine
