= Methdilazine =

Chemical compound

Clinical data
- AHFS/Drugs.com: Monograph
- ATC code: R06AD04 (WHO)

Identifiers
- IUPAC name: 10-[(1-methylpyrrolidin-3-yl) methyl]- 10H-phenothiazine
- CAS Number: 1982-37-2
- PubChem CID: 14677
- IUPHAR/BPS: 7231
- DrugBank: DB00902
- ChemSpider: 14009
- UNII: 4Q13LY9Z8X
- KEGG: D04979
- ChEBI: CHEBI:6823
- ChEMBL: ChEMBL1200959
- CompTox Dashboard (EPA): DTXSID6023282
- ECHA InfoCard: 100.016.220

Chemical and physical data
- Formula: C_{18}H_{20}N_{2}S
- Molar mass: 296.43 g·mol^{−1}
- 3D model (JSmol): Interactive image
- SMILES: S2c1ccccc1N(c3c2cccc3)CC4CCN(C)C4
- InChI: InChI=1S/C18H20N2S/c1-19-11-10-14(12-19)13-20-15-6-2-4-8-17(15)21-18-9-5-3-7-16(18)20/h2-9,14H,10-13H2,1H3; Key:HTMIBDQKFHUPSX-UHFFFAOYSA-N

Methdilazine (Dilosyn, Tacaryl) is a first-generation antihistamine with anticholinergic properties of the phenothiazine class.

== Synthesis ==
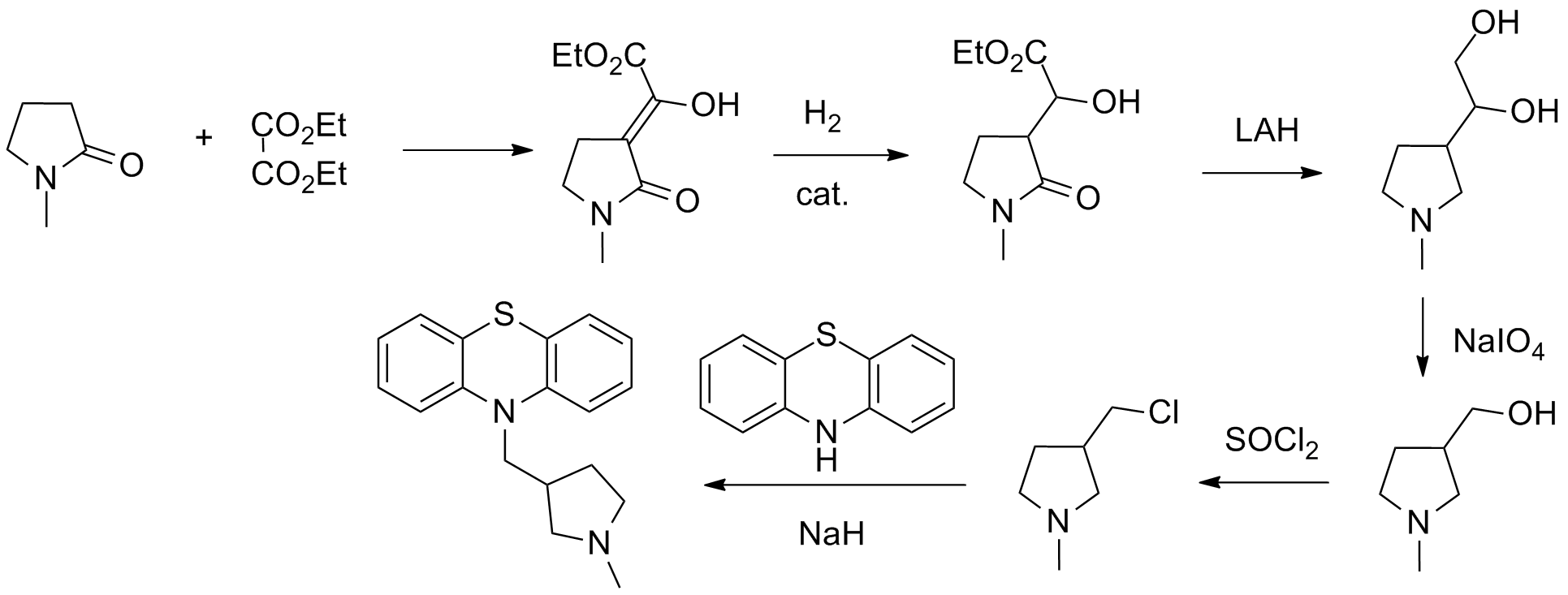
Methdilazine synthesis: R. F. Feldkamp and Y. H. Wu; Mead Johnson & Company; U.S. patent 2,945,855 (1960).

== See also ==
- Phenothiazine
