= Bromazepam =

Benzodiazepine drug

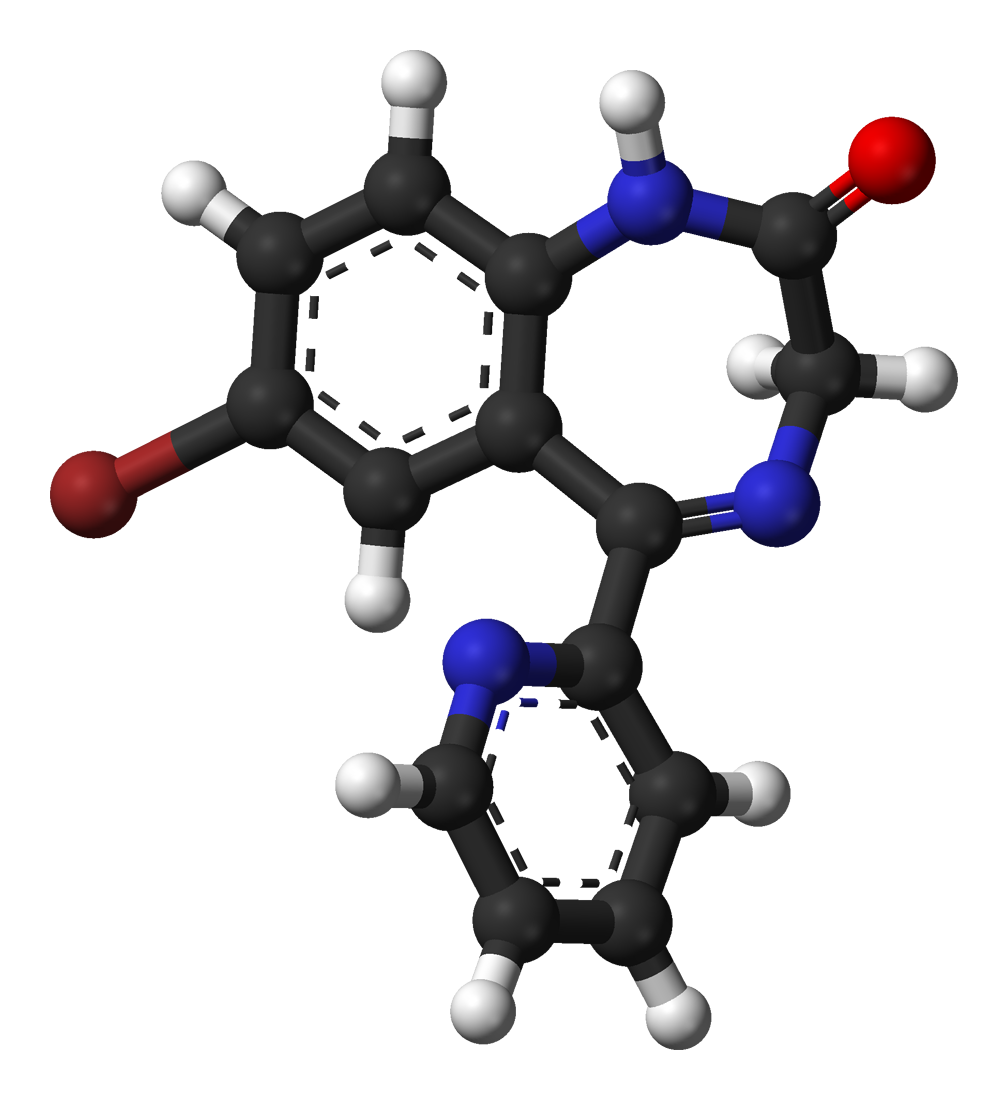

Clinical data
- Trade names: Lexotan, Lexilium, others
- AHFS/Drugs.com: Micromedex Detailed Consumer Information
- License data: US DailyMed: Bromazepam
- Addiction liability: High
- Routes of administration: By mouth
- ATC code: N05BA08 (WHO)

Legal status
- Legal status: AU: S4 (Prescription only) /Appendix D, clause 5 (Benzodiazepine derivatives); Appendix K, clause 1; BR: Class B1 (Psychoactive drugs); CA: Schedule IV; DE: Prescription only (Anlage III for higher doses); UK: Class C; US: Schedule IV; SE: Förteckning IV In general: ℞ (Prescription only)

Pharmacokinetic data
- Bioavailability: 84%
- Protein binding: 70%
- Metabolism: Liver: P450
- Metabolites: 3-hydroxybromazepam
- Elimination half-life: 12–20 hours (avg. 17 hours)
- Excretion: Urine 69%, as metabolites

Identifiers
- IUPAC name: 7-bromo-5-(pyridin-2-yl)-1H-benzo[e][1,4]diazepin-2(3H)-one
- CAS Number: 1812-30-2
- PubChem CID: 2441
- DrugBank: DB01558
- ChemSpider: 2347
- UNII: X015L14V0O
- KEGG: D01245
- ChEBI: CHEBI:31302
- ChEMBL: ChEMBL277062
- CompTox Dashboard (EPA): DTXSID40171081
- ECHA InfoCard: 100.015.748

Chemical and physical data
- Formula: C_{14}H_{10}BrN_{3}O
- Molar mass: 316.158 g·mol^{−1}
- 3D model (JSmol): Interactive image
- SMILES: C1C(=O)NC2=C(C=C(C=C2)Br)C(=N1)C3=CC=CC=N3
- InChI: InChI=1S/C14H10BrN3O/c15-9-4-5-11-10(7-9)14(17-8-13(19)18-11)12-3-1-2-6-16-12/h1-7H,8H2,(H,18,19); Key:VMIYHDSEFNYJSL-UHFFFAOYSA-N

Bromazepam, sold under many brand names, is a benzodiazepine. It is mainly an anti-anxiety agent with similar side effects to diazepam. In addition to being used to treat anxiety, bromazepam may be used as a premedication prior to minor surgery. Bromazepam typically comes in doses of 1.5 mg, 3 mg and 6 mg tablets.

It was patented in 1961 by Roche and approved for medical use in 1974.

== Medical uses ==
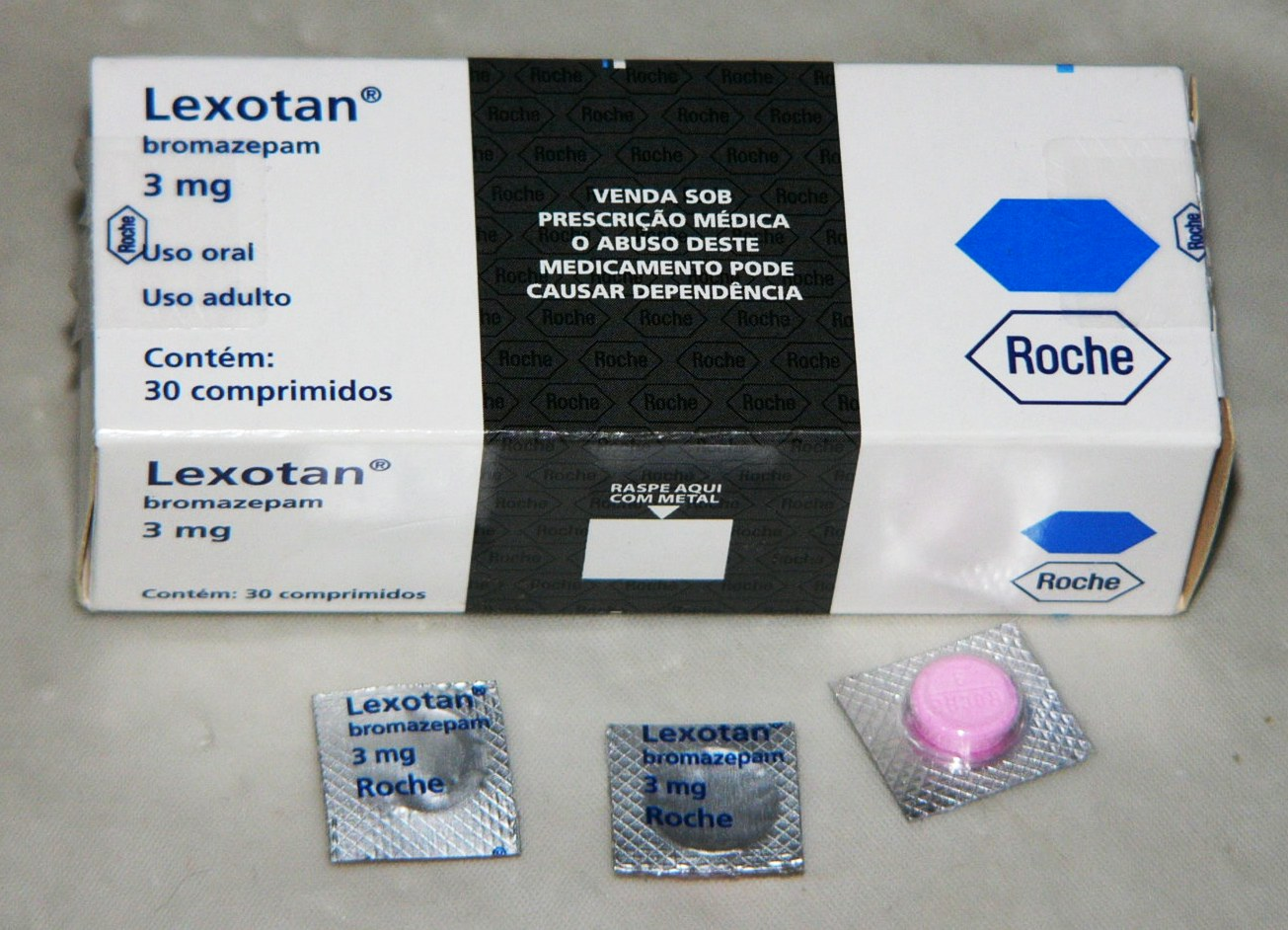
Lexotan (bromazepam) medicine package from 2006

Medical uses include treatment of severe anxiety. Despite certain side effects and the emergence of alternative products (e.g., pregabalin), benzodiazepine medication remains an effective way of reducing problematic symptoms, and is typically deemed effective by patients and medical professionals. Similarly to other intermediate-acting depressants, it may be used as hypnotic medication, though prescribing for insomnia is generally limited to a maximum of four weeks due to dependence risks and limited long-term efficacy or in order to mitigate withdrawal effects of alcohol consumption.

== Pharmacology ==
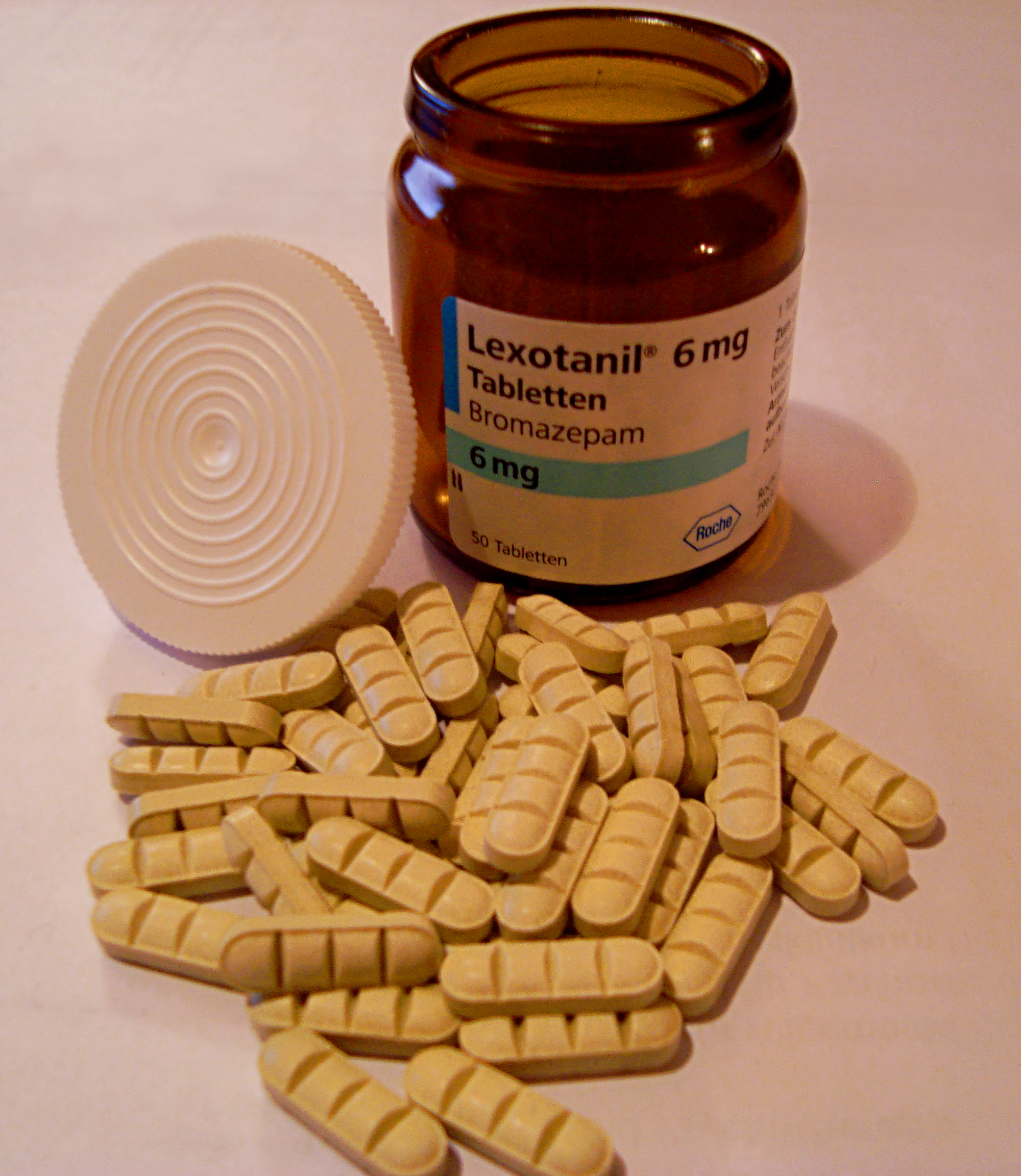
50 pills of Lexotanil (containing 6 mg of bromazepam apiece) as sold by Hoffmann-La Roche in Germany.

Bromazepam is a "classical" benzodiazepine; other classical benzodiazepines include: diazepam, clonazepam, oxazepam, lorazepam, nitrazepam, flurazepam, and clorazepate. Its molecular structure is composed of a diazepine connected to a benzene ring and a pyridine ring, the benzene ring having a single nitrogen atom that replaces one of the carbon atoms in the ring structure. It is a 1,4-benzodiazepine, which means that the nitrogens on the seven-sided diazepine ring are in the 1 and 4 positions.

Bromazepam binds to the GABA_{A} receptor, causing a conformational change and increasing the inhibitory effects of GABA. It acts as a positive modulator, increasing the receptors' response when activated by GABA itself or an agonist (such as alcohol). As opposed to barbital, benzodiazepines are not GABA receptor activators and rely on increasing the neurotransmitter's natural activity. Bromazepam is an intermediate-acting benzodiazepine, is moderately lipophilic compared to other substances of its class and metabolised hepatically via oxidative pathways. It does not possess any antidepressant or antipsychotic qualities.

After night time administration of bromazepam a highly significant reduction of gastric acid secretion occurs during sleep followed by a highly significant rebound in gastric acid production the following day.

Bromazepam alters the electrical status of the brain causing an increase in beta activity and a decrease in alpha activity in EEG recordings.

=== Pharmacokinetics ===
Bromazepam is reported to be metabolized by a hepatic enzyme belonging to the cytochrome P450 family of enzymes. In 2003, a team led by Oda Manami at Oita Medical University reported that CYP3A4, a member of the Cytochrome P450 family, was not the responsible enzyme since itraconazole, a known inhibitor of CYP3A4, did not affect its metabolism. In 1995, J. van Harten at the Solvay Pharmaceutical Department of Clinical Pharmacology in Weesp reported that fluvoxamine, which is a potent inhibitor of CYP1A2, a less potent CYP3A4 inhibitor, and a negligible inhibitor of CYP2D6, does inhibit its metabolism.

The major metabolite of bromazepam is hydroxybromazepam, which is an active agent too and has a half-life approximately equal to that of bromazepam.

== Side effects ==
Bromazepam is similar in side effects to other benzodiazepines. The most common side effects reported are drowsiness, sedation, ataxia, memory impairment, and dizziness. Impairments to memory functions are common with bromazepam and include a reduced working memory and reduced ability to process environmental information. A 1975 experiment on healthy, male college students exploring the effects of four different drugs on learning capacity observed that taking bromazepam alone at 6 mg 3 times daily for 2 weeks impaired learning capacities significantly. In combination with alcohol, impairments in learning capacity became even more pronounced. Various studies report impaired memory, visual information processing and sensory data and impaired psychomotor performance; deterioration of cognition including attention capacity and impaired co-ordinative skills; impaired reactive and attention performance, which can impair driving skills; drowsiness and decrease in libido. Unsteadiness after taking bromazepam is, however, less pronounced than other benzodiazepines such as lorazepam.

On occasion, benzodiazepines can induce extreme alterations in memory such as anterograde amnesia and amnesic automatism, which may have medico-legal consequences. Such reactions occur usually only at the higher dose end of the prescribing spectrum.

Very rarely, dystonia can develop.

Up to 30% treated on a long-term basis develop a form of dependence, i.e. these patients cannot stop the medication without experiencing physical or psychological benzodiazepine withdrawal symptoms.

Leukopenia and liver damage of the cholestatic type with or without jaundice have additionally been seen; the original manufacturer Roche recommends regular laboratory examinations to be performed routinely.

Ambulatory patients should be warned that bromazepam may impair the ability to drive vehicles and to operate machinery. The impairment is worsened by consumption of alcohol, because both act as central nervous system depressants. During the course of therapy, tolerance to the sedative effect usually develops.

=== Frequency and seriousness of adverse effects ===
As with all medication, the frequency and seriousness of side-effects varies greatly depending on quantities consumed. In a study about bromazepam's negative effects on psychomotor skills and driving ability, it was noted that 3 mg doses caused minimal impairment. It also appeared that impairment may be tied to methods of testing more so than on the product's intrinsic activity.

Moreover, side effects other than drowsiness, dizziness and ataxia seem to be rare and not experienced by more than a few percent of users. The use of other, comparable medication seems to display an identically moderate side effect profile.

=== Tolerance, dependence and withdrawal ===
Prolonged use of bromazepam can cause tolerance and may lead to both physical and psychological dependence on the drug, and as a result, it is a medication which is controlled by international law. It is nonetheless important to note that dependence, long-term use and misuse occur in a minority of cases and are not representative of most patients' experience with this type of medication.

It shares with other benzodiazepines the risk of abuse, misuse, psychological dependence or physical dependence. A withdrawal study demonstrated both psychological dependence and physical dependence on bromazepam including marked rebound anxiety after 4 weeks chronic use. Those whose dose was gradually reduced experienced no withdrawal.

Patients treated with bromazepam for generalised anxiety disorder were found to experience withdrawal symptoms such as a worsening of anxiety, as well as the development of physical withdrawal symptoms when abruptly withdrawn bromazepam. Abrupt or over rapid withdrawal from bromazepam after chronic use even at therapeutic prescribed doses can lead to a severe withdrawal syndrome including status epilepticus and a condition resembling delerium tremens.

Animal studies have shown that chronic administration of diazepam (or bromazepam) causes a decrease in spontaneous locomotor activity, decreased turnover of noradrenaline and dopamine and serotonin, increased activity of tyrosine hydroxylase and increased levels of the catecholamines. During withdrawal of bromazepam or diazepam a fall in tryptophan, serotonin levels occurs as part of the benzodiazepine withdrawal syndrome. Changes in the levels of these chemicals in the brain can cause headaches, anxiety, tension, depression, insomnia, restlessness, confusion, irritability, sweating, dysphoria, dizziness, derealization, depersonalization, numbness/tingling of extremities, hypersensitivity to light, sound, and smell, perceptual distortions, nausea, vomiting, diarrhea, appetite loss, hallucinations, delirium, seizures, tremor, stomach cramps, myalgia, agitation, palpitations, tachycardia, panic attacks, short-term memory loss, and hyperthermia.

=== Overdose ===
Bromazepam is commonly involved in drug overdoses. A severe bromazepam benzodiazepine overdose may result in an alpha pattern coma type. The toxicity of bromazepam in overdosage increases when combined with other CNS depressant drugs such as alcohol or sedative hypnotic drugs. Similarly to other benzodiazepines however, being a positive modulator of certain neuroreceptors and not an agonist, the product has reduced overdose potential compared to older products of the barbiturate class. Its consumption alone is very seldom fatal in healthy adults.

Bromazepam was in 2005 the most common benzodiazepine involved in intentional overdoses in France. Bromazepam has also been responsible for accidental poisonings in companion animals. A review of benzodiazepine poisonings in cats and dogs from 1991 to 1994 found bromazepam to be responsible for significantly more poisonings than any other benzodiazepine.

== Contraindications ==
Benzodiazepines require special precaution if used in elderly, pregnant, child, alcohol- or drug-dependent individuals and individuals with comorbid psychiatric disorders.

=== Special populations ===
- Globally, bromazepam is contraindicated and should be used with caution in women who are pregnant, the elderly, patients with a history of alcohol or other substance abuse disorders and children.
- In 1987, a team of scientists led by Ochs reported that the elimination half-life, peak serum concentration, and serum free fraction are significantly elevated and the oral clearance and volume of distribution significantly lowered in elderly subjects. The clinical consequence is that the elderly should be treated with lower doses than younger patients.
- Bromazepam may affect driving and ability to operate machinery.
- Bromazepam is pregnancy category D, a classification that means that bromazepam has been shown to cause harm to the unborn child. The Hoffman LaRoche product information leaflet warns against breast feeding while taking bromazepam. There has been at least one report of sudden infant death syndrome linked to breast feeding while consuming bromazepam.

== Interactions ==
Cimetidine, fluvoxamine and propranolol causes a marked increase in the elimination half-life of bromazepam leading to increased accumulation of bromazepam.

== Society and culture ==
=== Drug misuse ===
Bromazepam has a similar misuse risk as other benzodiazepines such as diazepam. In France car accidents involving psychotropic drugs in combination with alcohol (itself a major contributor) found benzodiazepines, mainly diazepam, nordiazepam, and bromazepam, to be the most common drug present in the blood stream, almost twice that of the next-most-common drug cannabis. Bromazepam has also been used in serious criminal offences including robbery, homicide, and sexual assault.

=== Brand names ===
It is marketed under several brand names, including, Brozam, Lectopam, Lexomil, Lexotan, Lexilium, Lexaurin, Brazepam, Rekotnil, Bromaze, Somalium, Lexatin, Calmepam, Zepam and Lexotanil.

=== Legal status ===
Bromazepam is a Schedule IV drug under the Convention on Psychotropic Substances.

=== Synthesis ===
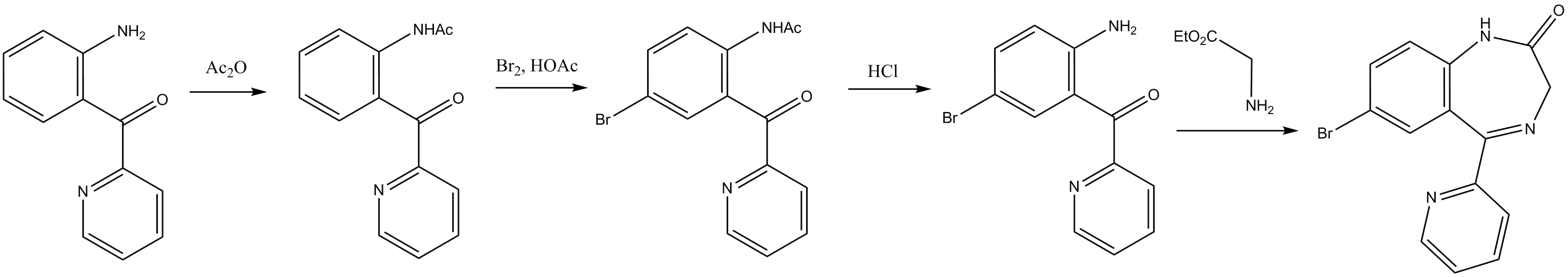
Bromazepam synthesis.
