= Emylcamate =

Anxiolytic and muscle relaxant drug

Clinical data
- ATC code: N05BC03 (WHO)

Legal status
- Legal status: BR: Class C1 (Other controlled substances)

Identifiers
- IUPAC name: 3-methyl-3-pentanol carbamate
- CAS Number: 78-28-4
- PubChem CID: 6526
- DrugBank: DB13572
- ChemSpider: 6278
- UNII: KCJ747D3R4
- KEGG: D07317
- ChEBI: CHEBI:134769
- ChEMBL: ChEMBL2104208
- CompTox Dashboard (EPA): DTXSID40228645
- ECHA InfoCard: 100.001.002

Chemical and physical data
- Formula: C_{7}H_{15}NO_{2}
- Molar mass: 145.202 g·mol^{−1}
- 3D model (JSmol): Interactive image
- SMILES: O=C(OC(C)(CC)CC)N
- InChI: InChI=1S/C7H15NO2/c1-4-7(3,5-2)10-6(8)9/h4-5H2,1-3H3,(H2,8,9); Key:SLWGJZPKHAXZQL-UHFFFAOYSA-N

Emylcamate (marketed as Striatran by Merck) is an anxiolytic and muscle relaxant. It was patented in the US in 1961 (US Patent 2,972,564) and advertised for the treatment of anxiety and tension. It was claimed to be superior to meprobamate, which would eventually replace emylcamate.

A study of the drug's effects in mice was done in 1959. It concluded that at 50 mg/kg emylcamate gave a 63% decrease in motor activity compared with meprobamate's 32% decrease, a doubling in effective potency. The therapeutic index in mice was also established:

Meprobamate	Emylcamate	Effect
175	123	ED_{50} (mg/kg)
600	550	LD_{50} (mg/kg)
3.4	4.4	Therapeutic index

Emylcamate also has a faster intra-parenteral onset than meprobamate, 3 minutes compared with 35.

The drug has been encountered online as a novel designer drug.

== Synthesis ==
Emylcamate is the carbamate of the tertiary alcohol 3-methyl-3-pentanol. The first patented synthesis involved treating that alcohol with potassium cyanate and trichloroacetic acid. In 1963, an improved synthesis was reported using sodium cyanate and trifluoroacetic acid.
