= Dixyrazine =

Names
- IUPAC name (RS)-2-[2-[4-(2-methyl-3-phenothiazin-10-ylpropyl)piperazin-1-yl]ethoxy]ethanol
- Other names UCB-3412

Identifiers
| CAS Number | 2470-73-7 |
| 3D model (JSmol) | Interactive image |
| ChemSpider | 16265 |
| ECHA InfoCard | 100.017.811 |
| EC Number | 219-591-3 |
| KEGG | D07865 |
| PubChem CID | 17182 |
| UNII | 7H368W3AYC |
| CompTox Dashboard (EPA) | DTXSID10947639 |
- InChI: InChI=1S/C24H33N3O2S/c1-20(18-26-12-10-25(11-13-26)14-16-29-17-15-28)19-27-21-6-2-4-8-23(21)30-24-9-5-3-7-22(24)27/h2-9,20,28H,10-19H2,1H3 Key: MSYUMPGNGDNTIQ-UHFFFAOYSA-N; InChI=1/C24H33N3O2S/c1-20(18-26-12-10-25(11-13-26)14-16-29-17-15-28)19-27-21-6-2-4-8-23(21)30-24-9-5-3-7-22(24)27/h2-9,20,28H,10-19H2,1H3 Key: MSYUMPGNGDNTIQ-UHFFFAOYAI
- SMILES: CC(CN1CCN(CC1)CCOCCO)CN2C3=CC=CC=C3SC4=CC=CC=C42

Properties
| Chemical formula | C_{24}H_{33}N_{3}O_{2}S |
| Molar mass | 427.60272 g/mol |

Pharmacology
| ATC code | N05AB01 (WHO) |
| Legal status | BR: Class C1 (Other controlled substances) |
- Except where otherwise noted, data are given for materials in their standard state (at 25 °C [77 °F], 100 kPa). verify (what is ?) Infobox references

Dixyrazine, also known as dixypazin (oxalate), sold under the brand names Ansiolene, Esocalm, Esucos, Metronal, and Roscal, is a typical antipsychotic of the phenothiazine group described as a neuroleptic and antihistamine. It was first introduced in Germany in 1969. It is used as a neuroleptic, anxiolytic, and antihistamine in doses between 12.5 and 75 mg a day.

== Synthesis ==
Synthesis of dixyrazine

Sodamide alkylation of phenothiazine (1) with 1-bromo-3-chloro-2-methylpropane (2) gives 10-(3-Chloro-2-methylpropyl)phenothiazine (3). Completion of the sidechain by alkylation with 1-[2-(2-hydroxyethoxy)ethyl]piperazine (4) and displacement of the halogen completes the synthesis of dixyrazine (5).
