= Nifenalol =

Names
- IUPAC name 1-(4-Nitrophenyl)-2-(propan-2-ylamino)ethanol
- Other names Isophenethanol

Identifiers
CAS Number	7413-36-7
3D model (JSmol)	Interactive image
ChemSpider	6078
ECHA InfoCard	100.028.203
PubChem CID	6317
UNII	D1DE63830P
CompTox Dashboard (EPA)	DTXSID9048693
- InChI: InChI=1S/C11H16N2O3/c1-8(2)12-7-11(14)9-3-5-10(6-4-9)13(15)16/h3-6,8,11-12,14H,7H2,1-2H3 Key: UAORFCGRZIGNCI-UHFFFAOYSA-N
- SMILES: CC(C)NCC(C1=CC=C(C=C1)[N+](=O)[O-])O

Properties
Chemical formula	C_{11}H_{16}N_{2}O_{3}
Molar mass	224.260 g·mol^{−1}
- Except where otherwise noted, data are given for materials in their standard state (at 25 °C [77 °F], 100 kPa). Infobox references

Nifenalol is a beta-adrenoceptor antagonist.
