= Vinylbital =

Chemical compound

Clinical data
- Routes of administration: Oral
- ATC code: N05CA08 (WHO)

Legal status
- Legal status: BR: Class B1 (Psychoactive drugs); CA: Schedule IV; DE: Anlage II (Authorized trade only, not prescriptible); US: Schedule IV

Pharmacokinetic data
- Metabolism: Hepatic
- Excretion: Renal

Identifiers
- IUPAC name: 5-(1-methylbutyl)-5-vinylpyrimidine-2,4,6(1H,3H,5H)-trione
- CAS Number: 2430-49-1
- PubChem CID: 72135
- ChemSpider: 65109
- UNII: 3W58ITX06Q
- KEGG: D07321
- CompTox Dashboard (EPA): DTXSID50862938
- ECHA InfoCard: 100.017.633

Chemical and physical data
- Formula: C_{11}H_{16}N_{2}O_{3}
- Molar mass: 224.260 g·mol^{−1}
- 3D model (JSmol): Interactive image
- SMILES: O=C1NC(=O)NC(=O)C1(\C=C)C(C)CCC
- InChI: InChI=1S/C11H16N2O3/c1-4-6-7(3)11(5-2)8(14)12-10(16)13-9(11)15/h5,7H,2,4,6H2,1,3H3,(H2,12,13,14,15,16); Key:KGKJZEKQJQQOTD-UHFFFAOYSA-N

Vinylbital, also known as butylvinal, is a sedative, hypnotic, and central nervous system depressant within the drug class of barbiturates, It was developed by Aktiebolaget Pharmacia in the 1950s. or "barbiturate derivative."
