= Crotylbarbital =

Chemical compound

Clinical data
- ATC code: none

Identifiers
- IUPAC name: 5-but-2-enyl-5-ethyl-1,3-diazinane-2,4,6-trione
- CAS Number: 1952-67-6
- PubChem CID: 5364821
- ChemSpider: 4516954
- UNII: SXW2HL5JU7
- CompTox Dashboard (EPA): DTXSID90905095
- ECHA InfoCard: 100.016.162

Chemical and physical data
- Formula: C_{10}H_{14}N_{2}O_{3}
- Molar mass: 210.233 g·mol^{−1}
- 3D model (JSmol): Interactive image
- SMILES: O=C1NC(=O)NC(=O)C1(CC)C/C=C/C
- InChI: InChI=1S/C10H14N2O3/c1-3-5-6-10(4-2)7(13)11-9(15)12-8(10)14/h3,5H,4,6H2,1-2H3,(H2,11,12,13,14,15)/b5-3+; Key:KNMOHCLEINXVBG-HWKANZROSA-N

Crotylbarbital (Mepertan, Kalipnon, Barotal), also known as crotarbital, is a barbiturate derivative developed by Eli Lilly in the 1930s. It has sedative and hypnotic effects, and was used for the treatment of insomnia until it was replaced by newer alternative drugs with fewer side effects and lower risk of overdose.

== See also ==
- Barbiturate
