= Moperone =

Chemical compound

Clinical data
- Trade names: Luvatren (discontinued)
- ATC code: N05AD04 (WHO)

Legal status
- Legal status: BR: Class C1 (Other controlled substances)

Identifiers
- IUPAC name: 1-(4-fluorophenyl)-4-[4-hydroxy-4-(4-methylphenyl)piperidin-1-yl]butan-1-one
- CAS Number: 1050-79-9
- PubChem CID: 4249
- DrugBank: DB13554
- ChemSpider: 4100
- UNII: OU730881W5
- KEGG: D02623
- CompTox Dashboard (EPA): DTXSID6049062
- ECHA InfoCard: 100.012.625

Chemical and physical data
- Formula: C_{22}H_{26}FNO_{2}
- Molar mass: 355.453 g·mol^{−1}
- 3D model (JSmol): Interactive image
- SMILES: CC1=CC=C(C=C1)C1(O)CCN(CCCC(=O)C2=CC=C(F)C=C2)CC1
- InChI: InChI=1S/C22H26FNO2/c1-17-4-8-19(9-5-17)22(26)12-15-24(16-13-22)14-2-3-21(25)18-6-10-20(23)11-7-18/h4-11,26H,2-3,12-16H2,1H3; Key:AGAHNABIDCTLHW-UHFFFAOYSA-N

Moperone (Luvatren, since discontinued) is a typical antipsychotic of the butyrophenone class which is marketed in Japan for the treatment of schizophrenia. It is an antagonist for the D_{2} (K_{i} 0.7–1.9 nM), D_{3} (K_{i} 0.1–1 nM), and 5-HT_{2A} (K_{i} 52 nM) receptors. It also has a high binding affinity for the sigma receptors.
