= Trifluperidol =

Typical antipsychotic

Clinical data
- Trade names: Triperidol
- AHFS/Drugs.com: International Drug Names
- Routes of administration: Oral
- ATC code: N05AD02 (WHO)

Legal status
- Legal status: BR: Class C1 (Other controlled substances)

Identifiers
- IUPAC name: 1-(4-fluorophenyl)-4-[4-hydroxy-4-[3-(trifluoromethyl)phenyl]piperidin-1-yl]butan-1-one
- CAS Number: 749-13-3
- PubChem CID: 5567
- DrugBank: DB13552
- ChemSpider: 5366
- UNII: R8869Q7R8I
- ChEMBL: ChEMBL15023
- CompTox Dashboard (EPA): DTXSID4023703

Chemical and physical data
- Formula: C_{22}H_{23}F_{4}NO_{2}
- Molar mass: 409.425 g·mol^{−1}
- 3D model (JSmol): Interactive image
- SMILES: FC(F)(F)c1cccc(c1)C3(O)CCN(CCCC(=O)c2ccc(F)cc2)CC3
- InChI: InChI=1S/C22H23F4NO2/c23-19-8-6-16(7-9-19)20(28)5-2-12-27-13-10-21(29,11-14-27)17-3-1-4-18(15-17)22(24,25)26/h1,3-4,6-9,15,29H,2,5,10-14H2; Key:GPMXUUPHFNMNDH-UHFFFAOYSA-N

Trifluperidol is a typical antipsychotic of the butyrophenone chemical class. It has general properties similar to those of haloperidol, but is considerably more potent by weight, and causes relatively more severe side effects, especially tardive dyskinesia and other extrapyramidal effects. It is used in the treatment of psychoses including mania and schizophrenia. It was discovered at Janssen Pharmaceutica in 1959.

== Synthesis ==
Thieme Patent (claim 9): Precursor: Sila analogue:

The Grignard reaction between 1-benzyl-4-piperidone [3612-20-2] (1) and 3-bromobenzotrifluoride [401-78-5] (2) gives 1-benzyl-4-(3-(trifluoromethyl)phenyl)piperidin-4-ol, CID:12718203 (3). Catalytic hydrogenation removes the benzyl protecting group to give 4-[3-(trifluoromethyl)phenyl]-4-piperidinol [2249-28-7] (4). Alkylation with 4-Chloro-4'-fluorobutyrophenone [3874-54-2] (5) introduces the sidechain and hence completed the synthesis of Trifluperidol (6).

== See also ==
- Ocaperidone
