= Allobarbital =

Chemical compound and barbiturate

Clinical data
- Other names: 5,5-Diallylbarbituric acid, Diallylmalonylurea
- Routes of administration: parenteral
- Drug class: Barbiturate
- ATC code: N05CA21 (WHO)

Legal status
- Legal status: BR: Class B1 (Psychoactive drugs); CA: Schedule IV; DE: Anlage III (Special prescription form required); US: Schedule III

Identifiers
- IUPAC name: 5,5-di(prop-2-en-1-yl)-1,3-diazinane-2,4,6-trione
- CAS Number: 52-43-7
- PubChem CID: 5842
- ChemSpider: 5635
- UNII: 8NT43GG2HA
- KEGG: D02817
- ChEMBL: ChEMBL267719
- CompTox Dashboard (EPA): DTXSID9022572
- ECHA InfoCard: 100.000.129

Chemical and physical data
- Formula: C_{10}H_{12}N_{2}O_{3}
- Molar mass: 208.217 g·mol^{−1}
- 3D model (JSmol): Interactive image
- SMILES: O=C1NC(=O)NC(=O)C1(C\C=C)C\C=C
- InChI: InChI=1S/C10H12N2O3/c1-3-5-10(6-4-2)7(13)11-9(15)12-8(10)14/h3-4H,1-2,5-6H2,(H2,11,12,13,14,15); Key:FDQGNLOWMMVRQL-UHFFFAOYSA-N

Allobarbital, also spelt as allobarbitone and mainly branded as Dial, is a barbiturate derivative invented in 1912 by Ernst Preiswerk and Ernst Grether working for CIBA. It was used primarily as an anticonvulsant although it has now largely been replaced by newer drugs with improved safety profiles. Other uses for allobarbital included as an adjutant to boost the activity of analgesic drugs, and use in the treatment of insomnia and anxiety.

It was marketed Cibalgine' (in combination with aminophenazone), or Dial-Ciba (in combination with ethyl carbamate),

Relative as phenobarbital and secobarbital, althosaw more use in some European countries such as Bulgaria and Slovakia. In Poland, it was used until the 2010s, but only as compound.
