= Propiomazine =

Chemical compound

Clinical data
- Trade names: Propavan, others
- Other names: Propionylpromethazine; CB-1678; Wy-1359; NSC-169450
- AHFS/Drugs.com: Micromedex Detailed Consumer Information
- Routes of administration: Oral, IM, IV
- ATC code: N05CM06 (WHO)

Legal status
- Legal status: BR: Class C1 (Other controlled substances); US: ℞-only; EU: Rx-only; SE: Rx-only In general: Prescription only

Pharmacokinetic data
- Bioavailability: Oral: 33%
- Protein binding: 81%
- Metabolism: Hepatic like other phenothiazines
- Onset of action: 30-60 minutes
- Elimination half-life: 9 hours

Identifiers
- IUPAC name: 1-[10-(2-dimethylaminopropyl)-10H-phenothiazin-2-yl]propan-1-one
- CAS Number: 362-29-8
- PubChem CID: 4940
- IUPHAR/BPS: 7284
- DrugBank: DB00777
- ChemSpider: 4771
- UNII: 242Z0PM79Y
- KEGG: D02361
- ChEBI: CHEBI:8491
- ChEMBL: ChEMBL1201210
- CompTox Dashboard (EPA): DTXSID1023520
- ECHA InfoCard: 100.006.043

Chemical and physical data
- Formula: C_{20}H_{24}N_{2}OS
- Molar mass: 340.49 g·mol^{−1}
- 3D model (JSmol): Interactive image
- SMILES: O=C(c2cc1N(c3c(Sc1cc2)cccc3)CC(N(C)C)C)CC
- InChI: InChI=1S/C20H24N2OS/c1-5-18(23)15-10-11-20-17(12-15)22(13-14(2)21(3)4)16-8-6-7-9-19(16)24-20/h6-12,14H,5,13H2,1-4H3; Key:UVOIBTBFPOZKGP-UHFFFAOYSA-N

Propiomazine, sold under the brand name Propavan among others, is an antihistamine which is used to treat insomnia and to produce sedation and relieve anxiety before or during surgery or other procedures and in combination with analgesics as well as during labor. Propiomazine is a phenothiazine, but is not used therapeutically as a neuroleptic because it does not block dopamine receptors well.

== Medical uses ==
Propiomazine has been used in the treatment of insomnia.

== Side effects ==
Drowsiness is a usual side effect. Rare, serious side effects include convulsions (seizures); difficult or unusually fast breathing; fast or irregular heartbeat or pulse; fever (high); high or low blood pressure; loss of bladder control; muscle stiffness (severe); unusual increase in sweating; unusually pale skin; and unusual tiredness or weakness.

== Pharmacology ==
=== Pharmacodynamics ===
Propiomazine is an antagonist of the dopamine D_{1}, D_{2}, and D_{4} receptors, the serotonin 5-HT_{2A} and 5-HT_{2C} receptors, the muscarinic acetylcholine receptors M_{1}, M_{2}, M_{3}, M_{4}, and M_{5} receptors, α_{1}-adrenergic receptor, and histamine H_{1} receptor.

The antipsychotic effect of propiomazine is thought to be due to antagonism of the dopamine D_{2} receptor and serotonin 5-HT_{2A} receptor, with greater activity at the 5-HT_{2A} receptor than at the D_{2} receptor. This may explain the lack of extrapyramidal effects with propiomazine. Propiomazine does not appear to block dopamine within the tuberoinfundibular pathway, which may explain its lower incidence of hyperprolactinemia than with typical antipsychotics or risperidone.

== Chemistry ==
Propiomazine, also known as 10-(2-dimethylaminopropyl)-2-propionylphenothiazine or as propionylpromethazine, is a phenothiazine derivative and is structurally related to promethazine. The compound is provided medically as the hydrochloride and maleate salts.

== Society and culture ==
=== Brand names ===
Propiomazine has been sold under the brand names Dorevan, Dorévane, Indorm, Largon, Phenoctyl, Propavan, Propial, and Serentin.

=== Availability ===
In 2000, propiomazine continued to be marketed only in Sweden.
