= Barbiturate =

Class of depressant drugs derived from barbituric acid

Barbituric acid, the parent structure of all barbiturates

Barbiturates (Note: The most often cited standard pronunciation is /bɑːrˈbɪtjʊrɪt/ bar-BIT-yuu-rit; however, at least in the United States, the more commonly used colloquial pronunciation is /bɑːrˈbɪtʃuɪt/ bar-BIH-chew-it.) are a class of depressant drugs that are chemically derived from barbituric acid. They are effective when used medically as anxiolytics, hypnotics, and anticonvulsants, but have physical and psychological addiction potential as well as overdose potential among other possible adverse effects. They have been used recreationally for their anti-anxiety and sedative effects, and are thus controlled in most countries due to the risks associated with such use.

Barbiturates have largely been replaced by benzodiazepines and nonbenzodiazepines ("Z-drugs") in routine medical practice, particularly in the treatment of anxiety disorders and insomnia, because of the significantly lower risk of overdose, and the lack of an antidote for barbiturate overdose. Despite this, barbiturates are still in use for various purposes: in general anesthesia, epilepsy, treatment of acute migraines or cluster headaches, acute tension headaches, euthanasia, capital punishment, and assisted suicide.

== Uses ==
=== Medicine ===
Barbiturates, such as phenobarbital, were long used as anxiolytics and hypnotics. Intermediate-acting barbiturates reduce time to fall asleep, increase total sleep time, and reduce REM sleep time. Today they have been largely replaced by benzodiazepines for these purposes because the latter are less toxic in drug overdose. However, barbiturates are still used as anticonvulsants (e.g., phenobarbital and primidone).

Barbiturates in high doses are used for medical aid in dying. For example, in the United States, patients have been required to ingest 90 to 100 barbiturate pills by crushing them and mixing them into a sweet solvent, requiring antiemetics prior to ingestion to prevent vomiting. Barbiturates are also used in combination with a muscle relaxant for euthanasia and for capital punishment by lethal injection. Barbiturates are also frequently employed as euthanizing agents in small-animal veterinary medicine.

=== Interrogation ===
Sodium thiopental is an ultra-short-acting barbiturate that is marketed under the name Sodium Pentothal. It is often mistaken for "truth serum", or sodium amytal, an intermediate-acting barbiturate that is used for sedation and to treat insomnia, but was also used in so-called sodium amytal "interviews" where the person being questioned would incorrectly be thought to be more likely to provide the truth whilst under the influence of the drug. When dissolved in water, sodium amytal can be swallowed, or it can be administered by intravenous injection. The drug does not itself force people to tell the truth, but is thought to decrease inhibitions and slow creative thinking, making subjects more likely to be caught off guard when questioned, and increasing the possibility of the subject revealing information through emotional outbursts. Lying is somewhat more complex than telling the truth, especially under the influence of a sedative-hypnotic drug.

The memory-impairing effects and cognitive impairments induced by sodium thiopental are thought to reduce a subject's ability to invent and remember lies. This practice is no longer considered legally admissible in court, owing to findings that subjects undergoing such interrogations may form false memories, putting the reliability of all information obtained through such methods into question. Nonetheless, it is still employed in certain circumstances by defense and law enforcement agencies as a "humane" alternative to torture interrogation when the subject is believed to have information critical to the security of the state or agency employing the tactic.

=== Chemistry ===
In 1988, the synthesis and binding studies of an artificial receptor binding barbiturates by six complementary hydrogen bonds was published. Since this first article, different kind of receptors were designed, as well as different barbiturates and cyanurates, not for their efficiencies as drugs but for applications in supramolecular chemistry, in the conception of materials and molecular devices.

The preferred IUPAC name of the base compound, barbituric acid, is 1,3-diazinane-2,4,6-trione. Different barbiturates have different substituents in the basic structure, mainly in position 5 on the ring. Sodium barbital and barbital have also been used as pH buffers for biological research, e.g., in immuno-electrophoresis or in fixative solutions.

== Classification ==
Barbiturates are classified based on the duration of action. Examples of each class include:

- Ultra short acting (30 minutes): methohexitone, thiopentone
- Short acting (2 hours): cyclobarbitone, hexobarbitone, pentobarbitone, quinalbarbitone
- Intermediate acting (3–6 hours): amobarbitone, butabarbitone
- Long acting (6 hours): phenobarbitone

== Indications ==
Indications for the use of barbiturates include:

- Seizure
- Neonatal withdrawal syndrome
- Insomnia
- Anxiety
- Inducing anesthesia

== Side effects ==
Addiction experts in psychiatry, chemistry, pharmacology, forensic science, epidemiology, and the police and legal services engaged in delphic analysis regarding 20 popular recreational drugs. Barbiturates were ranked third in physical harm, fourth in social harm, and fifth in dependence.

There are special risks to consider for older adults, and women who are pregnant. When a person ages, the body becomes less able to rid itself of barbiturates. As a result, people over the age of 65 are at higher risk of experiencing the harmful effects of barbiturates, including drug dependence and accidental overdose. When barbiturates are taken during pregnancy, the drug passes through the placenta to the fetus. After the baby is born, it may experience withdrawal symptoms and have trouble breathing. In addition, nursing mothers who take barbiturates may transmit the drug to their babies through breast milk. A rare adverse reaction to barbiturates is Stevens–Johnson syndrome, which primarily affects the mucous membranes.

Common barbiturate side effects include nausea, hypotension, headache, drowsiness, and skin rash. More serious side effects can include confusion, slow breathing, hallucination, fainting, and coma. Rare side effects may include agranulocytosis, liver injury, megaloblastic anemia, or Stevens-Johnson Syndrome.

=== Tolerance and dependence ===
With regular use, tolerance to the effects of barbiturates develops. Research shows tolerance can develop with even one administration of a barbiturate. As with all GABAergic drugs, barbiturate withdrawal produces potentially fatal effects such as seizures, in a manner reminiscent of delirium tremens and benzodiazepine withdrawal although its more direct mechanism of GABA agonism makes barbiturate withdrawal even more severe than that of alcohol or benzodiazepines. It is considered one of the most dangerous withdrawals of any known addictive substance. Similarly to benzodiazepines, the longer acting barbiturates produce a less severe withdrawal syndrome than short acting and ultra-short acting barbiturates. Withdrawal symptoms are dose-dependent with heavier users being more affected than lower-dose addicts.

The pharmacological treatment of barbiturate withdrawal is an extended process often consisting of converting the patient to a long-acting benzodiazepine (i.e. Valium), followed by slowly tapering off the benzodiazepine. Mental cravings for barbiturates can last for months or years in some cases and counselling/support groups are highly encouraged by addiction specialists. Patients should never try to tackle the task of discontinuing barbiturates without consulting a doctor, owing to the high lethality and relatively sudden onset of the withdrawal. Attempting to quit "cold turkey" may result in neurological damage due to excitotoxicity, severe physical injuries received during convulsions, and even death resulting from arrhythmias during grande Mal seizures, paralleling death caused by delirium tremens.

=== Overdose ===
Some symptoms of an overdose typically include sluggishness, incoordination, difficulty in thinking, slowness of speech, faulty judgement, drowsiness, shallow breathing, staggering, and, in severe cases, coma or death. The lethal dosage of barbiturates varies greatly with tolerance and from one individual to another. The lethal dose is highly variable among different members of the class, with superpotent barbiturates such as pentobarbital being potentially fatal in considerably lower doses than the low-potency barbiturates such as butalbital. Even in inpatient settings, the development of tolerance is still a problem, as dangerous and unpleasant withdrawal symptoms can result when the drug is stopped after dependence has developed. Tolerance to the anxiolytic and sedative effects of barbiturates tends to develop faster than tolerance to their effects on smooth muscle, respiration, and heart rate, making them generally unsuitable for a long time psychiatric use. Tolerance to the anticonvulsant effects tends to correlate more with tolerance to physiological effects, however, meaning that they are still a viable option for long-term epilepsy treatment.

Barbiturates in overdose with other CNS (central nervous system) depressants (e.g. alcohol, opiates, benzodiazepines) are even more dangerous owing to additive CNS and respiratory depressant effects. In the case of benzodiazepines, not only do they have additive effects, barbiturates also increase the binding affinity of the benzodiazepine binding site, leading to exaggerated benzodiazepine effects. (ex. If a benzodiazepine increases the frequency of channel opening by 300%, and a barbiturate increases the duration of their opening by 300%, then the combined effects of the drugs increases the channels' overall function by 900%, not 600%).

The longest-acting barbiturates have half-lives of a day or more, and subsequently result in bioaccumulation of the drug in the system. The therapeutic and recreational effects of long-acting barbiturates wear off significantly faster than the drug can be eliminated, allowing the drug to reach toxic concentrations in the blood following repeated administration (even when taken at the therapeutic or prescribed dose) despite the user feeling little or no effects from the plasma-bound concentrations of the drug. Users who consume alcohol or other sedatives after the drug's effects have worn off, but before it has cleared the system, may experience a greatly exaggerated effect from the other sedatives which can be incapacitating or even fatal.

Barbiturates induce a number of hepatic CYP enzymes (most notably CYP2C9, CYP2C19, and CYP3A4), leading to exaggerated effects from many prodrugs and decreased effects from drugs which are metabolized by these enzymes to inactive metabolites. This can result in fatal overdoses from drugs such as codeine, tramadol, and carisoprodol, which become considerably more potent after being metabolized by CYP enzymes. Although all known members of the class possess relevant enzyme induction capabilities, the degree of induction overall as well as the impact on each specific enzyme span a broad range, with phenobarbital and secobarbital being the most potent enzyme inducers and butalbital and talbutal being among the weakest enzyme inducers in the class.

People who are known to have killed themselves by barbiturate overdose include Stefan Zweig, Charles Boyer, Ruan Lingyu, Dalida, Jeannine Deckers, Felix Hausdorff, Abbie Hoffman, Phyllis Hyman, Carole Landis, C. P. Ramanujam, George Sanders, Jean Seberg, Lupe Vélez and the members of Heaven's Gate cult. Others who have died as a result of barbiturate overdose include Pier Angeli, Brian Epstein, Judy Garland, Jimi Hendrix, Inger Stevens, Dinah Washington, Ellen Wilkinson, and Alan Wilson; in some cases these have been speculated to be suicides as well. Those who died of a combination of barbiturates and other drugs include Rainer Werner Fassbinder, Dorothy Kilgallen, Malcolm Lowry, Edie Sedgwick, Marilyn Monroe, and Kenneth Williams. Dorothy Dandridge died of either an overdose or an unrelated embolism. Ingeborg Bachmann may have died of the consequences of barbiturate withdrawal (she was hospitalized with burns, the doctors treating her were not aware of her barbiturate addiction).

== Contraindications ==
The use of Barbiturates is contraindicated in the following conditions:

- variegate porphyria (because of induction of enzymes needed for porphyria synthesis by barbiturates)
- Status asthmaticus (because of respiratory depression caused by the barbiturates)

== Mechanism of action ==
Barbiturates act as positive allosteric modulators and, at higher doses, as agonists of GABA_{A} receptors. GABA is the principal inhibitory neurotransmitter in the mammalian central nervous system (CNS). Barbiturates bind to the GABA_{A} receptor at multiple homologous transmembrane pockets located at subunit interfaces, which are binding sites distinct from GABA itself and also distinct from the benzodiazepine binding site. Like benzodiazepines, barbiturates potentiate the effect of GABA at this receptor. In addition to this GABAergic effect, barbiturates also block AMPA and kainate receptors, subtypes of ionotropic glutamate receptor. Glutamate is the principal excitatory neurotransmitter in the mammalian CNS. Taken together, the findings that barbiturates potentiate inhibitory GABA_{A} receptors and inhibit excitatory AMPA receptors can explain the superior CNS-depressant effects of these agents to alternative GABA potentiating agents such as benzodiazepines and quinazolinones. At higher concentration, they inhibit the Ca^{2+}-dependent release of neurotransmitters such as glutamate via an effect on P/Q-type voltage-dependent calcium channels. Barbiturates produce their pharmacological effects by increasing the duration of chloride ion channel opening at the GABA_{A} receptor (pharmacodynamics: This increases the efficacy of GABA), whereas benzodiazepines increase the frequency of the chloride ion channel opening at the GABA_{A} receptor (pharmacodynamics: This increases the potency of GABA). The direct gating or opening of the chloride ion channel is the reason for the increased toxicity of barbiturates compared to benzodiazepines in overdose.

Further, barbiturates are relatively non-selective compounds that bind to an entire superfamily of ligand-gated ion channels, of which the GABA_{A} receptor channel is only one of several representatives. This Cys-loop receptor superfamily of ion channels includes the neuronal nACh receptor channel, the 5-HT_{3} receptor channel, and the glycine receptor channel. However, while GABA_{A} receptor currents are increased by barbiturates (and other general anesthetics), ligand-gated ion channels that are predominantly permeable for cationic ions are blocked by these compounds. For example, neuronal nAChR channels are blocked by clinically relevant anesthetic concentrations of both thiopental and pentobarbital. Such findings implicate (non-GABA-ergic) ligand-gated ion channels, e.g. the neuronal nAChR channel, in mediating some of the (side) effects of barbiturates. This is the mechanism responsible for the (mild to moderate) anesthetic effect of barbiturates in high doses when used in anesthetic concentration.

== Interactions ==
Drug interactions with barbiturates are:

- Alcohol
- Opioids
- Benzodiazepines
- Anticoagulants
- Antihistamines
- Atazanavir
- Birth control
- Boceprevir

== Caution ==
Caution is needed in people using:

- Medications such as opioids or benzodiazepines
- Alcohol

Caution is also required in patients with:

- Asthma
- Kidney- or liver-problems
- Heart-disease
- Substance use disorder
- Depression
- History of suicidal thoughts

== History ==
Barbituric acid was first synthesized 27 November 1864, by German chemist Adolf von Baeyer, and later perfected in 1879 by the French chemist Edouard Grimaux, who developed and improved the synthesis. This was done by condensing urea with diethyl malonate. There are several stories about how the substance got its name. The most likely story is that Baeyer and his colleagues went to celebrate their discovery in a tavern where the town's artillery garrison were also celebrating the feast of Saint Barbara – the patron saint of artillerymen. An artillery officer is said to have christened the new substance by amalgamating Barbara with urea. Another story holds that Baeyer synthesized the substance from the collected urine of a Munich waitress named Barbara. No substance of medical value was discovered, however, until 1902 when two German scientists working at Bayer, Emil Fischer and Joseph von Mering, discovered that barbital was very effective in putting dogs to sleep. Barbital was then marketed by Bayer under the trade name Veronal. It is said that Mering proposed this name because the most peaceful place he knew was the Italian city of Verona. In 1912, Bayer introduced another barbituric acid derivative, phenobarbital, under the trade name Luminal, as a sedative–hypnotic.

It was not until the 1950s that the behavioral disturbances and physical dependence potential of barbiturates became recognized.

Since the 1970s, most barbiturates were replaced by benzodiazepines.

Barbituric acid itself does not have any direct effect on the central nervous system and chemists have derived over 2,500 compounds from it that possess pharmacologically active qualities. The broad class of barbiturates is further broken down and classified according to speed of onset and duration of action. Ultrashort-acting barbiturates are commonly used for anesthesia because their extremely short duration of action allows for greater control. These properties allow doctors to rapidly put a patient "under" in emergency surgery situations. Doctors can also bring a patient out of anesthesia just as quickly, should complications arise during surgery. The middle two classes of barbiturates are often combined under the title "short/intermediate-acting." These barbiturates are also employed for anesthetic purposes, and are also sometimes prescribed for anxiety or insomnia. This is not a common practice anymore, however, owing to the dangers of long-term use of barbiturates; they have been replaced by the benzodiazepines and Z-drug such as zolpidem, zaleplon and eszopiclone for sleep. The final class of barbiturates are known as long-acting barbiturates (the most notable one being phenobarbital, which has a half-life of roughly 92 hours). This class of barbiturates is used almost exclusively as anticonvulsants, although on rare occasions they are prescribed for daytime sedation. Barbiturates in this class are not used for insomnia, because, owing to their extremely long half-life, patients would awake with a residual "hang-over" effect and feel groggy.

Barbiturates can in most cases be used either as the free acid or as salts of sodium, calcium, potassium, magnesium, lithium, etc. Codeine- and dionine-based salts of barbituric acid have been developed.

== Society and culture ==
=== Legal status ===
During World War II, military personnel in the Pacific region were given "goofballs" to improve their tolerance of the heat and humidity of daily working conditions. Goofballs reduced the demand on the respiratory system, as well as maintaining blood pressure. Many soldiers returned with addictions that required several months of rehabilitation before discharge. This led to growing dependency problems, often exacerbated by indifferent physicians prescribing high doses to unknowing patients through the 1950s and 1960s. In the late 1950s and 1960s, published reports of barbiturate overdoses and dependence led to tighter drug policy in many countries.

==== Netherlands ====
In the Netherlands, the Opium Law classifies all barbiturates as List II drugs, with the exception of secobarbital, which is on List I.

There is a small group of List II drugs for which physicians have to write the prescriptions according to the same, tougher guidelines as those for List I drugs (writing the prescription in full in letters, listing the patients name, and have to contain the name and initials, address, city and telephone number of the licensed prescriber issuing the prescriptions, as well as the name and initials, address and city of the person the prescription is issued to). Among that group of drugs are the barbiturates amobarbital, butalbital, cyclobarbital, and pentobarbital.

=== United States ===
In the United States, the Controlled Substances Act of 1970 classified most barbiturates as controlled substances; Barbital, mephobarbital, and phenobarbital are designated schedule IV drugs. Additionally, and "Any substance which contains any quantity of a derivative of barbituric acid, or any salt of a derivative of barbituric acid" which includes the oxygenated, methylated, and brominated of compounds like enallylprypam) were designated as being schedule III. Under the original CSA, no barbiturates were placed in schedule I, II, or V; however, amobarbital, pentobarbital, and secobarbital are now schedule II controlled substances unless they are in a suppository dosage form.

In 1971, the Convention on Psychotropic Substances was signed in Vienna. Designed to regulate amphetamine and various synthetics compounds, the 34th version of the treaty regulates secobarbital as schedule II, amobarbital, butalbital, cyclobarbital, and pentobarbital as schedule III, and allobarbital, barbital, butobarbital, mephobarbital, phenobarbital, butabarbital, and vinylbital as schedule IV on its "Green List". The combination medication Fioricet, consisting of butalbital, caffeine, and paracetamol (acetaminophen), however, is specifically exempted from controlled substance status, while its sibling Fiorinal, which contains aspirin instead of paracetamol and may contain codeine phosphate, remains a schedule III drug.

=== Recreational use ===
Recreational users report that a barbiturate high gives them feelings of relaxed contentment and euphoria. Physical and psychological dependence may also develop with repeated use. Chronic misuse of barbiturates is associated with significant morbidity. One study found that 11% of males and 23% of females with a sedative-hypnotic misuse die by suicide. Other effects of barbiturate intoxication include drowsiness, lateral and vertical nystagmus, slurred speech and ataxia, decreased anxiety, and loss of inhibitions. Barbiturates are also used to alleviate the adverse or withdrawal effects of illicit drug use, in a manner similar to long-acting benzodiazepines such as diazepam and clonazepam. Often polysubstance use occurs and barbiturates are consumed with or substituted by other available substances, most commonly alcohol.

People who use substances tend to prefer short-acting and intermediate-acting barbiturates. The most commonly used are amobarbital (Amytal), pentobarbital (Nembutal), and secobarbital (Seconal). A combination of amobarbital and secobarbital (called Tuinal) is also highly used. Short-acting and intermediate-acting barbiturates are usually prescribed as sedatives and sleeping pills. These pills begin acting fifteen to forty minutes after they are swallowed, and their effects last from five to six hours.

Slang terms for barbiturates include barbs, barbies, bluebirds, dolls, wallbangers, yellows, downers, goofballs, sleepers, 'reds & blues', and tooties.

== Examples ==
Generic structure of a barbiturate, including numbering scheme

Barbiturates
Short name	R^{1}	R^{2}	IUPAC name	Duration of action
allobarbital	CH_{2}CHCH_{2}	CH_{2}CHCH_{2}	5,5-diallylbarbiturate	Short-acting
amobarbital	CH_{2}CH_{3}	(CH_{2})_{2}CH(CH_{3})_{2}	5-ethyl-5-isopentyl-barbiturate	Intermediate-acting
aprobarbital	CH_{2}CHCH_{2}	CH(CH_{3})_{2}	5-allyl-5-isopropyl-barbiturate	Intermediate-acting
alphenal	CH_{2}CHCH_{2}	C_{6}H_{5}	5-allyl-5-phenyl-barbiturate	Intermediate-acting
barbital	CH_{2}CH_{3}	CH_{2}CH_{3}	5,5-diethylbarbiturate	Long-acting
brallobarbital	CH_{2}CHCH_{2}	CH_{2}CBrCH_{2}	5-allyl-5-(2-bromo-allyl)-barbiturate	Short-acting
pentobarbital	CH_{2}CH_{3}	CH CH_{3}(CH_{2})_{2}CH_{3}	5-ethyl-5-(1-methylbutyl)-barbiturate	Short-acting
phenobarbital	CH_{2}CH_{3}	C_{6}H_{5}	5-ethyl-5-phenylbarbiturate	Long-acting
primidone	CH_{2}CH_{3}	C_{6}H_{5}	5-ethyl-5-phenyl-1,3-diazinane-4,6-dione (it lacks oxygen at #2 position of generic barbiturate structure)	Long-acting
secobarbital	CH_{2}CHCH_{2}	CHCH_{3}(CH_{2})_{2}CH_{3}	5-[(2R)-pentan-2-yl]-5-prop-2-enyl-barbiturate; 5-allyl-5-[(2R)-pentan-2-yl]-barbiturate	Short-acting
thiopental	CH_{2}CH_{3}	CHCH_{3}(CH_{2})_{2}CH_{3}	5-ethyl-5-(1-methylbutyl)-2-thiobarbiturate (the oxygen at #2 position is replaced by a sulfur)	Ultrashort-acting

Thiopental is a barbiturate with one of the C=O double bonds (with the carbon being labelled 2 in the adjacent diagram) replaced with a C=S double bond, R^{1} being CH_{2}CH_{3} (ethyl) and R3) being CH(CH_{3})CH_{2}CH_{2}CH_{3} (sec-pentyl). Thiopental is no longer available in the United States.

== See also ==
- Benzodiazepine
- Psycholeptic
- Dille–Koppanyi reagent, Zwikker reagent, and other spot tests for barbiturates

== External links and further reading ==
- López-Muñoz, F.; Ucha-Udabe, R.; Alamo, C. (2005). "The history of barbiturates a century after their clinical introduction". Neuropsychiatric Disease and Treatment. 1 (4): 329–343. PMC 2424120. PMID 18568113.
