= Phenothiazine =

Chemical compound

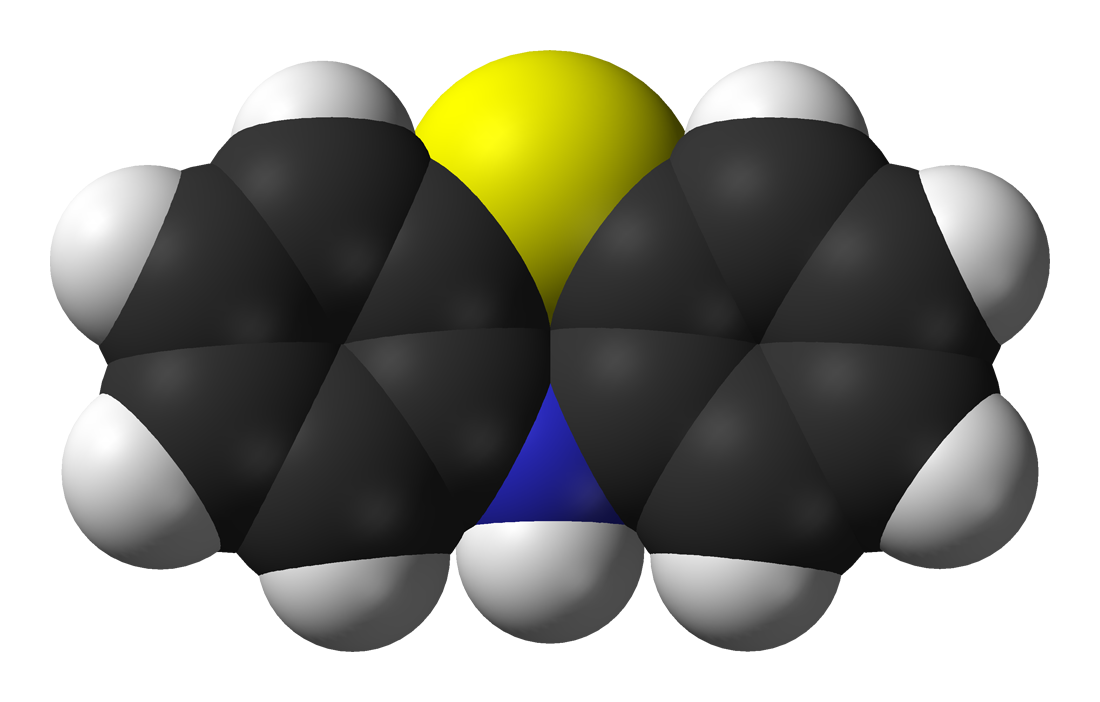

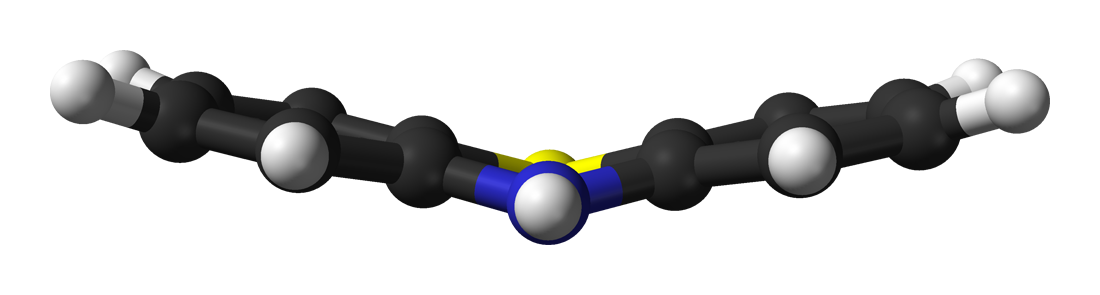

Names
- Preferred IUPAC name 10H-Phenothiazine
- Other names Thiodiphenylamine; Dibenzothiazine; Dibenzoparathiazine; 10H-dibenzo-[b,e]-1,4-thiazine; PTZ

Identifiers
CAS Number	92-84-2
3D model (JSmol)	Interactive image
Beilstein Reference	143237
ChEBI	CHEBI:37931
ChEMBL	ChEMBL828
ChemSpider	21106365
ECHA InfoCard	100.001.997
EC Number	202-196-5
KEGG	D02601
PubChem CID	7108
RTECS number	SN5075000
UNII	GS9EX7QNU6
CompTox Dashboard (EPA)	DTXSID5021126
- InChI: InChI=1S/C12H9NS/c1-3-7-11-9(5-1)13-10-6-2-4-8-12(10)14-11/h1-8,13H Key: WJFKNYWRSNBZNX-UHFFFAOYSA-N; InChI=1/C12H9NS/c1-3-7-11-9(5-1)13-10-6-2-4-8-12(10)14-11/h1-8,13H Key: WJFKNYWRSNBZNX-UHFFFAOYAI
- SMILES: c1ccc2c(c1)Nc3ccccc3S2

Properties
Chemical formula	C_{12}H_{9}NS
Molar mass	199.27 g/mol
Appearance	greenish-yellow rhombic leaflets or diamond-shaped plates
Melting point	185 °C (365 °F; 458 K)
Boiling point	371 °C (700 °F; 644 K)
Solubility in water	0.00051 g/L (20 °C)
Solubility in other solvents	benzene, ether, petroleum ether, chloroform, hot acetic acid, ethanol (slightly), mineral oil (slightly)
Acidity (pK_{a})	approx 23 in DMSO
Magnetic susceptibility (χ)	−114.8·10^{−6} cm^{3}/mol

Hazards
- GHS labelling
Pictograms	(GHS07: Exclamation mark) (GHS08: Health hazard)
Signal word	Warning
Hazard statements	H302, H317, H373, H412
Precautionary statements	P260, P264, P270, P272, P273, P280, P301+P312, P302+P352, P314, P321, P330, P333+P313, P363, P501
- NIOSH (US health exposure limits)
PEL (Permissible)	none
REL (Recommended)	TWA 5 mg/m^{3} [skin]
IDLH (Immediate danger)	N.D.

Pharmacology
ATCvet code	QP52AX03 (WHO)
- Except where otherwise noted, data are given for materials in their standard state (at 25 °C [77 °F], 100 kPa). verify (what is ?) Infobox references

Phenothiazine, abbreviated PTZ, is an organic compound that has the formula S(C_{6}H_{4})_{2}NH and is related to the thiazine-class of heterocyclic compounds. Derivatives of phenothiazine are highly bioactive and have widespread use.

The derivatives chlorpromazine and promethazine revolutionized the fields of psychiatry and allergy treatment, respectively. An earlier derivative, methylene blue, was one of the first antimalarial drugs, and derivatives of phenothiazine are currently under investigation as possible anti-infective drugs. Phenothiazine is a prototypical pharmaceutical lead structure in medicinal chemistry.

== Uses ==
Phenothiazine itself is only of theoretical interest, but derivatives of it revolutionized psychiatry, other fields of medicine, and pest management. Other derivatives have been studied for possible use in advanced batteries and fuel cells.

=== Phenothiazine-derived drugs ===
In 1876, methylene blue, a derivative of phenothiazine, was synthesized by Heinrich Caro at BASF. The structure was deduced in 1885 by Heinrich August Bernthsen. Bernthsen synthesized phenothiazine in 1883. In the mid 1880s, Paul Ehrlich began to use methylene blue in his cell staining experiments that led to pioneering discoveries about different cell types. He was awarded a Nobel Prize based in part on that work. He became particularly interested in its use to stain bacteria and parasites such as Plasmodiidae – the genus that includes the malaria pathogen – and found that it could be stained with methylene blue. He thought methylene blue could possibly be used in the treatment of malaria, tested it clinically, and by the 1890s methylene blue was being used for that purpose.

For the next several decades, research on derivatives lapsed until phenothiazine itself came to market as an insecticide and deworming drug. In the 1940s, chemists working with Paul Charpentier at Rhone-Poulenc Laboratories in Paris (a precursor company to Sanofi), began making derivatives. This work led to promethazine which had no activity against infective organisms, but did have good antihistamine activity, with a strong sedative effect. It is still marketed as a drug for allergies and for anesthesia. At the end of the 1940s the same lab produced chlorpromazine which had an even stronger sedative and soothing effect, and Jean Delay and Pierre Deniker attempted to use it on their psychiatric patients, publishing their results in the early 1950s. The strong effects they found opened the door of the modern field of psychiatry and led to a proliferation of work on phenothiazine derivatives. The systematic research conducted by chemists to explore phenothiazine derivatives and their activity was a pioneering example of medicinal chemistry; phenothiazine is often discussed as a prototypical example of a pharmaceutical lead structure.

A number of phenothiazines other than methylene blue have been shown to have antimicrobial effects. In particular, thioridazine has been shown to make extensively drug-resistant tuberculosis (XDR-TB) drug-susceptible again and make methicillin-resistant Staphylococcus aureus (MRSA) susceptible to beta-lactam antibiotics. The major reason why thioridazine has not been utilized as an antimicrobial agent is due to adverse effects on the central nervous system and cardiovascular system (particularly QT interval prolongation).

The term "phenothiazines" describes the largest of the five main classes of antipsychotic drugs. These drugs have antipsychotic and, often, antiemetic properties, although they may also cause severe side effects such as extrapyramidal symptoms (including akathisia and tardive dyskinesia), hyperprolactinaemia, and the rare but potentially fatal neuroleptic malignant syndrome, as well as substantial weight gain. Use of phenothiazines has been associated with antiphospholipid syndrome, but no causal relationship has been established.

Phenothiazine antipsychotics are classified into three groups that differ with respect to the substituent on nitrogen: the aliphatic compounds (bearing acyclic groups), the "piperidines" (bearing piperidine-derived groups), and the piperazine (bearing piperazine-derived substituents).

Group	Anticholinergic	Example	Sedation	Extrapyramidal side effects
Aliphatic compounds	moderate	Chlorpromazine (marketed as Thorazine, Aminazine, Chlor-PZ, Klorazine, Promachlor, Promapar, Sonazine, Chlorprom, Chlor-Promanyl, Largactil)	strong	moderate
Aliphatic compounds	moderate	Promazine (trade name Sparine, Propazine)	moderate	moderate
Aliphatic compounds	moderate	Triflupromazine (trade names Clinazine, Novaflurazine, Pentazine, Triflurin, Vesprin)	strong	moderate/strong
Aliphatic compounds	moderate	Levomepromazine in Germany, Russia, most American countries (e.g., Brazil) and methotrimeprazine in USA (trade names Nozinan, Levoprome, Tisercin)	extremely strong	low
Piperidines	strong	Mesoridazine (trade name Serentil)	strong	weak
Piperidines	strong	Thioridazine (trade names Mellaril, Novoridazine, Thioril, Sonapax)	strong	weak
Piperazines	weak	Fluphenazine (trade names Prolixin, Permitil, Modecate, Moditen)	weak/moderate	strong
Piperazines	weak	Perphenazine (sold as Trilafon, Etrafon, Triavil, Phenazine, Etaperazin)	weak/moderate	strong
Piperazines	weak	Prochlorperazine (trade names Compazine, Stemetil)		
Piperazines	weak	Trifluoperazine (trade name Stelazine, Triphtazine)	moderate	strong

=== Nondrug applications ===
The synthetic dye methylene blue, containing the structure, was described in 1876. Many water-soluble phenothiazine derivatives, such as methylene blue, methylene green, thionine, and others, can be electropolymerized into conductive polymers used as electrocatalysts for NADH oxidation in enzymatic biosensors and biofuel cells.

Phenothiazine is used as an anaerobic polymerization inhibitor for acrylic acid, often used as an in-process inhibitor during the purification of acrylic acid.

== Trade names ==
Like many commercially significant compounds, phenothiazine has numerous trade names, including AFI-Tiazin, Agrazine, Antiverm, Biverm, Dibenzothiazine, Orimon, Lethelmin, Souframine, Nemazene, Vermitin, Padophene, Fenoverm, Fentiazine, Contaverm, Fenothiazine, Phenovarm, Ieeno, ENT 38, Helmetina, Helmetine, Penthazine, XL-50, Wurm-thional, Phenegic, Phenovis, Phenoxur, and Reconox.

== Former uses ==
Phenothiazine was formerly used as an insecticide and as a drug to treat infections with parasitic worms (anthelminthic) in livestock and people, but its use for those purposes has been superseded by other chemicals.

Phenothiazine was introduced by DuPont as an insecticide in 1935. About 3,500,000 pounds were sold in the US in 1944. However, because it was degraded by sunlight and air, it was difficult to determine how much to use in the field, and its use waned in the 1940s with the arrival of new pesticides like DDT that were more durable. As of July 2015 it is not registered for pesticide use in the US, Europe, or Australia.

=== As an anthelminthic ===
It was introduced as anthelminthic in livestock in 1940 and is considered, with thiabendazole, to be the first modern anthelminthic. The first instances of resistance were noted in 1961. Among anthelmintics, Blizzard et al. 1990 found only paraherquamide to have similar activity to phenothiazine. It is possible that they share the same mode of action. Uses for this purpose in the US are still described but it has "virtually disappeared from the market."

In the 1940s it also was introduced as anthelminthic for humans; since it was often given to children, the drug was often sold in chocolate, leading to the popular name, "worm chocolate." Phenothiazine was superseded by other drugs in the 1950s.

== Structure and synthesis ==
The central C_{4}SN ring is folded in phenothiazines.

The compound was originally prepared by Bernthsen in 1883 via the reaction of diphenylamine with sulfur, but more recent syntheses rely on the cyclization of 2-substituted diphenyl sulfides. Few pharmaceutically significant phenothiazines are prepared from phenothiazine, although some of them are.

Phenothiazines are electron donors, forming charge-transfer salts with many acceptors.
