= List of drugs: C–Ca =

This multi-page article lists pharmaceutical drugs alphabetically by name. Many drugs have more than one name and, therefore, the same drug may be listed more than once. Brand names and generic names are differentiated by capitalizing brand names.

See also the list of the top 100 bestselling branded drugs, ranked by sales.

Abbreviations are used in the list as follows:

- INN = International nonproprietary name
- BAN = British Approved Name
- USAN = United States Adopted Name
- Two-letter codes for countries

Lists of drugs
1–9 | A | B | C | D | E | F | G | H | I | J | K | L | M | N | O | P | Q | R | S | T | U | V | W | X | Y | Z

Ca | Cb–Ce | Cf–Ch | Ci | Cj–Cl | Cm–Co | Cp–Cz

== c ==
- C-500-GR
- C-Crystals
- C-Gram
- C-Phed Tannate
- C-Solve-2
- c1 esterase inhibitor
- C2B8 monoclonal antibody
- c7E3
- C8-CCK

== ca ==
=== cab-caf ===
- Ca-DTPA
- cabastine (INN)
- cabazitaxel (INN, USAN)
- Cabenuva
- cabergoline (INN)
- cabiotraxetan (INN)
- Cablivi
- Cabometyx
- cabotegravir
- cabozantinib (USAN, INN)
- Cabtreo
- cactinomycin (INN)
- cadazolid (INN)
- cadexomer (INN)
- Cadivast
- cadralazine (INN)
- Caduet
- Caelyx
- cafaminol (INN)
- Cafcit
- cafedrine (INN)
- Cafergot
- Cafetrate
- caffeine

=== cal ===
- Cal Carb-HD
- Cal-Citrate 250
- Cal-G
- Cal-Gest
- Cal-Lac
- Cal-Mint
- Cal-Plus

==== cala-calb ====
- Caladryl Spray
- Calan
- calaspargase pegol (USAN, INN)
- Calbon

==== calc ====
===== calca =====
- Calcarb 600

===== calci =====
- Calci-Chew
- Calci-Mix

====== calcib-calcit ======
- Calcibind
- Calciday-667
- calcifediol (INN)
- calciferol
- Calcijex
- Calcimar
- Calcionate
- Calciparine
- calcipotriene (INN)
- calcipotriol (INN)
- Calciquid
- calcitonin, bovine (INN)
- calcitonin, chicken (INN)
- calcitonin, eel (INN)
- calcitonin, human (INN)
- calcitonin, porcine (INN)
- calcitonin, rat (INN)
- calcitonin, salmon (INN)
- calcitonin (INN)
- calcitriol (INN)

====== calciu ======
- calcium benzamidosalicylate (INN)
- calcium clofibrate (INN)
- calcium disodium versenate
- calcium dobesilate (INN)
- calcium folinate (INN)
- calcium glubionate (INN)
- calcium glucoheptonate (INN)
- calcium levofolinate (INN)
- calcium pantothenate (INN)
- calcium saccharate (INN)
- calcium sodium ferriclate (INN)
- calcium trisodium pentetate (INN)

==== cald-calu ====
- CaldeCORT
- Calderol
- caldiamide (INN)
- Caldolor
- calfactant
- Calfort
- Calmurid HC
- CaloMist
- Calquence
- calteridol (INN)
- calusterone (INN)

=== cam ===
- Cam-Ap-Es
- Cam-Metrazine
- camazepam (INN)
- cambendazole (INN)
- Cambia
- Camcevi
- Camcevi Etm
- camiglibose (INN)
- Camila
- camiverine (INN)
- camizestrant (USAN, INN)
- camobucol (USAN, INN)
- camonagrel (INN)
- Camoquin
- camostat (INN)
- Campath (Millennium and ILEX Partners, LP)
- Campho-Phenique
- camphotamide (INN)
- Camptosar
- Camptosar (Pharmacia & Upjohn Company)
- Camrese
- camylofin (INN)

=== can ===
- canagliflozin (USAN)
- canakinumab (INN)
- Canasa
- canbisol (INN)
- Cancidas
- candesartan (INN)
- Candex
- candicidin (INN)
- Candistatin
- candocuronium iodide (INN)
- candoxatril (INN)
- candoxatrilat (INN)
- canertinib (USAN)
- canfosfamide (USAN)
- cangrelor (USAN)
- Cankaid
- cannabidiol
- cannabinol (INN)
- cannabis
- canosimibe (INN)
- canrenoic acid (INN)
- canrenone (INN)
- Cantharone
- Cantil
- cantuzumab mertansine (INN)
- cantuzumab ravtansine (USAN, INN)

=== cap ===
- Cap-Profen
- capadenoson (INN)
- Capastat
- capecitabine (INN)
- capeserod (INN)
- Capital with codeine
- Capitrol
- capivasertib (INN)
- caplacizumab-yhdp
- Caplyta
- capmatinib
- capobenic acid (INN)
- Capoten
- Capozide
- Caprelsa
- capreomycin (INN)
- capromab pendetide (INN)
- capromorelin (INN)
- caproxamine (INN)
- caprylidene
- Capsagel
- capsaicin
- captodiame (INN)
- Captohexal (Hexal Australia) [Au], also known as captopril
- captopril (INN)
- capuride (INN)
- Capvaxive
- Capzasin-HP

=== car ===
==== cara ====
- carabersat (INN)
- Carac
- caracemide (INN)
- Carafate
- carafiban (INN)
- caramiphen (INN)
- carazolol (INN)

==== carb ====
===== carba-carbe =====
- carbachol (INN)
- carbadox (INN)
- Carbaglu
- carbaldrate (INN)
- carbamazepine (INN)
- carbamide peroxide
- carbantel (INN)
- carbaril (INN)
- carbarsone (INN)
- carbasalate calcium (INN)
- Carbastat
- Carbatrol
- Carbaxefed RF
- carbazeran (INN)
- carbazochrome salicylate (INN)
- carbazochrome sodium sulfonate (INN)
- carbazochrome (INN)
- carbazocine (INN)
- carbenicillin (INN)
- carbenoxolone (INN)
- carbenzide (INN)
- carbetapentane
- carbetapentane tannate
- carbetimer (INN)
- carbetocin (INN)

===== carbi-carbu =====
- carbidopa (INN)
- carbifene (INN)
- carbimazole (INN)
- carbinoxamine (INN)
- Carbiset Tablet
- Carbocaine with Neo-Cobefrin
- Carbocaine
- carbocisteine (INN)
- carbocloral (INN)
- carbocromen (INN)
- Carbodec Syrup
- carbofenotion (INN)
- Carbolith
- carbomycin (INN)
- carbon monoxide (USAN)
- carboplatin (INN)
- carboprost (INN)
- Carboptic
- carboquone (INN)
- carbromal (INN)
- carbubarb (INN)
- carburazepam (INN)
- carbutamide (INN)
- carbuterol (INN)

==== carc-carl ====
- carcainium chloride (INN)
- Cardamyst
- Cardem
- Cardene
- Cardinorm (Hexal Australia) [Au], also known as amiodarone
- Cardio-Green
- Cardiogen-82
- Cardiografin
- Cardiolite
- Cardioplegic
- Cardioquin
- Cardiotec
- Cardizem
- Cardizem CD
- Cardizem LA
- Cardrase
- Cardura
- Cardura XL
- carebastine (INN)
- carfecillin (INN)
- carfenazine (INN)
- carfentanil (INN)
- carfilzomib (USAN, INN)
- carfimate (INN)
- carglumic acid (USAN)
- cargutocin (INN)
- caricotamide (INN)
- Carimune
- carindacillin (INN)
- cariporide (INN)
- cariprazine (INN, (USAN)
- carisbamate (USAN)
- carisoprodol (INN)
- carlecortemcel-L (USAN)
- carlumab (USAN, INN)

==== carm-cars ====
- carmantadine (INN)
- carmegliptin (USAN, INN)
- carmellose (INN)
- carmetizide (INN)
- carmofur (INN)
- Carmol HC
- Carmol 10
- Carmol 20
- Carmol 40
- Carmol HC
- carmoxirole (INN)
- carmustine (INN)
- Carnation Instant Breakfast
- Carnexiv
- carnidazole (INN)
- carnitine (INN)
- Carnitor
- carocainide (INN)
- Carofenvet
- Caroid
- Carospir
- carotegrast (INN)
- caroverine (INN)
- caroxazone (INN)
- carperidine (INN)
- carperitide (INN)
- carperone (INN)
- carpindolol (INN)
- carpipramine (INN)
- carprazidil (INN)
- carprofen (INN)
- carpronium chloride (INN)
- Carrington Antifungal
- carsalam (INN)
- carsatrin (INN)

==== cart-carz ====
- cartasteine (INN)
- cartazolate (INN)
- Carteolol
- carteolol (INN)
- Cartia XT
- Carticel
- Cartrol
- carubicin (INN)
- carumonam (INN)
- carvedilol (INN)
- carvotroline (INN)
- Carvykti
- carzelesin (INN)
- carzenide (INN)

=== cas-cav ===
- Casgevy
- casimersen
- casirivimab and imdevimab
- Casodex
- casokefamide (INN)
- casopitant (USAN, INN)
- caspofungin (INN)
- Casporyn
- Cassipa
- Castellani paint
- Cataflam
- Catapres
- Catapres-TTS
- Catarase
- Cathflo Activase
- cathine (INN)
- cathinone (INN)
- Catiolanze
- catramilast (USAN, INN)
- catridecacog (INN)
- catumaxomab (INN)
- Caverject
- Cayston
