= C25H30N2O4 =

The molecular formula C_{25}H_{30}N_{2}O_{4} may refer to:

- Iptacopan
- 4,4′-Methylenebis(N,N-diglycidylaniline)
