= Sucrose lysis test =

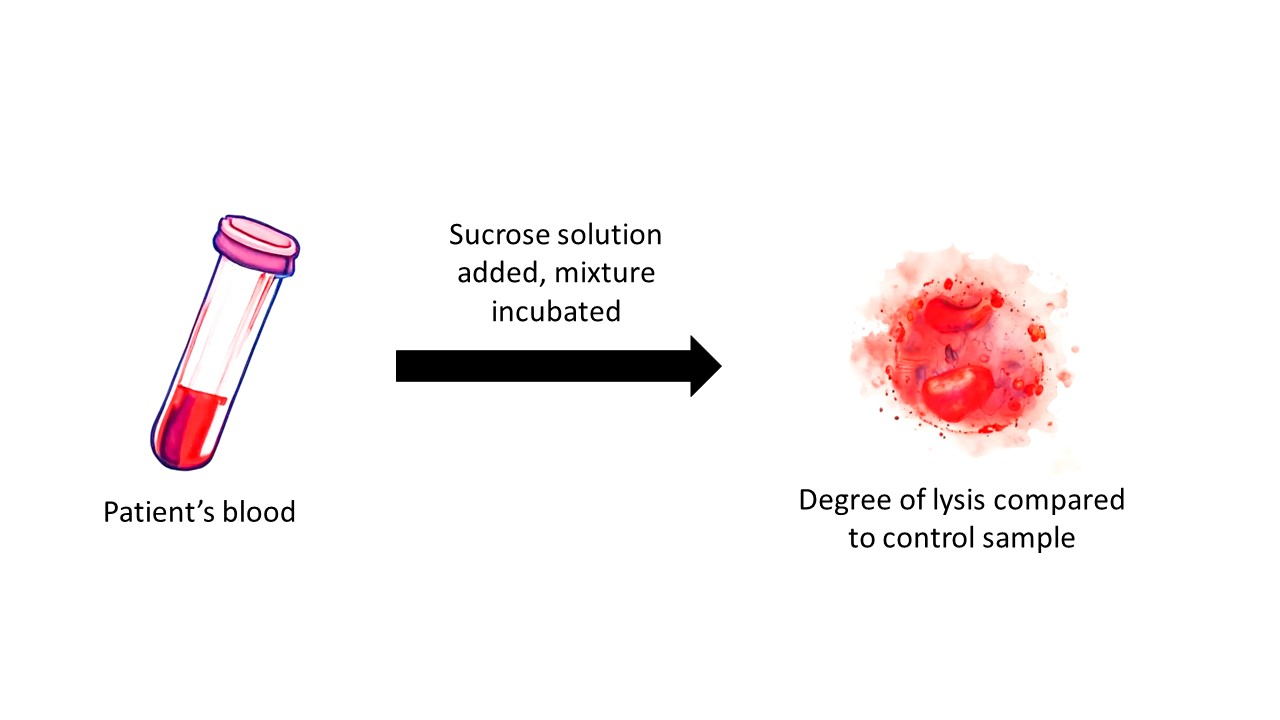
- Synonyms: Sucrose hemolysis test
- Purpose: screening and diagnosis of paroxysmal nocturnal hemoglobinuria

The sucrose lysis test is a diagnostic laboratory test used for diagnosing paroxysmal nocturnal hemoglobinuria (PNH), as well as for hypoplastic anemias and any hemolytic anemia with an unclear cause. The test works by using sucrose, which creates a low ionic strength environment that allows complement to bind to red blood cells. In individuals with PNH, some red blood cells are especially vulnerable to lysis caused by complement. The test may also produce suspicious results in other hematologic conditions, including megaloblastic anemia and autoimmune hemolytic anemia. False-negative results can occur when complement activity is absent in the serum. A simpler alternative called the sugar water test also involves mixing blood with sugar and observing for hemolysis, using the same principle as the sucrose lysis test.

== History ==
The sucrose hemolysis test was developed in the 1960s. Hartmann and Jenkins first described the test in 1966. The test was devised as a superior screen for PNH compared to the Ham's acid hemolysis test (HT) that was developed in the 1930s. For decades, these two tests were the primary methods of diagnosing PNH. The test is now obsolete being replaced by more advanced methods such as flow cytometry with monoclonal antibodies CD55/CD59 that target glycosylphosphatidylinositol-anchored proteins (GPI-AP) with the addition of inactivated fluorescently labeled bacterial toxins, such as fluorescently labeled aerolysin (FLAER). Flow cytometry is the most sensitive and useful assay currently available to screen and diagnosis PNH.

== Description ==
The sucrose lysis test uses an isotonic sucrose solution to lower the ionic strength of serum, which triggers the activation of the classic complement pathway, leading to the lysis of cells that are sensitive to complement.

In the sucrose lysis test, patient RBCs are washed and resuspended in a buffered sucrose solution. The solution is then incubated at a set temperature for a specified period, during which complement-mediated lysis occurs. After incubation, the solution is centrifuged, and the amount of hemoglobin released is measured spectrophotometrically. The degree of lysis is compared to that of control samples.

Although more sensitive than the Ham test, it is not as specific since some RBCs hemolyze to a minor degree in autoimmune hemolytic anemias, leukemia, and aplastic anemia. Although affordable and straightforward to perform, the test is more labor-intensive because PNH RBCs have a short half-life in circulation.

== Diagnosis ==
After one hour of incubation at 25 °C, greater than 5% of red blood cells demonstrating lysis is positive for PNH.
