= Exercise-induced pulmonary hemorrhage =

Ruptured lung capillaries, mainly in horses

Exercise-induced pulmonary hemorrhage (EIPH), also known as "bleeding" or a "bleeding attack", is the presence of blood in the airways of the lung in association with exercise. EIPH is common in horses undertaking intense exercise, but it has also been reported in human athletes, racing camels and racing greyhounds. Horses that experience EIPH may also be referred to as "bleeders" or as having "broken a blood vessel". In the majority of cases, EIPH is not apparent unless an endoscopic examination of the airways is performed following exercise. This is distinguished from other forms of bleeding from the nostrils, called epistaxis.

== Epidemiology ==
EIPH often occurs in horses that race at high speeds, with the number of affected race horses increasing in proportion to the speed and intensity of the exercise. It may occur in racing Thoroughbreds (flat racing, steeplechasing or jump racing), American Quarter Horses (incidence of 50–75%), Standardbreds (incidence of 40–60%), Arabians, and Appaloosas. EIPH also occurs in eventers, jumpers, polo ponies, endurance horses, draft horses that pull competitively, and horses taking part in Western speed events such as barrel racing, reining and cutting. It is rare in endurance horses or draft breeds.

The lowest intensities of exercise which may cause EIPH are intense trotting (40–60% maximal oxygen uptake) and cantering at speeds of 16–19 miles per hour (26–31 km/h).

EIPH occurs less frequently in stallions than mares or geldings.

=== Prevalence ===
Approximately 43 to 75% of horses have blood in the trachea and bronchi following a single post-race endoscopic examination. In one study, all horses endoscoped on at least three separate occasions following racing had EIPH at least once.

Epistaxis (blood coming from one or both nostrils) is much less common, occurring in 0.25–13% of cases. In a survey of over 220,000 horse starts in UK Flat and National Hunt (jump) racing, 185 cases of epistaxis were identified (0.83 per 1000 starts). Similar frequencies have been reported in Japan (1.5 per 1000 starts) and South Africa (1.65 per 1000 starts), whereas a higher frequency has been reported in Korean (8.4 per 1000 starts).

== Clinical signs ==
Unless a horse has severe EIPH, with blood present at the nostrils (known as epistaxis), the main sign is usually poor athletic performance; other signs are generally subtle and not easy to detect. Frequent swallowing and coughing in the immediate post-exercise recovery period, and poor appetite post-performance may be suggestive of EIPH. A definitive diagnosis can only be made by endoscopic examination of the trachea. In the case where no blood is visible in the trachea, EIPH in the small airways may still be present and can be confirmed by a bronchoalveolar lavage. Impaired arterial blood gas (oxygen) tensions during intense exercise, increased blood lactate, and rarely death have been noted (likely due to ruptured chordae tendinae or a different mechanism of lung hemorrhage). Epistaxis is diagnosed when blood is visible at either or both nostrils during or following exercise. To confirm whether the blood is coming from the upper or lower airway requires further examination by endoscopy, although in some cases it is not possible to determine the location. In the majority of epistaxis cases, the blood originates from the lung. Epistaxis during or following exercise can less commonly occur as a result of upper airway hemorrhage, for example following head trauma, subepiglottic cysts, atrial fibrillation, or guttural pouch mycoses.

=== Effects on performance ===
EIPH reduces a horse's racing performance. Severe EIPH (epistaxis) shortens a horse's racing career. Moderate to severe EIPH is associated with a worsened finishing position in a race, and finishing farther behind the winner. Horses with mild EIPH earn more prize money than those with more severe EIPH. While single bouts of EIPH may not even be apparent to the rider, owner or trainer of a horse unless an endoscopic examination is undertaken, the effect on performance within a single race appears to be significant but relatively subtle. In a 2005 study, horses finishing races with grade 4 EIPH were on average 6 metres behind those finishing with grade 0. However, the effect of repeated bouts of EIPH that occur with daily training may lead to more significant changes and a greater degree of tissue damage over time with consequent loss of lung function.

== Diagnosis ==
As only one in ten cases of EIPH have epistaxis (bleeding from the nostrils), and as epistaxis can have causes other than EIPH, various diagnostic tools are used to diagnose EIPH.

=== Endoscopy ===
EIPH is most commonly diagnosed by endoscopic examination of the trachea and larger bronchi, with the optimal timing for endoscopy being 60–90 minutes after hard exercise. This post-exercise delay allows time for blood within the lungs to travel to the trachea. Blood can usually be detected in the trachea or bronchi for 1–3 days after an episode of EIPH, but may be present for up to a week. The amount of blood visible in the trachea at the time of examination is most commonly graded on a scale of 0 (no blood) to 4 (airways awash with blood). In some mildly-affected horses, endoscopy must be performed on multiple occasions to confirm a diagnosis of EIPH.

The level of restraint required to allow endoscopy to be performed depends on the horse; a nose twitch or sedation may be required.

=== Cytopathology ===
Cytopathology (examination under a microscope) of either a tracheal wash or a bronchoalveolar lavage sample can determine whether EIPH has occurred.

1. For acute hemorrhage the number of red blood cells present can be quantified using a hemocytometer. A normal lung wash sample contains fewer than 10 red blood cells/μl of fluid. In the case of EIPH, the numbers will be several magnitudes or more higher.
2. For chronic hemorrhage the presence of high numbers of hemosiderophages, with a lot of iron inside their vesicles, indicate that hemorrhage has occurred in the lung at some time in the past. Hemosiderophages are alveolar macrophages that have ingested and digested red blood cells from previous episodes of EIPH. The end product of the digestion of the red blood cells is an iron-storage complex known as hemosiderin.
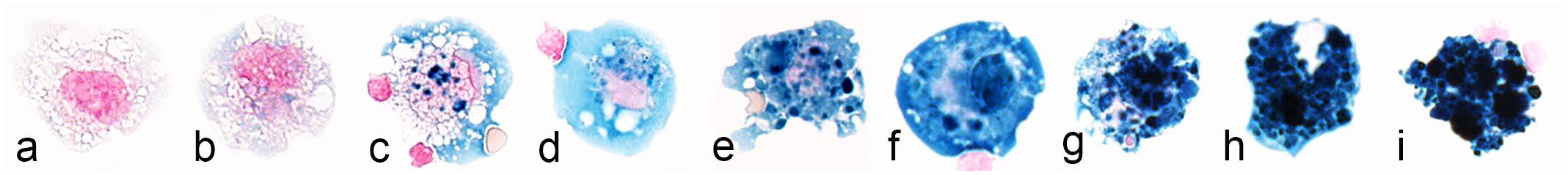
  Schematic of the continuous hemosiderin content in alveolar macrophages stained with Perl’s Prussian blue. According to the scoring system by Doucet and Viel, macrophages have to be classified into 5 discrete grades. (a) Grade 0. (b) Borderline between Grades 0 and 1. (c) Grade 1. (d) Borderline between Grades 1 and 2. (e) Grade 2. (f) Borderline between Grades 2 and 3. (g) Grade 3. (h) Borderline between Grades 3 and 4. (i) Grade 4.

==== Bronchoalveolar lavage ====
Bronchoalveolar lavage (BAL) is a procedure whereby a small volume of fluid is instilled into and immediately retrieved from the lower airways to sample the cells and fluids of the alveoli and epithelium of the bronchi. BAL may be performed using a BAL tube, which allows fluid to be added to and removed from the bronchi, or may be performed during endoscopy, if the endoscope has an irrigation channel. To perform BAL, the horse is usually sedated, and local anaesthetic is usually instilled into the airways to reduce coughing.

BAL is less useful when severe hemorrhage has occurred. BAL results only reflect the situation in the localized region of the lung which has been lavaged, and may not be representative of the whole lung. The fluid obtained by BAL is submitted for cytological examination.

=== Imaging ===
==== Radiography ====
Imaging the lungs by taking a radiograph (x-ray) of the chest cannot be used to diagnose EIPH, as the lungs of affected and unaffected horses share the same characteristics.

==== Pulmonary scintigraphy ====
Scintigraphy of the lungs may detect moderate to severe alterations in the perfusion and possibly ventilation of the dorso-caudal lung. The use of radio-labelled red blood cells and scintigraphy to localise and or quantify hemorrhage is not useful due to general sequestration of labeled RBC by the lung, even in the absence of hemorrhage.

=== Post-mortem examination ===
EIPH seldom causes the death of a horse, but if an affected horse dies and undergoes a post-mortem examination, repeated episodes of EIPH will have caused a characteristic blue-gray-brown staining in the lungs. The staining is due to the presence of hemosiderin. The staining is usually most intense in the dorso-caudal region of the left and right diaphragmatic lobes which often progresses cranioventral with repetitive damage. There are often distinct borders between healthy lung tissue and those parts of the lungs that have been affected by EIPH. Other histopathologic findings include fibrosis, bronchial artery neovascularization, venous remodeling, bronchiolitis, hemosiderin accumulation, increased tissue cellularity (i.e. hemosiderophages), multifocal areas of inflammation, and increased thickness of vascular and airway walls.

== Causes ==
EIPH occurs when blood enters the air passages of a horse's lung, due to fractured capillaries. A variety of causes have been proposed, but EIPH is most likely a multi-factorial condition, involving airway, vascular, inflammatory, blood, cardiac, locomotory, and remodelling components.

The primary mechanism is likely to be high pulmonary vascular pressures with concurrent negative airway pressures, causing extreme stress across the pulmonary capillary membrane (the fragile membrane separating blood in the pulmonary capillaries from the air-filled alveoli) and consequent hemorrhage into the air spaces of the lung. Other contributing factors may include upper airway obstruction, increased blood viscosity, abnormalities of cardiac origin (small cross-sectional area of atrioventricular valves, stiff valves, slow left ventricular relaxation time, right tricuspid valve regurgitation), preferential distribution of blood flow to the dorsocaudal lung regions, mechanical trauma, lower airway obstruction, inflammation, abnormalities of blood coagulation, inhomogeneity of ventilation and locomotory trauma. EIPH begins in the dorso-caudal region of the lung and progresses in a cranioventral direction over time.

=== High pulmonary blood pressures ===
The most widely accepted theory is that high transmural pressures lead to pulmonary capillary stress failure. There may be contributions from the bronchial circulation. Pulmonary capillary transmural pressure is determined by pulmonary capillary pressure and airway pressure. The horse has very high pulmonary vascular pressures during intense exercise, exceeding 100 mmHg in the pulmonary artery during intense exercise. During expiration the high positive pressures in the pulmonary blood vessels pushing out are opposed by high positive airway pressures pushing back and this does not place undue stress on the thin blood vessel walls. During inspiration, the high positive pressures in the pulmonary blood vessels pushing out are met by negative pressures distending the blood vessel and placing increased stress on the walls. Studies in vitro show that significant disruption of the pulmonary capillaries occurs at pressures of approximately 80 mmHg. In vivo, significant EIPH occurs above a mean pulmonary artery pressure of around 80–95 mmHg. On the basis of this theory, any factor or disease that would increase pulmonary vascular pressures (e.g. hypervolaemia) or increase the magnitude of the negative pressures in the lung during inspiration (e.g. dynamic upper airway obstruction) would increase the severity of EIPH; however neither experimentally induced laryngeal hemiplegia nor dorsal displacement of the soft palate increase pulmonary capillary transmural pressure. Furthermore, the magnitude of exercise-induced pulmonary arterial, capillary and venous hypertension is reportedly similar in horses either with or without EIPH.

=== Locomotory associated trauma ===
This theory is based on the fact that, during galloping, the absence of any bone attachment of the forelegs to the spine in the horse causes the shoulder to compress the cranial rib cage. The compression of the chest initiates a pressure wave of compression and expansion which spreads outwards. However, due to the shape of the lung and reflections off the chest wall, the wave of expansion and compression becomes focused and amplified in the dorso-caudal lung. The alternate expansion and compression at the microscopic level in adjacent areas of lung tissue creates shear stress and capillary disruption. The theory predicts that hemorrhage would be more severe on hard track surfaces, but it does not explain why EIPH can occur in horses during swimming exercise.

=== Veno-occlusive remodelling ===
This theory proposes how high pulmonary venous pressures may lead to the capillary rupture and the tissue changes observed in EIPH. Regional veno-occlusive remodeling, especially within the caudodorsal lung fields, contributes to the pathogenesis of EIPH, with the venous remodeling leading to regional vascular congestion and hemorrhage, hemosiderin accumulation, fibrosis, and bronchial angiogenesis.

=== Risk factors ===
While all horses undertaking intense exercise experience some degree of EIPH, some horses consistently experience greater haemorrhage and other horses experience isolated episodes of increased EIPH. In the case of horses that consistently demonstrate greater severity of EIPH this is most likely due to congenital factors, such as very high pulmonary vascular pressures. In horses that experience isolated episodes of increased severity of EIPH, possible contributing factors may include, amongst others, pulmonary infection or atrial fibrillation, inflammation, longer distances, longer duration of exercise, hard surfaces, steeplechasing/hurdling, increased length of career, breed (i.e. Thoroughbred greater than Standardbred), time in training/racing, genetics, and cold temperatures.

== Management and treatment ==
Furosemide (trade name: Lasix) administered prior to racing or strenuous exercise in Thoroughbred and Standardbred racehorses reduces the severity EIPH in 68% of horses. Up to 85% of Thoroughbred racehorses in the United States have been administered furosemide at least once during their racing career. Furosemide decreases pulmonary arterial pressure via its diuretic effects, bronchodilates, and redistributes blood flow during exercise. It reduces EIPH ranging from 90% at sub-maximal exercise and about 50% at maximal exercise intensities. However, over time, it causes electrolyte imbalances and has reduced effectiveness. Furosemide is prohibited in competing horses in some countries, and by the International Olympic Committee. The United States and Canada are the only countries which permit furosemide use during racing.

Other vascular agents such as nitric oxide (NO), n-nitro-l-arginine methyl ester (L-Name), nitroglycerin, NO + phosphodiesterase inhibitors (e.g., sildenafil), and endothelin receptor antagonists have no effect, and in some cases worsen of the EIPH.

Equine nasal strips are a non-pharmacological option with strong scientific support for the prophylactic reduction of exercise-induced pulmonary hemorrhage (EIPH). Numerous studies have hypothesized—and Holcombe et al. (2002) confirmed—that the strip’s spring-like action prevents collapse of the soft tissues within the nasal cavity. This mechanism maintains airway diameter during exercise, countering the exponential rise in airway resistance and work of breathing that, if unchecked, accounts for over 50% of total inspiratory resistance. By reducing inspiratory resistance, the strip decreases the negative pressure on the delicate blood-gas barrier, thus reducing capillary rupture and consequent hemorrhage into the airways. Moreover, the nasal strip elicits a proportionately greater reduction in inspiratory resistance and EIPH as exercise duration and intensity increases. At maximal exertion, the nasal strip’s effectiveness in reducing EIPH matches that of furosemide, [38] and combining Lasix with the nasal strip has a synergistic effect in further reducing EIPH. Both treadmill [35,37] and racetrack [39] studies have shown that horses with severe bleeding experience the greatest benefit from nasal strips. Additionally, the strip lessens the work and blood flow needed by the inspiratory muscles, allowing more oxygenated blood to be diverted to locomotory muscles, increasing exercise tolerance. [35,37,38,40] Nasal strips are widely approved for flat and harness racing in North America, multiple international jurisdictions, and by all major non-racing regulatory bodies. [40]

Bronchodilatation is already maximized in the exercising horse, therefore bronchodilatory agents such as ipratropium, albuterol, or clenbuterol are not effective in reducing EIPH.

Coagulation dysfunction is not a cause of EIPH, and anticoagulatory agents, including carbazochrome salicylate, aspirin, Premarin, Amicar, and vitamin K, are not effective in reducing EIPH, and in some cases may worsen it.

Omega-3 fatty acids (DHA and EPA) reduce EIPH, presumably via increasing the functionality of the white blood cells (WBCs) in removing the blood from the lungs. Concentrated equine serum reduced EIPH by 53% through a combined mechanism of a 30% reduction in inflammation and an increased functionality of the WBCs. Other anti-inflammatory agents, such as hesperidin-citrus bioflavinoids, vitamin C, NSAIDs such as phenylbutazone, corticosteroids, heated water vapor therapy, cromoglicic acid or nedocromil, have no beneficial effects in reducing EIPH severity. Phenylbutazone can partially reverse the beneficial effects of furosemide.

Other ineffective treatments include leukocyte elastase protease inhibitors, the EIPH Patch, hyperbaric oxygen therapy, pentoxyfylline, guanabenz, clonidine, snake venom, and enalapril.

Horses that undergo surgical correction for upper airway dysfunction are rested, and are under environmentally controlled environments with reduced dust may see some benefit.

In conclusion, administering furosemide (Lasix) four hours before racing and wearing equine nasal strips (FLAIR®) are the only treatments scientifically proven to effectively reduce EIPH in horses. These interventions remain the standard in EIPH management, supported by their proven efficacy in multiple controlled studies.
