= C19H28N2O4 =

The molecular formula C_{19}H_{28}N_{2}O_{4} may refer to:

- Carpindolol, a beta blocker
- Roxatidine acetate, a histamine H_{2} receptor antagonist drug
