= C10H12N4O3 =

The molecular formula C_{10}H_{12}N_{4}O_{3} (molar mass: 236.23 g/mol, exact mass: 236.0909 u) may refer to:

- Carbazochrome
- Didanosine
