= Avacincaptad pegol =

Medication

Clinical data
- Trade names: Izervay
- Other names: Zimura
- License data: US DailyMed: Avacincaptad pegol
- Routes of administration: Intravitreal
- Drug class: Complement inhibitor
- ATC code: S01XA32 (WHO)

Legal status
- Legal status: US: ℞-only

Identifiers
- CAS Number: 1613641-69-2
- DrugBank: DB15165
- UNII: TT0V5JLG5B
- KEGG: D11748

Chemical and physical data
- Formula: C_{395}H_{453}F_{21}N_{142}Na_{39}O_{262}P_{39}
- Molar mass: 13885.245 g·mol^{−1}

Avacincaptad pegol, sold under the brand name Izervay, is a medication used for the treatment of age-related macular degeneration. Avacincaptad pegol is a complement inhibitor.

Avacincaptad pegol was approved for medical use in the United States in August 2023.

== Medical uses ==
Avacincaptad pegol is indicated for the treatment of geographic atrophy secondary to age-related macular degeneration.

== Society and culture ==
Avacincaptad pegol is the international nonproprietary name.
