= C15H25N3O =

The molecular formula C_{15}H_{25}N_{3}O (molar mass: 263.38 g/mol, exact mass: 263.1998 u) may refer to:

- Caproxamine
- Lisdexamfetamine, brand name Vyvanse
