= C6442H9966N1706O2018S40 =

The molecular formula C_{6442}H_{9966}N_{1706}O_{2018}S_{40} (molar mass: 144.88 kg/mol) may refer to:

- Carlumab
- Crenezumab
