= C19H20FN3 =

The molecular formula C_{19}H_{20}FN_{3} (molar mass: 309.38 g/mol, exact mass: 309.1641 u) may refer to:

- Fluperlapine, or fluoroperlapine
- Gevotroline (WY-47,384)
