= Danicopan =

Medication

Clinical data
- Trade names: Voydeya
- Other names: ACH-4471
- AHFS/Drugs.com: Monograph
- License data: US DailyMed: Danicopan
- Pregnancy category: AU: B3
- Routes of administration: By mouth
- Drug class: Complement factor D inhibitor
- ATC code: L04AJ09 (WHO)

Legal status
- Legal status: AU: S4 (Prescription only); CA: ℞-only; US: ℞-only; EU: Rx-only; In general: ℞ (Prescription only)

Identifiers
- IUPAC name: (2S,4R)-1-{2-[3-acetyl-5-(2-methylpyrimidin-5-yl)-1H-indazol-1-yl]acetyl}-N-(6-bromopyridin-2-yl)-4-fluoropyrrolidine-2-carboxamide
- CAS Number: 1903768-17-1
- DrugBank: DB15401
- ChemSpider: 75531295
- UNII: JM8C1SFX0U
- KEGG: D11641
- ChEMBL: ChEMBL4250860
- ECHA InfoCard: 100.398.865

Chemical and physical data
- Formula: C_{26}H_{23}BrFN_{7}O_{3}
- Molar mass: 580.418 g·mol^{−1}
- 3D model (JSmol): Interactive image
- SMILES: CC(=O)c1nn(CC(=O)N2C[C@H](F)C[C@H]2C(=O)Nc2cccc(Br)n2)c2ccc(-c3cnc(C)nc3)cc12
- InChI: InChI=1S/C26H23BrFN7O3/c1-14(36)25-19-8-16(17-10-29-15(2)30-11-17)6-7-20(19)35(33-25)13-24(37)34-12-18(28)9-21(34)26(38)32-23-5-3-4-22(27)31-23/h3-8,10-11,18,21H,9,12-13H2,1-2H3,(H,31,32,38)/t18-,21+/m1/s1; Key:PIBARDGJJAGJAJ-NQIIRXRSSA-N

Danicopan, sold under the brand name Voydeya, is a medication used for the treatment of paroxysmal nocturnal hemoglobinuria. It is a complement inhibitor which reversibly binds to factor D to prevent alternative pathway-mediated hemolysis and deposition of complement C3 proteins on red blood cells.

The most common side effects include fever, headache, increased levels of liver enzymes and pain in the extremities.

Danicopan was approved for medical use in Japan in January 2024, in the United States in March 2024, and in the European Union in April 2024. The US Food and Drug Administration (FDA) considers it to be a first-in-class medication.

== Medical uses ==
Danicopan is indicated as add-on therapy to ravulizumab or eculizumab for the treatment of extravascular hemolysis in adults with paroxysmal nocturnal hemoglobinuria.

== Society and culture ==
=== Legal status ===
Danicopan was approved for medical use in Japan, the United States, and the European Union in 2024. The FDA granted the application breakthrough therapy designation.

In February 2024, the Committee for Medicinal Products for Human Use of the European Medicines Agency adopted a positive opinion, recommending the granting of a marketing authorization for the medicinal product Voydeya, intended as add-on therapy to ravulizumab or eculizumab for the treatment of residual hemolytic anemia in adults with paroxysmal nocturnal hemoglobinuria. The applicant for this medicinal product is Alexion Europe. Danicopan was authorized for medical use in the European Union in April 2024.

In October 2024, the National Institute for Health and Care Excellence (NICE) adopted a recommendation for danicopan as an add-on therapy for adults with the paroxysmal nocturnal hemoglobinuria based on results from the phase III ALPHA trial, which evaluated the efficacy and safety of the drug as an add-on to ravulizumab or eculizumab in people with paroxysmal nocturnal hemoglobinuria who experienced clinically significant extravascular haemolysis.

=== Names ===
Danicopan is the international nonproprietary name.
