= C19H25NO3 =

The molecular formula C_{19}H_{25}NO_{3} (molar mass: 315.41 g/mol, exact mass: 315.1834 u) may refer to:

- Dopamantine
- 25D-NBOMe, or NBOMe-2C-D
- 25E-NBOH, or NBOH-2C-E
- Mitiglinide
