= Congenital dyserythropoietic anemia type IV =

- Specialty: Hematology

Congenital dyserythropoietic anemia type IV (CDA IV) has been described with typical morphologic features of CDA II but a negative acidified-serum test.

== Presentation ==
CDA type IV is characterized by mild to moderate splenomegaly. Hemoglobin is very low and patients are transfusion dependent. MCV is normal or mildly elevated. Erythropoiesis is normoblastic or mildly to moderately megaloblastic. Nonspecific erythroblast dysplasia is present.

== Genetics ==
Congenital dyserythropoietic anemia type IV is an autosomal dominant inherited red blood cell disorder characterized by ineffective erythropoiesis and hemolysis resulting in anemia. Circulating erythroblasts and erythroblasts in the bone marrow show various morphologic abnormalities. Affected individuals with CDAN4 also have increased levels of fetal hemoglobin.

Type	OMIM	Gene	Locus
CDAN4	613673	KLF1	19p13.13-p13.12

== Treatment ==
Treatment consists of frequent blood transfusions and chelation therapy. Potential cures include bone marrow transplantation and gene therapy.

== See also ==
- Congenital dyserythropoietic anemia
- Hemoglobinopathy
- List of hematologic conditions
- Thalassemia
