= C9H18N2O2 =

The molecular formula C_{9}H_{18}N_{2}O_{2} (molar mass: 186.255 g/mol) may refer to:

- Dimethyl pimelimidate
- Capuride
