= C24H25ClFN5O3 =

The molecular formula C_{24}H_{25}ClFN_{5}O_{3} (molar mass: 485.94 g/mol, exact mass: 485.1630 u) may refer to:

- Afatinib
- Canertinib (CI-1033)
