= Gevotroline =

Chemical compound

Clinical data
- Other names: WY-47,384; WY-47384; WY47384
- Routes of administration: Oral
- ATC code: None

Legal status
- Legal status: In general: uncontrolled

Identifiers
- IUPAC name: 8-fluoro-2-(3-pyridin-3-ylpropyl)-1,3,4,5-tetrahydropyrido[4,3-b]indole
- CAS Number: 107266-06-8
- PubChem CID: 60547
- ChemSpider: 54579
- UNII: 7SZ6A2091Q
- ChEBI: CHEBI:142391
- CompTox Dashboard (EPA): DTXSID00147989

Chemical and physical data
- Formula: C_{19}H_{20}FN_{3}
- Molar mass: 309.388 g·mol^{−1}
- 3D model (JSmol): Interactive image
- SMILES: Fc2cc1c3c([nH]c1cc2)CCN(C3)CCCc4cccnc4

Gevotroline (WY-47,384) is an atypical antipsychotic with a tricyclic structure which was under development for the treatment of schizophrenia by Wyeth-Ayerst. It acts as a balanced, modest affinity D_{2} and 5-HT_{2} receptor antagonist and also possesses high affinity for the sigma receptor. It was well tolerated and showed efficacy in phase II clinical trials but was never marketed.

== See also ==
- Substituted γ-carboline
- Carvotroline
- Atiprosin
- Azepindole
