= Ravulizumab =

Pharmaceutical drug

Monoclonal antibody
- Type: Whole antibody
- Source: Humanized (from mouse)
- Target: Complement component 5

Clinical data
- Pronunciation: rav" ue liz' ue mab
- Trade names: Ultomiris
- Other names: ALXN1210, ravulizumab-cwvz
- AHFS/Drugs.com: Monograph
- MedlinePlus: a619014
- License data: US DailyMed: Ravulizumab
- Pregnancy category: AU: B2
- Routes of administration: Intravenous
- Drug class: Complement inhibitor
- ATC code: L04AJ02 (WHO)

Legal status
- Legal status: AU: S4 (Prescription only); CA: ℞-only / Schedule D; UK: POM (Prescription only); US: ℞-only; EU: Rx-only; In general: ℞ (Prescription only)

Pharmacokinetic data
- Metabolism: various proteases

Identifiers
- CAS Number: 1803171-55-2
- DrugBank: DB11580
- ChemSpider: none
- UNII: C3VX249T6L
- KEGG: D11054

Chemical and physical data
- Formula: C_{6430}H_{9888}N_{1696}O_{2028}S_{48}
- Molar mass: 144938.56 g·mol^{−1}

Ravulizumab, sold under the brand name Ultomiris, is a humanized monoclonal antibody complement inhibitor medication designed for the treatment of paroxysmal nocturnal hemoglobinuria (PNH), atypical hemolytic uremic syndrome (aHUS), generalized myasthenia gravis (gMG), and neuromyelitis optica spectrum disorder (NMOSD). It is designed to bind to and prevent the activation of complement component 5 (C5).

Paroxysmal nocturnal hemoglobinuria is characterized by red blood cell destruction, anemia (red blood cells unable to carry enough oxygen to tissues), blood clots, and impaired bone marrow function (not making enough blood cells). In paroxysmal nocturnal hemoglobinuria, proteins known as the "complement system", which is part of the immune system, become overactive because of a genetic mutation and start to attack the patients' own red blood cells. Ravulizumab is a monoclonal antibody (a type of protein) designed to attach to the C5 protein, which is part of the complement system. By attaching to the C5 protein, the medicine blocks its effect and thereby reduces the destruction of red blood cells.

== Medical uses ==
In the United States, ravulizumab is indicated for the treatment of adults and children one month of age and older with paroxysmal nocturnal hemoglobinuria and for the treatment of adults and children one month of age and older with atypical hemolytic uremic syndrome (aHUS) to inhibit complement-mediated thrombotic microangiopathy (TMA).

In the European Union, ravulizumab is indicated in the treatment of adults with paroxysmal nocturnal haemoglobinuria:

- in people with haemolysis with clinical symptom(s) indicative of high disease activity
- in people who are clinically stable after having been treated with eculizumab for at least the past six months.

== Adverse effects ==
The most common side effects are upper respiratory tract infection (nose and throat infection), nasopharyngitis (inflammation of the nose and throat) and headache. The most serious side effect is increased risk of meningococcal infection, a bacterial infection caused by Neisseria meningitidis that can cause meningitis and sepsis. Strategies to mitigate risk, increase awareness, and deploy more readily available vaccines have been shown to be effective in keeping infection rates stable, despite increasing usage of the drug.

== History ==
Ravulizumab was developed by Alexion Pharmaceuticals, Inc. It was engineered from eculizumab to have a longer-lasting effect.

Ravulizumab was approved by the US Food and Drug Administration (FDA) in December 2018. In April 2019, the Committee for Medicinal Products for Human Use (CHMP) of the European Medicines Agency (EMA) recommended the granting of a conditional marketing authorization for ravulizumab. Ravulizumab was authorized for medical use in the EU in July 2019.

== Society and culture ==
=== Brand names ===
Ravulizumab is the International Nonproprietary Name (INN).
