= Crovalimab =

Monoclonal antibody

Monoclonal antibody
- Type: Whole antibody
- Source: Humanized
- Target: Complement component 5 (C5)

Clinical data
- Trade names: Piasky
- Other names: crovalimab-akkz
- AHFS/Drugs.com: Monograph
- MedlinePlus: a624046
- License data: US DailyMed: Crovalimab
- Routes of administration: Subcutaneous, intravenous
- Drug class: Complement inhibitor
- ATC code: L04AJ07 (WHO)

Legal status
- Legal status: CA: ℞-only; US: ℞-only; EU: Rx-only; In general: ℞ (Prescription only)

Identifiers
- CAS Number: 1917321-26-6
- DrugBank: DB16128
- UNII: H9KH1GP3UU
- KEGG: D11696

Chemical and physical data
- Formula: C_{6430}H_{9974}N_{1726}O_{2026}S_{46}
- Molar mass: 145349.34 g·mol^{−1}

Crovalimab, sold under the brand name Piasky, is a monoclonal antibody used for the treatment of people with paroxysmal nocturnal hemoglobinuria. It is a complement component 5 (C5) inhibitor.

Crovalimab was approved for use in China in February 2024, in Japan in April 2024, in the United States in June 2024, and in the European Union in August 2024. It was developed and is marketed by Roche/Genentech.

== Medical uses ==
In the US, crovalimab is indicated for the treatment of people aged 13 years of age and older with paroxysmal nocturnal hemoglobinuria and body weight of at least 40 kilograms (88 lb).

== Adverse effects ==
The US Food and Drug Administration (FDA) label for crovalimab contains a boxed warning about the increased risk of Neisseria meningitidis infection, which can be life-threatening.

== History ==
=== Clinical trials ===
Three phase III clinical trials have evaluated crovalimab in both people who were C5 inhibitor–naive and those switching to crovalimab from other C5 inhibitors.

COMMODORE 1 is a phase III randomized clinical trial comparing crovalimab vs eculizumab in people with paroxysmal nocturnal hemoglobinuria treated with C5 inhibitors. COMMODORE 1 examines the safety, tolerability and pharmacokinetic/pharmacodynamic properties of crovalimab in PNH patients switching from eculizumab. The study showed that crovalimab maintained disease control in PNH patients switching from eculizumab.

COMMODORE 2 is a phase III randomized trial comparing crovalimab vs eculizumab in people with paroxysmal nocturnal hemoglobinuria who are naive to C5 inhibitor treatment. COMMODORE 2 was positive for its co-primary endpoints, transfusion avoidance and hemolysis control (measured lactate dehydrogenase levels) which are disease control indicators, and its data shows crovalimab is non-inferior to eculizumab.

COMMODORE 3 is a phase III single-arm trial run in China, studying crovalimab in C5 inhibitor-naive people with paroxysmal nocturnal hemoglobinuria. COMMODORE 3 assessed the safety, efficacy, pharmacokinetics, and pharmacodynamics of crovalimab in people with C5-naive paroxysmal nocturnal hemoglobinuria. The study met the co-primary efficacy endpoints of haemolysis control and transfusion avoidance.

== Society and culture ==
=== Legal status ===
Crovalimab was approved for use in China in February 2024, and in Japan in April 2024.

Crovalimab was approved for medical use in the United States in June 2024.

In June 2024, the Committee for Medicinal Products for Human Use of the European Medicines Agency adopted a positive opinion, recommending the granting of a marketing authorization for the medicinal product Piasky, intended as monotherapy for the treatment of people twelve years of age or older with a weight of 40 kilograms (88 lb) and above with paroxysmal nocturnal haemoglobinuria. The applicant for this medicinal product is Roche Registration GmbH. Crovalimab was authorized for medical use in the European Union in August 2024.

=== Names ===
Crovalimab is the international nonproprietary name.

== Research ==
Crovalimab is the subject of five phase III studies for paroxysmal nocturnal hemoglobinuria and atypical hemolytic uremic syndrome (aHUS). It is also being investigated for the treatment of sickle cell disease and other conditions.
