= Paroxysmal nocturnal hemoglobinuria =

Blood disease in which red blood cells are attacked by the immune system

- Other names: Paroxysmal nocturnal haemoglobinuria, Marchiafava–Micheli syndrome
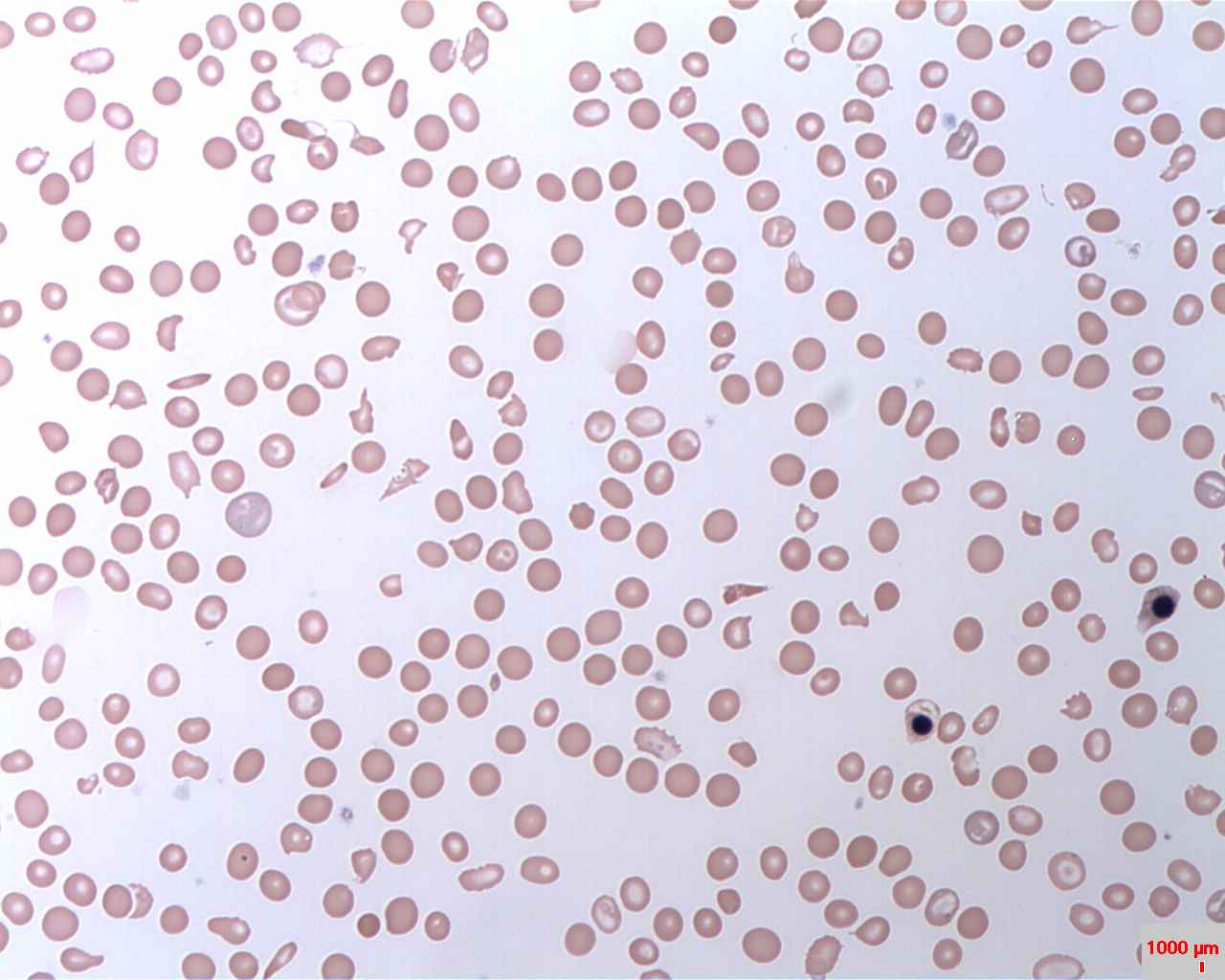
- Intravascular hemolytic anemia
- Specialty: Hematology
- Frequency: 0.005%

Paroxysmal nocturnal hemoglobinuria (PNH) is a rare, acquired, life-threatening disease of the blood characterized by destruction of red blood cells by the complement system, a part of the body's innate immune system. This destructive process occurs due to deficiency of the red blood cell surface protein DAF, which normally inhibits such immune reactions. Since the complement cascade attacks the red blood cells within the blood vessels of the circulatory system, the red blood cell destruction (hemolysis) is considered an intravascular hemolytic anemia. There is ongoing research into other key features of the disease, such as the high incidence of venous blood clot formation. Research suggests that PNH thrombosis (a blood clot) is caused by both the absence of GPI-anchored complement regulatory proteins (CD55 and CD59) on PNH platelets and the excessive consumption of nitric oxide (NO).

PNH is the only hemolytic anemia caused by an acquired (rather than inherited) intrinsic defect in the cell membrane (deficiency of glycophosphatidylinositol or GPI) leading to the absence of protective exterior surface proteins that normally attach via a GPI anchor. It may develop on its own ("primary PNH") or in the context of other bone marrow disorders such as aplastic anemia ("secondary PNH"). Only a minority of affected people have the telltale red urine in the morning that originally gave the condition its name.

Allogeneic bone marrow transplantation is the only cure, but has significant rates of additional medical problems and the risk of death. The monoclonal antibody eculizumab reduces the need for blood transfusions and improves quality of life for those affected by PNH. Eculizumab dramatically alters the natural course of PNH, reducing symptoms and disease complications as well as improving survival to the extent that it may be equivalent to that of the general population.

== Signs and symptoms ==
The classic sign of PNH is red discoloration of the urine due to the presence of hemoglobin and hemosiderin from the breakdown of red blood cells. As the urine is more concentrated in the morning, this is when the color is most pronounced. This phenomenon mainly occurs in those who have the primary form of PNH, who will notice this at some point in their disease course. The remainder mainly experience the symptoms of anemia, such as fatigue, shortness of breath, and palpitations.A small proportion of patients report attacks of abdominal pain, difficulty swallowing and pain during swallowing, as well as erectile dysfunction in men; this occurs mainly when the breakdown of red blood cells is rapid, and is attributable to spasm of smooth muscle due to depletion of nitric oxide by red cell breakdown products.

Forty percent of people with PNH develop thrombosis at some point in their illness. This is the main cause of severe complications and death in PNH. These may develop in common sites (deep vein thrombosis of the leg and resultant pulmonary embolism when these clots break off and enter the lungs), but in PNH blood clots may also form in more unusual sites: the hepatic vein (causing Budd–Chiari syndrome), the portal vein of the liver (causing portal vein thrombosis), the superior or inferior mesenteric vein (causing mesenteric ischemia) and veins of the skin. Cerebral venous thrombosis, an uncommon form of stroke, is more common in those with PNH.

== Pathophysiology ==
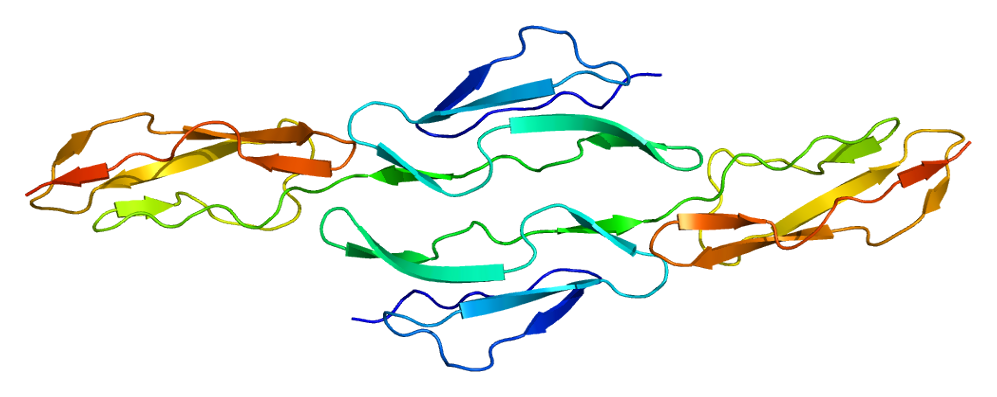
CD55 protein/Decay Accelerating Factor structure

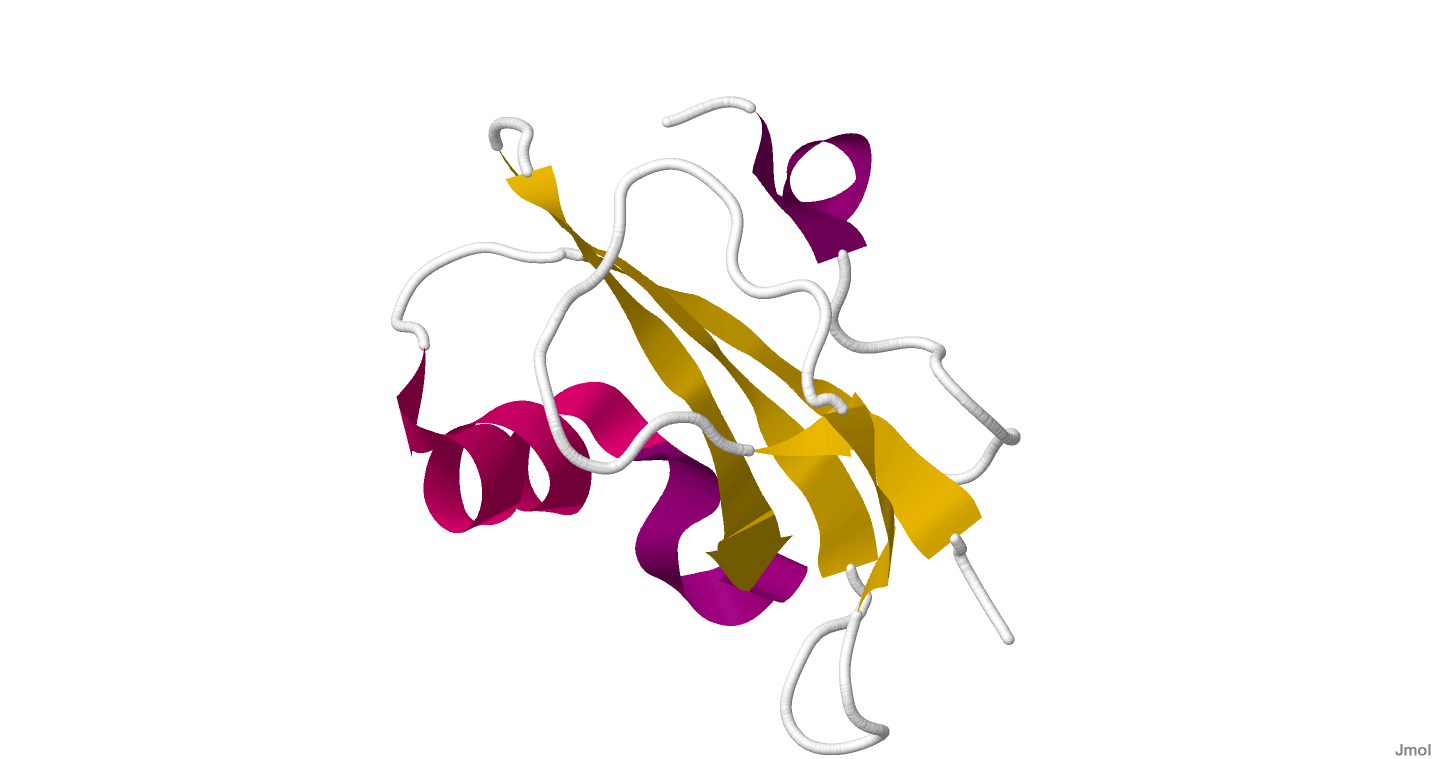
CD59 protein/Protectin structure

All cells have proteins attached to their membranes, often serving as a mode of communication or signaling between the cell and the surrounding environment. These signaling proteins are physically attached to the cell membrane in various ways, commonly anchored by glycolipids such as glycosyl phosphatidylinositols (GPI). PNH occurs as a result of a defect in the assembling of these glycolipid-protein structures on the surface of blood cells.The most common defective enzyme in PNH is phosphatidylinositol glycan A (PIGA), one of several enzymes needed to make GPI. The gene that codes for PIGA is located on the X chromosome. As males have only a single X chromosome and, in females, one is silenced through X-inactivation), only one active copy of the gene for PIGA is present in each cell regardless of sex. A mutation in the PIGA gene can lead to the absence of GPI anchors expressed on the cell membrane. When this mutation occurs in a hematopoietic stem cell in the bone marrow, all of the cells it produces will also have the defect.

Several of the proteins that anchor to GPI on the cell membrane are used to protect the cell from destruction by the complement system, and, without these anchors, the cells are more easily targeted by the complement proteins. Although red blood cells, white blood cells, and platelets are targeted by complement, red blood cells are particularly vulnerable to lysis. The complement system is part of the innate immune system and has a variety of functions, from destroying invading microorganisms by opsonization to direct destabilization by the membrane attack complex. The main proteins that protect blood cells from destruction are decay-accelerating factor (DAF/CD55), which disrupts formation of C3-convertase, and protectin (CD59/MIRL/MAC-IP), which binds the membrane attack complex and prevents C9 from binding to the cell.

The symptoms of esophageal spasm, erectile dysfunction, and abdominal pain are attributed to the fact that hemoglobin released during hemolysis binds with circulating nitric oxide, a substance that is needed to relax smooth muscle. This theory is supported by the fact that these symptoms improve on administration of nitrates or sildenafil (Viagra), which improves the effect of nitric oxide on muscle cells. There is a suspicion that chronic hemolysis causing chronically depleted nitric oxide may lead to the development of pulmonary hypertension (increased pressure in the blood vessels supplying the lung), which in turn puts strain on the heart and causes heart failure.

Historically, the role of sleep and night in this disease (the "nocturnal" component of the name) has been attributed to acidification of the blood at night due to relative hypoventilation and accumulation of carbon dioxide in the blood during sleep. This hypothesis has been questioned by researchers who note that not all those with PNH have increased hemolysis during sleep, so it is uncertain how important a role sleep actually plays in this disease.

== Diagnosis ==
Blood tests in PNH show changes consistent with intravascular hemolytic anemia: low hemoglobin, raised lactate dehydrogenase, raised bilirubin (a breakdown product of hemoglobin), and decreased levels of haptoglobin; there can be raised reticulocytes (immature red cells released by the bone marrow to replace the destroyed cells) if there is no concurrent problem with production of red cells (such as iron deficiency). The direct antiglobulin test (DAT, or direct Coombs' test) is negative, as the hemolysis of PNH is not caused by antibodies. If the PNH occurs in the setting of known (or suspected) aplastic anemia, abnormal white blood cell counts and decreased platelet counts may be seen at this. In this case, anemia may be caused by insufficient red blood cell production in addition to the hemolysis. Historically, the sucrose lysis test, in which a patient's red blood cells are placed in low-ionic-strength solution and observed for hemolysis, was used for screening. If this was positive, the Ham's acid hemolysis test (after Dr Thomas Ham, who described the test in 1937) was performed for confirmation. The Ham test involves placing red blood cells in mild acid; a positive result (increased RBC fragility) indicates PNH or Congenital dyserythropoietic anemia. This is now an obsolete test for diagnosing PNH due to its low sensitivity and specificity.

Today, the gold standard is flow cytometry for CD55 and CD59 on white and red blood cells. Based on the levels of these cell proteins, erythrocytes may be classified as type I, II, or III PNH cells. Type I cells have normal levels of CD55 and CD59; type II have reduced levels; and type III have absent levels. The fluorescein-labeled proaerolysin (FLAER) test is being used more frequently to diagnose PNH. FLAER binds selectively to the glycophosphatidylinositol anchor and is more accurate in demonstrating a deficit than simply for CD59 or CD55.

=== Classification ===
PNH is classified by the context under which it is diagnosed:

- Classic PNH. Evidence of PNH in the absence of another bone marrow disorder.
- PNH in the setting of another specified bone marrow disorder such as aplastic anemia and myelodysplastic syndrome (MDS).
- Subclinical PNH. PNH abnormalities on flow cytometry without signs of hemolysis.

== Screening ==
There are several groups where screening for PNH should be undertaken. These include patients with unexplained thrombosis who are young, have thrombosis in an unusual site (e.g. intra-abdominal veins, cerebral veins, dermal veins), have any evidence of hemolysis (e.g. a raised LDH), or have a low red blood cell, white blood cell, or platelet count. Those who have a diagnosis of aplastic anemia should be screened annually.

== Treatment ==
=== Acute attacks ===
There is disagreement as to whether steroids (such as prednisolone) can decrease the severity of hemolytic crises. Transfusion therapy may be needed; in addition to correcting significant anemia, this suppresses the production of PNH cells by the bone marrow, and indirectly the severity of the hemolysis. Iron deficiency develops with time, due to losses in urine, and may have to be treated if present. Iron therapy can result in more hemolysis as more PNH cells are produced.

=== Long-term ===
PNH is a chronic condition. In patients with only a small clone and few problems, monitoring of the flow cytometry every six months gives information on the severity and risk of potential complications. Given the high risk of thrombosis in PNH, preventive treatment with warfarin decreases the risk of thrombosis in those with a large clone (50% of white blood cells type III).Episodes of thrombosis are treated as they would in other patients, but, given that PNH is a persisting underlying cause, it is likely that treatment with warfarin or similar drugs needs to be continued long-term after an episode of thrombosis.

=== Crovalimab ===
Crovalimab, sold under the brand name Piasky, is a monoclonal antibody used for the treatment of people with paroxysmal nocturnal hemoglobinuria. It is a complement component 5 (C5) inhibitor.

Crovalimab was approved for use in China in February 2024, in Japan in April 2024, in the United States in June 2024, and in the European Union in August 2024. It was developed and is marketed by Roche/Genentech.

=== Danicopan ===
Danicopan, sold under the brand name Voydeya, is a medication used for the treatment of paroxysmal nocturnal hemoglobinuria. It is a complement inhibitor which reversibly binds to factor D to prevent alternative pathway-mediated hemolysis and deposition of complement C3 proteins on red blood cells.

The most common side effects include fever, headache, increased levels of liver enzymes and pain in the extremities.

Danicopan was approved for medical use in Japan in January 2024, in the United States in March 2024, and in the European Union in April 2024. The US Food and Drug Administration (FDA) considers it to be a first-in-class medication.

=== Eculizumab ===
Eculizumab, sold under the brand name Soliris among others, is a recombinant humanized monoclonal antibody used to treat paroxysmal nocturnal hemoglobinuria, atypical hemolytic uremic syndrome, generalized myasthenia gravis, and neuromyelitis optica. In people with paroxysmal nocturnal hemoglobinuria, it reduces both the destruction of red blood cells and need for blood transfusion, but does not appear to affect the risk of death. Eculizumab was the first medication approved for each of its uses, and its approval was granted based on small trials. It is given by intravenous infusion. It is a humanized monoclonal antibody functioning as a terminal complement inhibitor. It binds to the complement C5 protein and inhibits activation of the complement system, a part of the body's immune system. This binding prevents the breakdown of red blood cells in the bloodstream (intravascular hemolysis) in people with paroxysmal nocturnal hemoglobinuria and atypical hemolytic uremic syndrome.

The most frequently reported adverse reactions for people with paroxysmal nocturnal hemoglobinuria include headache, nasopharyngitis (common cold), back pain and nausea The most frequently reported adverse reactions for people with atypical hemolytic uremic syndrome include headache, diarrhea, hypertension, upper respiratory infection, abdominal pain, vomiting, nasopharyngitis, anemia, cough, swelling of lower legs or hands, nausea, urinary tract infections and fever

Eculizumab (Soliris) is developed, manufactured, and marketed by Alexion Pharmaceuticals.

=== Iptacopan ===
Iptacopan, sold under the brand name Fabhalta, is a medication used for the treatment of paroxysmal nocturnal hemoglobinuria and proteinuria. It is a complement factor B inhibitor that was developed by Novartis. It is taken by mouth.

Iptacopan was approved for medical use in the United States in December 2023, and in the European Union in May 2024. The US Food and Drug Administration considers it to be a first-in-class medication.

=== Pegcetacoplan ===
Pegcetacoplan, sold under the brand name Empaveli among others, is a medication used to treat paroxysmal nocturnal hemoglobinuria, geographic atrophy of the retina, glomerulopathy C3 and membranoproliferative globulonephritis. Pegcetacoplan is a complement inhibitor.

The most common side effects include injection-site reactions, infections, diarrhea, abdominal pain, respiratory tract infection, viral infection, and fatigue.

Paroxysmal nocturnal hemoglobinuria is characterized by red blood cell destruction, anemia (red blood cells unable to carry enough oxygen to tissues), blood clots, and impaired bone marrow function (not making enough blood cells).

Pegcetacoplan is the first treatment for paroxysmal nocturnal hemoglobinuria that binds to and inhibits complement protein C3. Pegcetacoplan was approved for medical use in the United States in May 2021. The US Food and Drug Administration (FDA) considers it to be a first-in-class medication.

In 2024, the American Society of Nephrology Annual Kidney Meeting, the study group who investigating pegcetacoplan in the largest multicenter double-blind VALIANT trial, showed its significant benefits in the treatment of patients with C3 glomerulopathy or primary immune complex–mediated membranoproliferative glomerulonephritis. C3 glomerulopathy leads to kidney failure in approximately 50% of patients within 5–10 years of diagnosis, and even when patients do receive a kidney transplant, approximately two thirds experience disease recurrence. Pegcetacoplan introduce a potential "kidney- and life-saving option" for patients with C3 glomerulopathy.

== Epidemiology ==
PNH is rare, with an annual rate of 1–2 cases per million. The prognosis without disease-modifying treatment is 10–20 years. Many cases develop in people who have previously been diagnosed with myelodysplastic syndrome (MDS). The fact that PNH develops in MDS also explains why there appears to be a higher rate of leukemia in PNH, as MDS can sometimes transform into leukemia or aplastic anemia.

25% of female cases of PNH are discovered during pregnancy. This group has a high rate of thrombosis, and the risk of death of both mother and child are significantly increased (20% and 8% respectively).

== History ==
The first description of paroxysmal hemoglobinuria was by the German physician Paul Strübing (Greifswald, 1852–1915) during a lecture in 1881, later published in 1882. Later comprehensive descriptions were made by Ettore Marchiafava and Alessio Nazari in 1911, with further elaborations by Marchiafava in 1928 and Ferdinando Micheli in 1931.

The Dutch physician Enneking coined the term "paroxysmal nocturnal hemoglobinuria" (or haemoglobinuria paroxysmalis nocturna in Latin) in 1928, which has since become the default description. Historically, the term Marchiafava Micheli syndrome has been used.

== Society and culture ==
=== Economics ===
Eculizumab costs at least US$440,000 for a single year of treatment and has been reported as one of the world's most expensive drugs.
