= Axona =

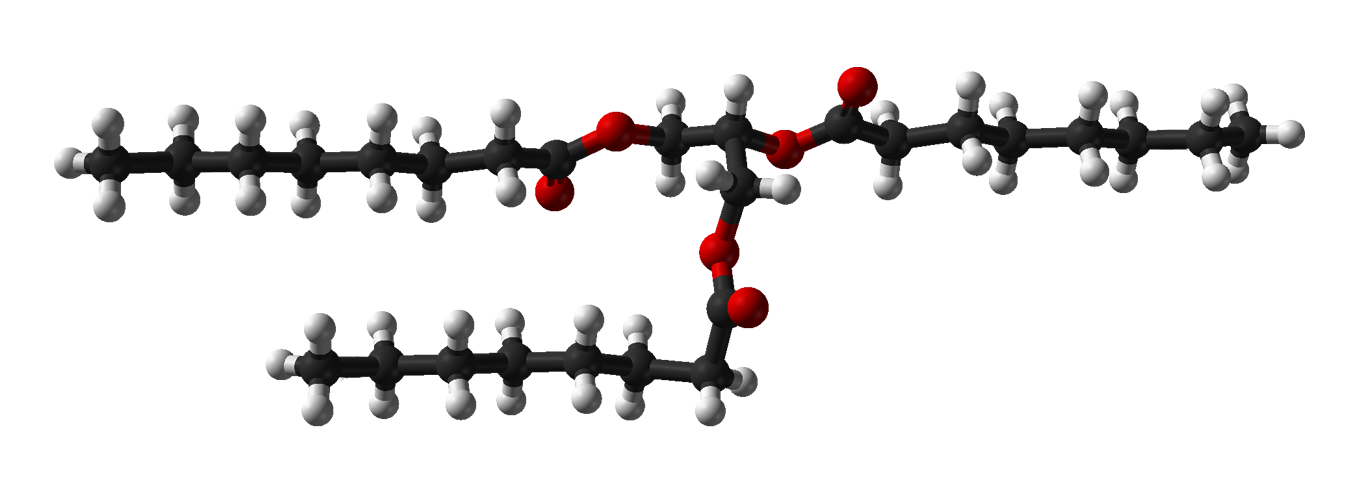

Names
- IUPAC name Tri-O-octanoylglycerol
- Systematic IUPAC name Propane-1,2,3-triyl tri(octanoate)
- Other names Glycerol trioctanoate; Tricaprylin; [2-Octanoyloxy-1-(octanoyloxymethyl)ethyl] octanoate

Identifiers
CAS Number	538-23-8
3D model (JSmol)	Interactive image
ChEBI	CHEBI:76978
ChemSpider	10393
ECHA InfoCard	100.007.898
KEGG	D01587
PubChem CID	10850
UNII	6P92858988
CompTox Dashboard (EPA)	DTXSID6021375
- InChI: InChI=1S/C27H50O6/c1-4-7-10-13-16-19-25(28)31-22-24(33-27(30)21-18-15-12-9-6-3)23-32-26(29)20-17-14-11-8-5-2/h24H,4-23H2,1-3H3 Key: VLPFTAMPNXLGLX-UHFFFAOYSA-N; InChI=1/C27H50O6/c1-4-7-10-13-16-19-25(28)31-22-24(33-27(30)21-18-15-12-9-6-3)23-32-26(29)20-17-14-11-8-5-2/h24H,4-23H2,1-3H3 Key: VLPFTAMPNXLGLX-UHFFFAOYAW
- SMILES: O=C(OCC(OC(=O)CCCCCCC)COC(=O)CCCCCCC)CCCCCCC

Properties
Chemical formula	C_{27}H_{50}O_{6}
Molar mass	470.691 g·mol^{−1}
- Except where otherwise noted, data are given for materials in their standard state (at 25 °C [77 °F], 100 kPa). verify (what is ?) Infobox references

Axona was previously marketed as a medical food for the clinical dietary management of the impairment of metabolic processes associated with mild to moderate Alzheimer's disease. It is a proprietary formulation of fractionated palm kernel oil (caprylic triglyceride), a medium-chain triglyceride. Cericin, the company that makes Axona, states that during digestion, caprylic triglyceride is broken down into ketones, which provide an alternative energy source for the brain. Its use is based on the idea that the brain's ability to use its normal energy source, glucose, is impaired in Alzheimer's disease. Axona was first sold in March 2009.

In 2013, US Food and Drug Administration (FDA) determined Axona was misbranded because the product was labeled and marketed as a medical food but does not meet the statutory definition of a medical food. Axona has not been approved by the FDA as a drug to treat Alzheimer's and the efficacy of managing the health of Alzheimer's patients by use of this medical food has been questioned by experts in the field, including the Alzheimer's Association.

== Description ==
Axona is a medical food marketed to assist with dietary management of mild to moderate Alzheimer's disease. Axona is formulated for oral administration and is sold by prescription. The largest ingredient in Axona is caprylic triglyceride, also known as fractionated coconut oil, a medium-chain triglyceride. caprylic triglyceride is generally recognized as safe (GRAS) by the FDA.

A medical food in the US is an official FDA product classification, and was originally defined by Congress as part of the Orphan Drug Amendments of 1988 as "a food which is formulated to be consumed or administered through a feeding tube under the supervision of a physician and which is intended for the specific dietary management of a disease or condition for which distinctive nutritional requirements, based on recognized scientific principles, are established by medical evaluation." Medical foods are not drugs and cannot be marketed as treating or preventing a disease or condition; the FDA does not evaluate the efficacy and safety of medical foods.

== Proposed mechanism of action of Axona ==
Alzheimer's disease is clinically characterized by a progressive decline in memory and language, and pathologically by accumulation of senile plaques and neurofibrillary tangles. Because Alzheimer's disease is also characterized by a reduced ability of some areas of the brain to use glucose, some scientists have proposed that treatments targeting metabolic deficits in the brain of Alzheimer's patients may have efficacy.

The makers of Axona claim that after oral administration of Axona, the caprylic triglyceride in Axona are processed by enzymes in the gut, and the resulting medium-chain fatty acids (MCFAs) are absorbed into the blood supply leading to the liver. The MCFAs rapidly pass directly to the liver, where they undergo oxidation to form ketones. Since the liver does not use ketones, they are released into the circulation to be used by nonliver tissues. These ketones can cross the blood-brain barrier and are then taken up by brain cells. While glucose is the brain's chief energy source, ketones normally serve as the "backup" energy source.

Ketones act as an alternative energy source for brain cells that have an impaired ability to use glucose (sugar) as a result of Alzheimer's disease, and the makers of Axona claim that this may have medical benefits.

== Clinical trials ==
Axona has been evaluated in Phase II clinical trials, paid for and conducted by Cerecin, only one of which was published in an open-access journal in 2009.

== Sales and marketing ==
The product launched in 2009. By 2012 it was being administered to about 30,000 patients in the US.

== Criticism ==
A 2011 story by ABC News noted widespread concern about Axona in the medical community, with some calling it "snake oil."

The theory that the brain in Alzheimer's disease patients is better able to use ketones than glucose is not widely accepted among AD clinicians and researchers.

The Alzheimer's Association has classified Axona an "alternative treatment", has "expressed concern that there is not enough evidence to assess the potential benefit of medical foods for Alzheimer’s disease", and notes that the safety of Axona is not regulated in the way that drugs are.

Glenn Smith, Ph.D., a clinical neuropsychiatrist at the Mayo Clinic, also noted that Axona's safety and efficacy are not known, and noted that "the Alzheimer's Association doesn't recommend the use of medical foods, including Axona, for the treatment of Alzheimer's disease."

In 2013, FDA determined that Axona is misbranded under section 403(a)(1) of the Federal Food, Drug, and Cosmetic Act [21 U.S.C. § 343(a)(1)] because the labeling is false and misleading in that the product is labeled and marketed as a medical food but does not meet the statutory definition of a medical food.

== See also ==
- Ketogenic diet
