= Carpronium chloride =

Chemical compound

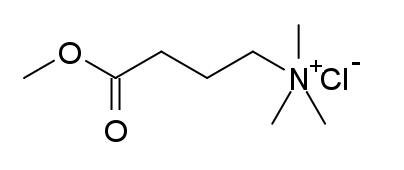

Clinical data
- AHFS/Drugs.com: International Drug Names
- ATC code: none

Legal status
- Legal status: In general: ℞ (Prescription only)

Identifiers
- IUPAC name: (4-methoxy-4-oxobutyl)-trimethylazanium chloride
- CAS Number: 13254-33-6
- PubChem CID: 25804
- ChemSpider: 24040
- UNII: 1R01BKB74A
- ChEBI: CHEBI:31362
- ChEMBL: ChEMBL2105982
- CompTox Dashboard (EPA): DTXSID1046924
- ECHA InfoCard: 100.032.934

Chemical and physical data
- Formula: C_{8}H_{18}ClNO_{2}
- Molar mass: 195.69 g·mol^{−1}
- 3D model (JSmol): Interactive image
- SMILES: C[N+](C)(C)CCCC(=O)OC.[Cl-]
- InChI: InChI=1S/C8H18NO2.ClH/c1-9(2,3)7-5-6-8(10)11-4;/h5-7H2,1-4H3;1H/q+1;/p-1; Key:RZMKWKZIJJNSLQ-UHFFFAOYSA-M

Carpronium chloride (INN) is a hair growth reagent with a vasodilatory action.
