= Carbubarb =

Chemical compound

Clinical data
- Trade names: Nogexan
- Other names: Carbubarbital
- ATC code: none

Identifiers
- IUPAC name: 2-(5-butyl-2,4,6-trioxo-1,3-diazinan-5-yl)ethyl carbamate
- CAS Number: 960-05-4
- PubChem CID: 13743
- ChemSpider: 13148
- UNII: SIW4YR11ST
- ChEMBL: ChEMBL2104020
- CompTox Dashboard (EPA): DTXSID70242076

Chemical and physical data
- Formula: C_{11}H_{17}N_{3}O_{5}
- Molar mass: 271.273 g·mol^{−1}
- 3D model (JSmol): Interactive image
- SMILES: CCCCC1(C(=O)NC(=O)NC1=O)CCOC(=O)N
- InChI: InChI=1S/C11H17N3O5/c1-2-3-4-11(5-6-19-9(12)17)7(15)13-10(18)14-8(11)16/h2-6H2,1H3,(H2,12,17)(H2,13,14,15,16,18); Key:ZWGPHQZXAPWKOV-UHFFFAOYSA-N

Carbubarb (carbubarbital, trade name Nogexan) is a carbamate-substituted barbiturate derivative, which has sedative effects.
