= 4,4′-Methylenebis(N,N-diglycidylaniline) =

Names
- Preferred IUPAC name 4,4′-Methylenebis[N,N-bis(oxiranylmethyl)aniline]
- Other names TGDDM; tetraglycidyl-4,4′-methylenedianiline

Identifiers
CAS Number	28768-32-3
3D model (JSmol)	Interactive image
ChEMBL	ChEMBL3186444
ChemSpider	82703
ECHA InfoCard	100.044.717
EC Number	249-204-3
PubChem CID	91593
UNII	2I8ZB2RX2U
CompTox Dashboard (EPA)	DTXSID0042248
- InChI: InChI=1S/C25H30N2O4/c1-5-20(26(10-22-14-28-22)11-23-15-29-23)6-2-18(1)9-19-3-7-21(8-4-19)27(12-24-16-30-24)13-25-17-31-25/h1-8,22-25H,9-17H2
- SMILES: C1C(O1)CN(CC2CO2)C3=CC=C(C=C3)CC4=CC=C(C=C4)N(CC5CO5)CC6CO6

Properties
Chemical formula	C_{25}H_{30}N_{2}O_{4}
Molar mass	422.52 g/mol
Appearance	Yellow sticky liquid
Density	1.15 g/cm^{3} (25 °C)
Boiling point	619.3 °C (760 mm Hg)
log P	2.4854
Vapor pressure	2.9×10^{−15} mm Hg (25 °C)
- Except where otherwise noted, data are given for materials in their standard state (at 25 °C [77 °F], 100 kPa). Infobox references

4,4′-Methylenebis(N,N-diglycidylaniline), commonly abbreviated as 4-DGA or TGDDM, is a tetrafunctional aniline-based epoxy resin monomer. It can undergo ring-opening polymerization with various acid anhydride curing agents—such as methyl tetrahydrophthalic anhydride (MTHPA), methylhexahydrophthalic anhydride (MHHPA), maleic anhydride, and glutaric anhydride—to form highly crosslinked thermosetting networks. TGDDM not only contributes rigid aromatic rings that help adjust the glass transition temperature (Tg) of the network but also provides tertiary amine groups that can catalyze the virtrification process and transesterification reactions.
