= Carglumic acid =

Chemical compound

Clinical data
- Trade names: Carbaglu, Ucedane
- Other names: (S)-2-ureidopentanedioic acid
- AHFS/Drugs.com: Monograph
- License data: US DailyMed: Carglumic acid
- Pregnancy category: AU: B1
- Routes of administration: By mouth
- ATC code: A16AA05 (WHO)

Legal status
- Legal status: AU: S4 (Prescription only); CA: ℞-only; US: ℞-only; EU: Rx-only

Pharmacokinetic data
- Bioavailability: 30%
- Protein binding: Undetermined
- Metabolism: Partial
- Elimination half-life: 4.3 to 9.5 hours
- Excretion: Fecal (60%) and kidney (9%, unchanged)

Identifiers
- IUPAC name: (2S)-2-(carbamoylamino)pentanedioic acid
- CAS Number: 1188-38-1
- PubChem CID: 121396
- IUPHAR/BPS: 7458
- DrugBank: DB06775
- ChemSpider: 1265942; 108351
- UNII: 5L0HB4V1EW
- KEGG: D07130
- ChEBI: CHEBI:71028
- ChEMBL: ChEMBL1201780
- CompTox Dashboard (EPA): DTXSID7046706
- ECHA InfoCard: 100.116.323

Chemical and physical data
- Formula: C_{6}H_{10}N_{2}O_{5}
- Molar mass: 190.155 g·mol^{−1}
- 3D model (JSmol): Interactive image
- SMILES: C(CC(=O)O)[C@@H](C(=O)O)NC(=O)N
- InChI: InChI=1S/C6H10N2O5/c7-6(13)8-3(5(11)12)1-2-4(9)10/h3H,1-2H2,(H,9,10)(H,11,12)(H3,7,8,13)/t3-/m0/s1; Key:LCQLHJZYVOQKHU-VKHMYHEASA-N

Carglumic acid, sold under the brand name Carbaglu among others, is used for the treatment of hyperammonaemia. Carglumic acid is a carbamoyl phosphate synthetase 1 (CPS 1) activator.

The most common adverse effects include vomiting, abdominal pain, pyrexia (fever), and tonsillitis, anemia, diarrhea, ear infection, other infections, nasopharyngitis, decreased hemoglobin levels, and headache.

It was approved for medical use in the United States in March 2010. Carglumic acid is an orphan drug. It is available as a generic medication.

== Medical uses ==
Carglumic acid is indicated for the treatment of acute hyperammonemia and chronic hyperammonemia.
