= Fluorescein-labeled proaerolysin =

Fluorescein-labeled proaerolysin (FLAER) is used in a flow cytometric assay to diagnose paroxysmal nocturnal hemoglobinuria (PNH). The assay takes advantage of the action of proaerolysin, a prototoxin of aerolysin, a virulence factor of the bacterium Aeromonas hydrophila. Proaerolysin binds to the glycophosphatidylinositol(GPI) anchor in the plasma membrane of cells. Cells affected by PNH lack GPI anchoring proteins, and thus are not bound by proaerolysin. Of note, the FLAER-based assay is not suitable for evaluation of erythrocytes and platelets in PNH but flow cytometry assays based on CD55, CD59 and others are suitable.
