= Clindamycin/adapalene/benzoyl peroxide =

Medication

Combination of
- Clindamycin: Lincosamide antibacterial
- Adapalene: Retinoid
- Benzoyl peroxide: Oxidizing agent

Clinical data
- Trade names: Cabtreo
- AHFS/Drugs.com: Cabtreo
- License data: US DailyMed: clindamycin phosphate/benzoyl peroxide/adapalene
- Routes of administration: Topical
- ATC code: D10AF51 (WHO), D10AD53 (WHO), D10AE51 (WHO)

Legal status
- Legal status: CA: ℞-only; US: ℞-only

Identifiers
- KEGG: D12969

Clindamycin/adapalene/benzoyl peroxide, sold under the brand name Cabtreo, is a fixed-dose combination medication used for the treatment of acne. It contains clindamycin 1.2%, as the phosphate, a lincosamide antibacterial; adapalene 0.15%, a synthetic retinoid; and benzoyl peroxide 3.1%, an oxidizing agent. It is applied to the skin.

Clindamycin/adapalene/benzoyl peroxide was approved for medical use in the United States in October 2023. It is the first triple-combination topical acne treatment approved by the US Food and Drug Administration.
