= Atiprosin =

Chemical compound

Clinical data
- Other names: AY-28,228
- Routes of administration: Oral
- ATC code: none

Identifiers
- IUPAC name: (4aR,12bS)-1-ethyl-12-methyl-4-(propan-2-yl)-1,2,3,4,4a,5,6,12b-octahydropyrazino[2',3':3,4]pyrido[1,2-a]indole
- CAS Number: 89303-63-9
- PubChem CID: 71770
- ChemSpider: 64808
- UNII: ALS52889WF
- ChEMBL: ChEMBL2111172

Chemical and physical data
- Formula: C_{20}H_{29}N_{3}
- Molar mass: 311.473 g·mol^{−1}
- 3D model (JSmol): Interactive image
- SMILES: n23c1ccccc1c(c2[C@H]4N(CCN([C@@H]4CC3)C(C)C)CC)C
- InChI: InChI=1S/C20H29N3/c1-5-21-12-13-22(14(2)3)18-10-11-23-17-9-7-6-8-16(17)15(4)19(23)20(18)21/h6-9,14,18,20H,5,10-13H2,1-4H3/t18-,20+/m1/s1; Key:WXNVFYIBELASJW-QUCCMNQESA-N

Atiprosin (developmental code name AY-28,228) is an antihypertensive agent which acts as a selective α_{1}-adrenergic receptor antagonist. It also possesses some antihistamine activity, though it is some 15-fold weaker in this regard than as an alpha blocker. It was never marketed.

== See also ==
- Prazosin
- Ketanserin
