= Calmurid =

Topical cream manufactured by Galderma

Calmurid was the name of a skin cream manufactured by Galderma (now discontinued due to safety reasons). Calmurid Cream contained the active ingredients lactic acid and urea, whereas Calmurid HC contained an additional ingredient, the mild corticosteroid hydrocortisone.

Owing to lactic acid's keratolytic properties (to break down hard skin cells) and urea's hydrating properties, Calmurid was used primarily in the treatment of dry, scaly skin. Ichthyosis and general dermatitis in the absence of inflammation are some of its indications.

When the extra steroid component is added (as in Calmurid HC), it was used to treat dry, scaly skin that is accompanied by inflammation of the skin. This may include various forms of eczema. The presence of a corticosteroid, however, means that the cream needed to be used sparingly and only for the shortest time period due to possible side effects that could occur due to systemic absorption of the steroid.

Composition: Urea 100 mg/g and lactic acid 50 mg/g in an emulsified base containing betaine monohydrate, glyceryl monostearate, diethanolamine cetylphosphate complex, hard fat, cholesterol, sodium chloride, purified water.
