= Carvotroline =

Clinical data
- Other names: WY-47791; WY47791; Wy-47791
- Routes of administration: Unknown
- Drug class: Dopamine D_{2} receptor antagonist; Serotonin 5-HT_{2A} receptor antagonist
- ATC code: None

Identifiers
- IUPAC name: 8-fluoro-2-(2-pyridin-4-ylethyl)-1,3,4,5-tetrahydropyrido[4,3-b]indole
- CAS Number: 107266-08-0
- PubChem CID: 72038
- DrugBank: DB19640
- ChemSpider: 65031
- UNII: 1Q63WWP8G5
- ChEMBL: ChEMBL300443
- CompTox Dashboard (EPA): DTXSID10147990

Chemical and physical data
- Formula: C_{18}H_{18}FN_{3}
- Molar mass: 295.361 g·mol^{−1}
- 3D model (JSmol): Interactive image
- SMILES: C1CN(CC2=C1NC3=C2C=C(C=C3)F)CCC4=CC=NC=C4
- InChI: InChI=1S/C18H18FN3/c19-14-1-2-17-15(11-14)16-12-22(10-6-18(16)21-17)9-5-13-3-7-20-8-4-13/h1-4,7-8,11,21H,5-6,9-10,12H2; Key:PMXOASNGMJAYTN-UHFFFAOYSA-N

Carvotroline (INN; developmental code name WY-47791) is a dopamine D_{2} receptor antagonist and serotonin 5-HT_{2A} receptor antagonist which was under development as a potential antipsychotic but was never marketed. It showed modest or moderate affinity for the dopamine D_{2} and serotonin 5-HT_{2} receptors and produced antipsychotic-like effects in animals. The drug was being developed by Wyeth. It reached phase 1 clinical trials prior to the discontinuation of its development. Carvotroline was first described in the scientific literature by 1991.

== See also ==
- Substituted γ-carboline
- Gevotroline
