= Candex =

Candex is a dietary supplement manufactured by Pure Essence Laboratories. It is marketed as an enzymatic remedy to treat the yeast infection candida. Having the status of a dietary supplement, its efficiency has not been proven in scientifically controlled and peer-reviewed trials. Similar formulas exist, such as Candigest.

== Mechanism of action ==
Candex contains the fibre digesting enzymes, cellulase and hemicellulase. The manufacturer claims because yeast cell walls are built mainly of fibre, which is mostly made of the complex carbohydrate, cellulose, cellulase and hemicellulase are capable of killing yeast.

However, a review of the scientific literature suggests that this mechanism of action is unlikely to be true. For while plant cell walls are made predominantly of cellulose, yeast cell walls are not (yeast are classified as fungi). For example, in the article, "Synthesis of the yeast cell wall and its regulation" in the Annual Review of Biochemistry, there is mention of many other complex carbohydrates found in yeast cell walls, but there is no mention of cellulose nor is cellulose mentioned as a cell wall component in candida albicans, the yeast strain most frequently associated with human fungal infections. Indeed, scientists have even modified yeast cells so they can make their own cellulases. This allows the modified yeast to ferment widely available plant material, which is made mostly of cellulose, and turn plant cellulose into alcohol for biofuels (cellulosic ethanol). One scientific article even called yeast an "ideal host strain" for producing cellulases. This is consistent with cellulase not being toxic to yeast and no mention was made of any toxic effect of cellulases on the modified yeast.

Furthermore, while many internet sites claim that cellulase enzymes might degrade the chitin found in yeast cell walls, once again no evidence is presented for this. Enzymes are known to be highly specific and in general cellulases have not been found to be active on chitin. To quote one scientific article: "The purified cellulase was devoid of chitinase, pectinase and mannanase activities". Moreover, in contrast to the previously mentioned fact that yeast bioengineered to make cellulases remain healthy, when a chitinase gene was bioengineered into the same yeast strain it resulted in complete growth inhibition. This again suggests cellulases do not in general contain significant chitinase activity.

Similarly, although many internet sites claim cellulase degrades yeast biofilms, no peer-reviewed scientific evidence was offered in support of this. The exact chemical composition of yeast biofilms remains poorly understood and although there is evidence for it containing many different types of polysaccharides, there was no evidence presented that it contains cellulose or is susceptible to cellulase digest.

The manufacturer further claims Candex enzymes kill yeast but don't stimulate the yeast to release toxins, thereby avoiding unpleasant die-off reactions, contrary to using fungicidal drugs and herbs. But once again, there is no reference to a peer-reviewed scientific journal to support these claims. An alternative explanation might be that there are no unpleasant die-off reactions simply because the Candex enzymes do not effectively kill yeast.

The remaining enzymes found in Candex: amylase, glucoamylase, diastase, and invertase are involved in basic carbohydrate and sugar metabolic pathways and are not involved in cell wall lysis. For example, Invertase catalyzes the conversion of sucrose (common table sugar) into glucose and fructose. Much of the invertase used in the food industry is actually purified from yeast itself as yeast contain an abundance of their own naturally produced invertase.

Candex is sold in sizes of 40 or 120 capsules. 4 capsules equal one daily dose, which may later be reduced. 4 capsules contain:

Ingredient	Dose
Vegetarian Cellulase	148,000 CU
Vegetarian Hemicellulase	60,000 HCU
Vegetarian Amylase	8000 DU
Vegetarian Glucoamylase	400 mg
Vegetarian Invertase	1200 SU
Vegetarian Malt Diastase	400 DP

== Drug status ==
Being classified as a dietary supplement, it is not approved by the US Food and Drug Administration to diagnose, treat, or prevent any condition of disease.

=== Trials and tests ===
A non-verified study from 2002 by the Progressive Medical Group claims that after testing the remedy on 52 patients, all of them had "at least minimal improvement not only in any upper gastrointestinal symptoms (probably associated with the natural digestive enzyme), but also in lower gastrointestinal symptoms and yeast-associated problems (altered cognition, craving carbohydrates, arthralgias, myalgias, allergies, etc.)." The study claims that side effects were "minimal with only rare gastrointestinal symptoms (nausea, etc.) that resolved when association with food intake was altered", and that these side effects were deemed to not be statistically significant. The study has not been reviewed by scientific peers, nor published in medical journals. Some have questioned its usefulness due to the lack of a control group.

As of January 2007, no peer reviewed articles were indexed by the National Library of Medicine referencing Candex.
