= Carmantadine =

Abandoned antiparkinsonian drug of the adamantane group

Clinical data
- Other names: SCH-15427; NSC-172618

Identifiers
- IUPAC name: 1-(1-adamantyl)azetidine-2-carboxylic acid
- CAS Number: 38081-67-3
- PubChem CID: 37906
- ChemSpider: 34751
- UNII: 6EK3N87MMH
- KEGG: D03407
- ChEMBL: ChEMBL2106463
- CompTox Dashboard (EPA): DTXSID00865898
- ECHA InfoCard: 100.048.869

Chemical and physical data
- Formula: C_{14}H_{21}NO_{2}
- Molar mass: 235.327 g·mol^{−1}
- 3D model (JSmol): Interactive image
- SMILES: C1CN(C1C(=O)O)C23CC4CC(C2)CC(C4)C3
- InChI: InChI=1S/C14H21NO2/c16-13(17)12-1-2-15(12)14-6-9-3-10(7-14)5-11(4-9)8-14/h9-12H,1-8H2,(H,16,17); Key:VPBLOJFGPORKQA-UHFFFAOYSA-N

Carmantadine (INN, USAN; developmental code name SCH-15427) is an antiparkinsonian agent of the adamantane group that was never marketed. It is structurally related to amantadine and shares some of its pharmacological actions. Another related drug is dopamantine. Carmantadine was first described by 1972 and is said to have reached early clinical trials.
