= Geographic atrophy =

Advanced form of age-related macular degeneration

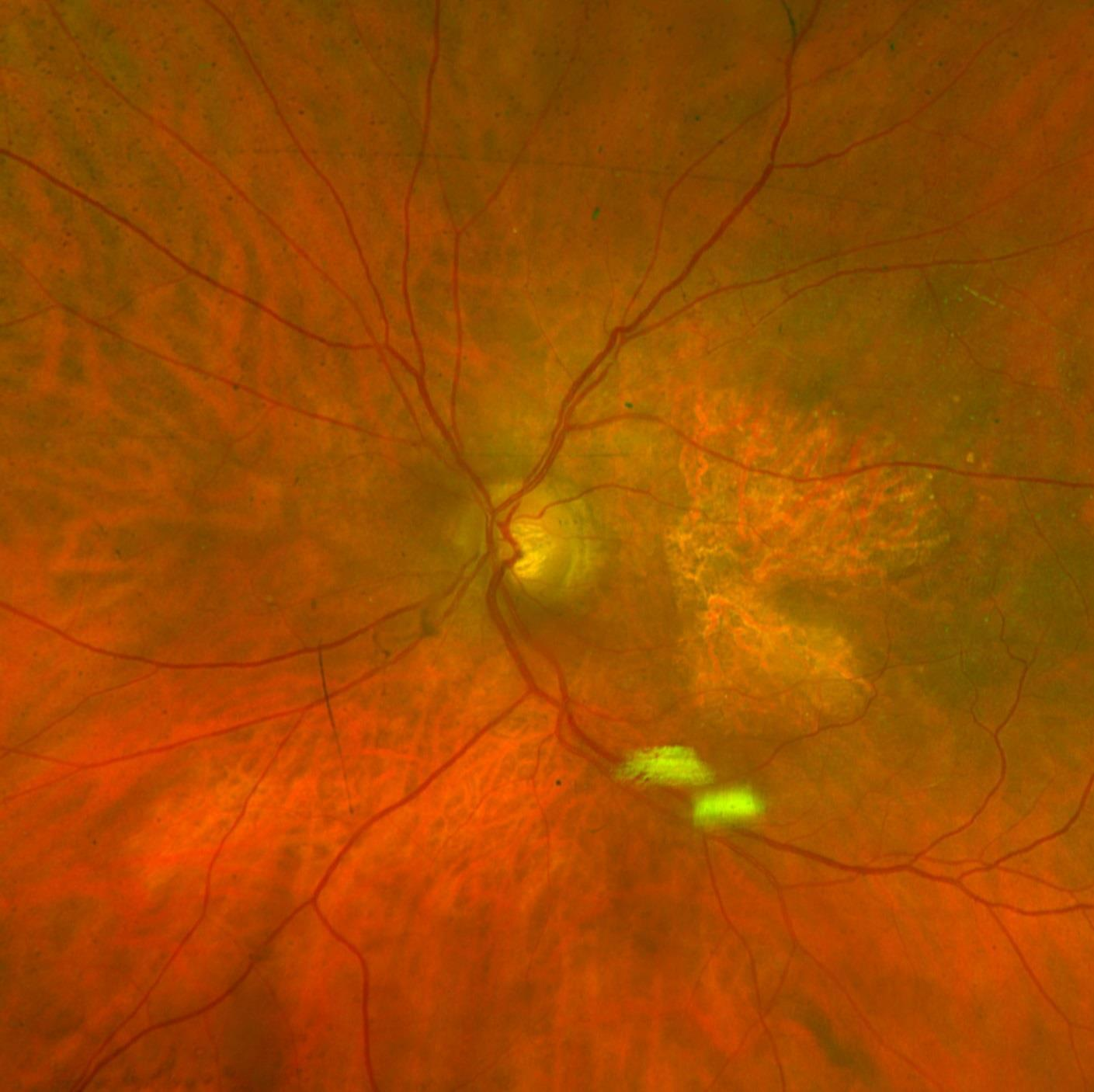
- Fundus of geographic atrophy
- Specialty: Ophthalmology

Geographic atrophy (GA), also known as atrophic age-related macular degeneration (AMD) or advanced dry AMD, is an advanced form of age-related macular degeneration that can result in the progressive and irreversible loss of retinal tissue (photoreceptors, retinal pigment epithelium, choriocapillaris) which can lead to a loss of central vision over time. It is estimated that GA affects over 5 million people worldwide and approximately 1 million patients in the US, which is similar to the prevalence of neovascular (wet) AMD, the other advanced form of the disease.

The incidence of advanced AMD, both geographic atrophy and neovascular AMD, increases exponentially with age. Most current clinical trials aim to reduce the progression of GA lesion enlargement.

The name derives from the resemblance of the regions of atrophied cells to a geographical map.

== Presentation ==
Geographic atrophy is a chronic disease that leads to visual function loss centrally. This often results in difficulties performing daily tasks such as reading, recognizing faces, and driving, and ultimately has severe consequences on independence.

Initially, patients often have good visual acuity if the GA lesions are not involved in the central macular, or fovea, region of the retina. As such, a standard vision test may underrepresent the visual deficit experienced by patients who report challenges reading, driving or seeing in low light conditions. Reading speed is often initially unaffected due to foveal sparing, but worsens progressively as the area of atrophy enlarges. As the disease progresses, vision-related quality-of-life declines markedly.

While fluorescein angiography and optical coherence tomography are today well established for diagnosing and tracking progression in geographic atrophy more complex diagnostic assessments may be required in the context of clinical trials. In February 2023, the FDA approved Pegcetacoplan for the treatment of people with geographic atrophy secondary to age-related macular degeneration.

== Risk factors ==
A plethora of in vivo risk factors for GA progression have been published and validated.

Recent studies indicate that geographic atrophy may be due to deficiencies in blood flow within the choriocapillaris. These studies used swept-source optical coherence tomography angiography to examine the choriocapillaris. Using imaging algorithms, they then determined which regions of the choriocapillaris had deficient blood flow, thus creating a heat map of the blood supply to the retinal pigment epithelium. They went on to use fundus autofluorescence to image the retinal pigment epithelium over a year, this allowed them to map out the direction and magnitude with the geographic atrophy spread. They then found that regions of the choriocapillaris that had less blood flow were more likely to degenerate and become geographic atrophy. Since the choriocapillaris is the main blood supply of the retinal pigment epithelium in the macula, which has no retinal blood supply, it is leading some to believe that geographic atrophy is primarily an ischemic disease (disease due to decreased blood flow).

It was also shown that non-exudative neovascular membranes, which can recapitulate the choriocapillaris, are associated with a markedly slower GA progression. This further supports the vascular insufficiency hypothesis.

== Pathogenesis ==
The pathogenesis of GA is not fully understood yet. It is likely multifactorial and triggered by intrinsic and extrinsic stressors of the poorly regenerative retinal pigment epithelium (RPE), particularly oxidative stress caused by the high metabolic demand of photoreceptors, photo-oxidation, and environmental stressors such as cigarette smoke. Variations in several genes, particularly in the complement system, increase the risk of developing GA. This is an active area of research but the current hypothesis is that with aging, damage caused by these stressors accumulates, which coupled with a genetic predisposition, results in the appearance of drusen and lipofuscin deposits (early and intermediate AMD). These and other products of oxidative stress can trigger inflammation via multiple pathways, particularly the complement cascade, ultimately leading to loss of photoreceptors, RPE, and choriocapillaris, culminating in atrophic lesions that grow over time.

Age-related macular degeneration (AMD) is characterized by retinal iron accumulation and lipid peroxidation. Ferroptosis is initiated by lipid peroxidation and is characterized by iron-dependent accumulation. Studies on iron accumulation and elevated lipid peroxidation in the aging retina, and their intimate role in ferroptosis, have implicated ferroptosis in AMD pathogenesis.

== Diagnosis ==
Diagnosis of geographic atrophy is made by an ophthalmologist or optometrist in the clinic. Fundus autofluorescence and optical coherence tomography angiography are imaging modalities that can be used in the diagnosis. While fundus autofluorescence is the standard modality for viewing geographic atrophy, optical coherence tomography can offer unique benefits. Optical coherence tomography angiography can help the physician see if there is any subretinal fluid in the eye. This is useful because it could indicate that the patient may be developing wet AMD. Since patients with geographic atrophy are at higher risk for developing advanced wet AMD (neovascular AMD), this could be especially useful in the monitoring of patients with geographic atrophy. If signs of neovascular AMD are found, the physician can initiate treatment of wet age-related macular degeneration.

=== Quantification of GA progression ===
Traditionally, GA progression is quantified in terms of the area of retinal pigment epithelium atrophy. Multiple imaging methods can be applied to quantify this area of retinal pigment epithelium atrophy including short-wavelength (blue) fundus autofluorescence imaging, green fundus autofluorescence imaging, and en face optical coherence tomography imaging.

However, more recent data suggest that photoreceptor degeneration is not limited to the area of retinal pigment epithelium atrophy, but extends beyond this area. These more subtle changes can be quantified by volumetric analyses of optical coherence tomography data.

== Treatment ==
In February 2023, Apellis Pharmaceuticals received the first FDA approval of pegcetacoplan for the treatment of this condition.

Avacincaptad pegol (Izervay) was approved in the United States in August 2023 for the treatment of geographic atrophy secondary to age-related macular degeneration.

== Research ==
It was recently discovered that the aging pigment lipofuscin can be broken down with the help of melanin and drugs through a newly discovered mechanism (chemical excitation). The pigment lipofuscin plays a central role in the development of dry AMD and geographic atrophy. This breakdown can be supported by medication. This discovery can be translated into the development of a therapy to treat dry AMD.
