= Dopamantine =

Antiparkinsonian drug

Clinical data
- Other names: SCH-15507; Sch 15507; N-Adamantanoyl dopamine; NSC-172619

Identifiers
- IUPAC name: N-[2-(3,4-dihydroxyphenyl)ethyl]adamantane-1-carboxamide
- CAS Number: 39907-68-1
- PubChem CID: 38361
- ChemSpider: 35160
- UNII: 7EZN745FXZ
- KEGG: D03890
- ChEMBL: ChEMBL2106204
- CompTox Dashboard (EPA): DTXSID70192961
- ECHA InfoCard: 100.049.707

Chemical and physical data
- Formula: C_{19}H_{25}NO_{3}
- Molar mass: 315.413 g·mol^{−1}
- 3D model (JSmol): Interactive image
- SMILES: C1C2CC3CC1CC(C2)(C3)C(=O)NCCC4=CC(=C(C=C4)O)O
- InChI: InChI=1S/C19H25NO3/c21-16-2-1-12(8-17(16)22)3-4-20-18(23)19-9-13-5-14(10-19)7-15(6-13)11-19/h1-2,8,13-15,21-22H,3-7,9-11H2,(H,20,23); Key:ZWKFENYDXISLGK-UHFFFAOYSA-N

Dopamantine (INN, USAN; developmental code name SCH-15507; also known as N-adamantanoyl dopamine) is an antiparkinsonian drug of the adamantane group that developed for treatment of Parkinson's disease but was never marketed. It was developed and studied in the 1970s and was said to have reached early clinical trials.

Dopamantine combines elements of the chemical structures of clinically used adamantane antiparkinsonian agents like amantadine and dopamine or levodopa (L-DOPA) into a single molecule. It is said to have been designed to help dopamine cross the blood–brain barrier via the lipophilic adamantane moiety. The drug is said to share pharmacological effects with amantadine. Another related compound is carmantadine, which is also an adamantane antiparkinsonian agent that was never marketed.
