= Iptacopan =

Chemical compound

- Skeletal structure of iptacopan

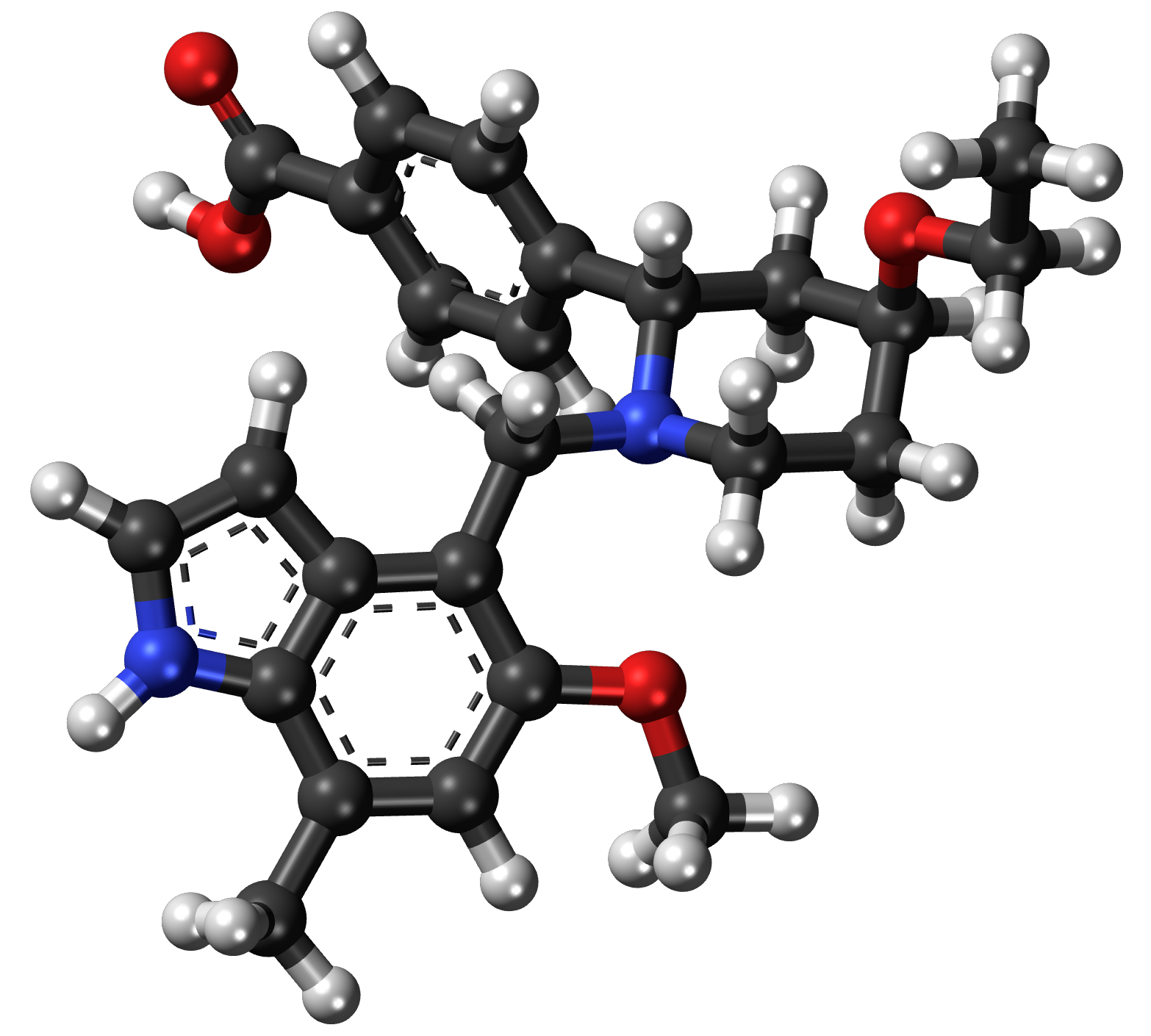
- 3D representation of an iptacopan molecule

Clinical data
- Trade names: Fabhalta
- Other names: LNP023
- AHFS/Drugs.com: Fabhalta
- License data: US DailyMed: Iptacopan
- Pregnancy category: AU: B1
- Routes of administration: By mouth
- Drug class: Complement factor B inhibitor
- ATC code: L04AJ08 (WHO)

Legal status
- Legal status: AU: S4 (Prescription only); CA: ℞-only; US: ℞-only; EU: Rx-only

Identifiers
- IUPAC name: 4-{(2S,4S)-4-ethoxy-1-[(5-methoxy-7-methyl-1H-indol-4-yl)methyl]piperidin-2-yl}benzoic acid
- CAS Number: 1644670-37-0
- PubChem CID: 90467622
- DrugBank: DB16200
- ChemSpider: 75533872
- UNII: 8E05T07Z6W
- KEGG: D12251; D12252
- ChEMBL: ChEMBL4594448
- PDB ligand: JGQ (PDBe, RCSB PDB)

Chemical and physical data
- Formula: C_{25}H_{30}N_{2}O_{4}
- Molar mass: 422.525 g·mol^{−1}
- 3D model (JSmol): Interactive image
- SMILES: CCO[C@H]1CCN(Cc2c(OC)cc(C)c3[nH]ccc23)[C@H](c2ccc(C(=O)O)cc2)C1
- InChI: InChI=1S/C25H30N2O4/c1-4-31-19-10-12-27(22(14-19)17-5-7-18(8-6-17)25(28)29)15-21-20-9-11-26-24(20)16(2)13-23(21)30-3/h5-9,11,13,19,22,26H,4,10,12,14-15H2,1-3H3,(H,28,29)/t19-,22-/m0/s1; Key:RENRQMCACQEWFC-UGKGYDQZSA-N

Iptacopan, sold under the brand name Fabhalta, is a medication used for the treatment of paroxysmal nocturnal hemoglobinuria and proteinuria. It is a complement factor B inhibitor that was developed by Novartis. It is taken by mouth.

Iptacopan was approved for medical use in the United States in December 2023, and in the European Union in May 2024. The US Food and Drug Administration considers it to be a first-in-class medication.

== Medical uses ==
Iptacopan is indicated for the treatment of adults with paroxysmal nocturnal hemoglobinuria; and to reduce proteinuria in adults with primary immunoglobulin A nephropathy at risk of rapid disease progression, generally a urine protein-to-creatinine ratio ≥1.5 g/g; for the treatment of adults with complement 3 glomerulopathy, to reduce proteinuria.

Complement 3 glomerulopathy is a rare disease that causes inflammation and damage to the kidney glomeruli, which are responsible for filtering blood and producing urine.

== Mechanism of action ==
Iptacopan binds to Factor B of the alternative complement pathway and regulates the cleavage of C3, generation of downstream effectors, and the amplification of the terminal pathway.

In paroxysmal nocturnal hemoglobinuria, intravascular hemolysis is mediated by the downstream membrane attack complex, while extravascular hemolysis is facilitated by C3b opsonization. Iptacopan acts proximally in the alternative pathway of the complement cascade to control both C3b-mediated extravascular hemolysis and terminal complement mediated intravascular hemolysis.

== Side effects ==
The US Food and Drug Administration label for iptacopan contains a boxed warning for the risk of serious and life-threatening infections caused by encapsulated bacteria, including Streptococcus pneumoniae, Neisseria meningitidis, and Haemophilus influenzae type B.

== Society and culture ==
=== Legal status ===
Iptacopan was approved by the US Food and Drug Administration (FDA) for the treatment of adults with paroxysmal nocturnal hemoglobinuria in December 2023.

In March 2024, the Committee for Medicinal Products for Human Use of the European Medicines Agency (EMA) adopted a positive opinion, recommending the granting of a marketing authorization for the medicinal product Fabhalta, intended for the treatment of paroxysmal nocturnal hemoglobinuria. The applicant for this medicinal product is Novartis Europharm Limited. Iptacopan was authorized for medical use in the European Union in May 2024.

In August 2024, the US FDA granted accelerated approval to iptacopan for reducing proteinuria in adults with primary IgA nephropathy.

In March 2025, the US FDA approved iptacopan for the treatment of adults with complement 3 glomerulopathy to reduce proteinuria.

== Research ==
In a clinical study with twelve participants, iptacopan as a single drug led to the normalization of hemolytic markers in most patients, and no serious adverse events occurred during the 12-week study.

Iptacopan is also investigated as a drug in other complement-mediated diseases, like age-related macular degeneration and some types of glomerulopathies.
