= Pegol =

Class of pharmaceutical compounds

Pegol is a term used in generic names for pharmaceutical drugs to indicate the presence of a polyethylene glycol attachment (pegylation). The term is used for monoclonal antibodies and engineered proteins as well as for small molecules. The purpose of the pegylation is to extend the half-life of the drug.

Examples include:

- Alacizumab pegol
- Calaspargase pegol
- Certolizumab pegol
- Etirinotecan pegol
- Lulizumab pegol
