= Carlumab =

Monoclonal antibody

Monoclonal antibody
- Type: Whole antibody
- Source: Human
- Target: MCP-1

Clinical data
- ATC code: none

Identifiers
- CAS Number: 915404-94-3
- ChemSpider: none
- UNII: 6TC1BB2EV9
- KEGG: D09877

Chemical and physical data
- Formula: C_{6442}H_{9966}N_{1706}O_{2018}S_{40}
- Molar mass: 144884.91 g·mol^{−1}

Carlumab (alternate identifier CNTO 888) is a discontinued human recombinant monoclonal antibody (type IgG1 kappa) that targets human CC chemokine ligand 2 (CCL2)/monocyte chemoattractant protein (MCP1). Carlumab was under development for use in the treatment of oncology and immune indications and was studied for application in systemic sclerosis, atherosclerosis, diabetic nephropathy, liver fibrosis and type 2 diabetes.

The inhibitory binding of Carlumab to CCL2 was hypothesized to inhibit angiogenesis and consequently modulate tumor cell proliferation. Studies focusing on the effects of Carlumab have been performed in vitro on cell lines and in vivo on mice and in humans including phase 1 and phase 2 clinical trials evaluating the efficacy, safety and dose requirements of the drug. Clinical trials for Carlumab include studies of idiopathic pulmonary fibrosis, castration-resistant metastatic prostate cancer and solid tumors.

Carlumab was being developed by Janssen Biotech prior to discontinuation in 2012 due to limited success in clinical trials.
