= Canertinib =

Names
- Preferred IUPAC name N-{4-(3-Chloro-4-fluoroanilino)-7-[3-(morpholin-4-yl)propoxy]quinazolin-6-yl}prop-2-enamide
- Other names CI-1033; PD-183805

Identifiers
CAS Number	267243-28-7
3D model (JSmol)	Interactive image
ChEBI	CHEBI:61399
ChEMBL	ChEMBL31965; ChEMBL545315
ChemSpider	137741
IUPHAR/BPS	5675
PubChem CID	156414
UNII	C78W1K5ASF
CompTox Dashboard (EPA)	DTXSID8048943
- InChI: InChI=1S/C24H25ClFN5O3/c1-2-23(32)30-21-13-17-20(14-22(21)34-9-3-6-31-7-10-33-11-8-31)27-15-28-24(17)29-16-4-5-19(26)18(25)12-16/h2,4-5,12-15H,1,3,6-11H2,(H,30,32)(H,27,28,29) Key: OMZCMEYTWSXEPZ-UHFFFAOYSA-N; InChI=1/C24H25ClFN5O3/c1-2-23(32)30-21-13-17-20(14-22(21)34-9-3-6-31-7-10-33-11-8-31)27-15-28-24(17)29-16-4-5-19(26)18(25)12-16/h2,4-5,12-15H,1,3,6-11H2,(H,30,32)(H,27,28,29) Key: OMZCMEYTWSXEPZ-UHFFFAOYAG
- SMILES: Fc1ccc(cc1Cl)Nc4ncnc3cc(OCCCN2CCOCC2)c(NC(=O)\C=C)cc34

Properties
Chemical formula	C_{24}H_{25}ClFN_{5}O_{3}
Molar mass	485.94 g·mol^{−1}
- Except where otherwise noted, data are given for materials in their standard state (at 25 °C [77 °F], 100 kPa). verify (what is ?) Infobox references

Canertinib (CI-1033) is an experimental drug candidate for the treatment of cancer. It is an irreversible tyrosine-kinase inhibitor with activity against EGFR (IC_{50} 0.8 nM), HER-2 (IC_{50} 19 nM) and ErbB-4 (IC_{50} 7 nM). By 2015, Pfizer had discontinued development of the drug.

Canertinib has been reported as a substrate for the transporter protein OATP1B3. Interaction of canertinib with OATP1B3 may alter its hepatic disposition and can lead to transporter mediated drug-drug interactions. Canertinib is not an inhibitor of the OATP1B1 or OATP1B3 transporters.
