= Caproxamine =

Chemical compound

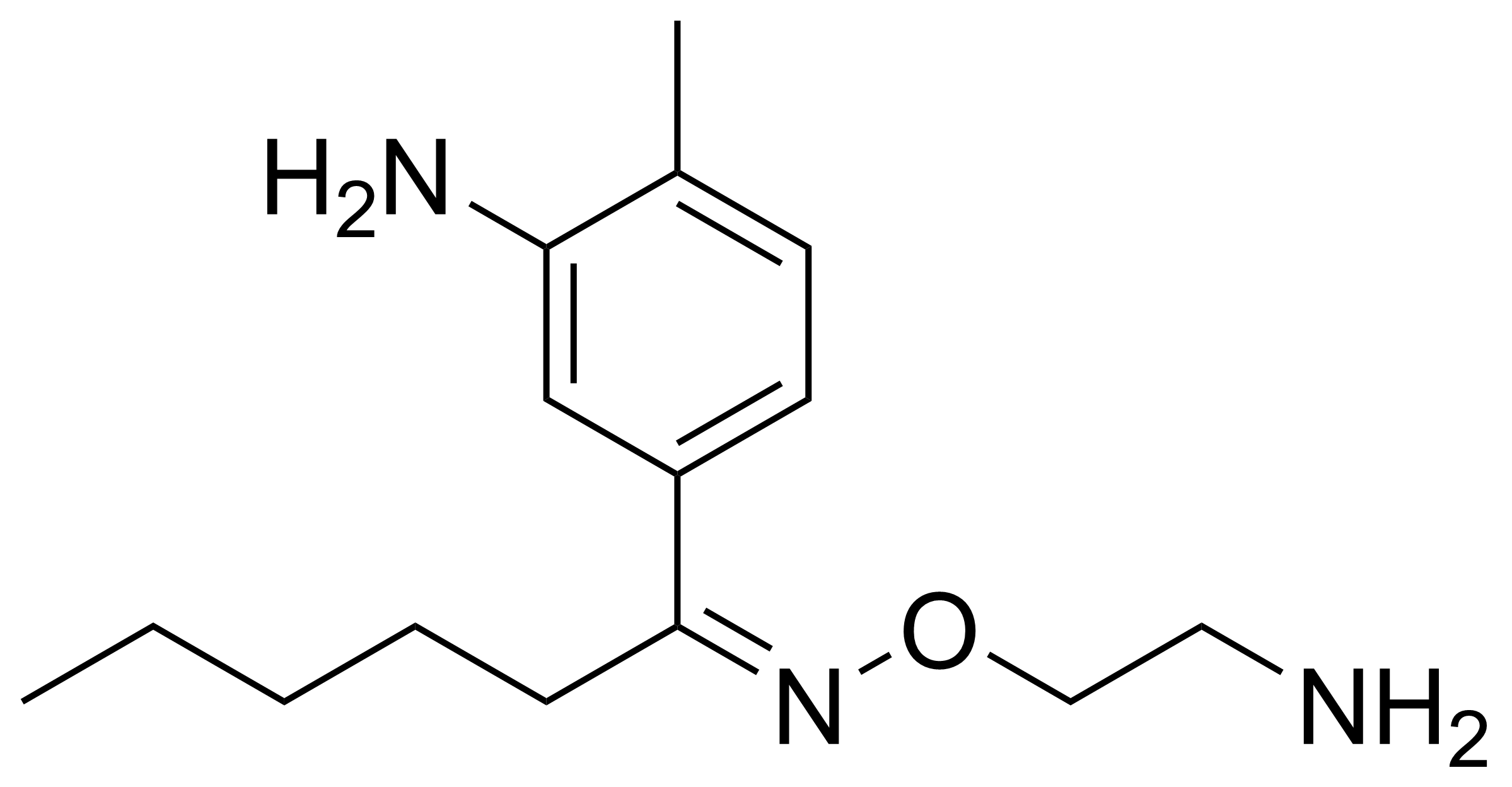

Clinical data
- ATC code: None

Identifiers
- IUPAC name: 5-[(1Z)-N-(2-aminoethoxy)hexanimidoyl]-2-methylaniline
- CAS Number: 53078-44-7
- PubChem CID: 9578268
- ChemSpider: 7852632
- UNII: 7YQT311430
- ChEMBL: ChEMBL2106193

Chemical and physical data
- Formula: C_{15}H_{25}N_{3}O
- Molar mass: 263.385 g·mol^{−1}
- 3D model (JSmol): Interactive image
- SMILES: O(\N=C(/c1cc(N)c(cc1)C)CCCCC)CCN

Caproxamine is a drug which was patented as an antidepressant.
