= Capuride =

Sedative-hypnotic drug

Clinical data
- Other names: Pacinox, valnoctylurea

Identifiers
- IUPAC name: N-carbamoyl-2-ethyl-3-methylpentanamide
- CAS Number: 5579-13-5
- PubChem CID: 231285
- ChemSpider: 201505
- UNII: 3FO9QT93IS
- KEGG: D03377
- ChEBI: CHEBI:134831
- ChEMBL: ChEMBL392861
- CompTox Dashboard (EPA): DTXSID5022728

Chemical and physical data
- Formula: C_{9}H_{18}N_{2}O_{2}
- Molar mass: 186.255 g·mol^{−1}
- 3D model (JSmol): Interactive image
- SMILES: CCC(C)C(CC)C(=O)NC(=O)N
- InChI: InChI=InChI=1S/C9H18N2O2/c1-4-6(3)7(5-2)8(12)11-9(10)13/h6-7H,4-5H2,1-3H3,(H3,10,11,12,13); Key:HLSLSXBFTXUKCY-UHFFFAOYSA-N

Capuride is a synthetic sedative-hypnotic drug of the N-acylurea class, primarily developed and studied as a preanesthetic agent to promote sleep prior to surgery. It has a mechanism and duration of action considered similar to that of short-acting barbiturates, although it is chemically distinct. Clinical studies from the 1970s demonstrated capuride's efficacy in facilitating presurgical sleep, situating it among early modern hypnotic agents, but its clinical use has been superseded by safer alternatives.
