= Ham test =

The Ham test is a blood test used in the diagnosis of paroxysmal nocturnal hemoglobinuria (PNH). Patient red blood cells (RBCs) are placed in mild acid; a positive result (increased RBC fragility) indicates PNH or congenital dyserythropoietic anemia. This is now an obsolete test for diagnosing PNH due to its low sensitivity and specificity.

As one fourth of PNH cases progress to aplastic anemia, Ham's test is occasionally positive in AA.
