= Carpindolol =

Chemical compound

Clinical data
- ATC code: none

Identifiers
- IUPAC name: Isopropyl 4-{2-hydroxy-3-[(2-methyl-2-propanyl)amino]propoxy}-1H-indole-2-carboxylate
- CAS Number: 39731-05-0
- PubChem CID: 193949
- ChemSpider: 168304
- UNII: W8F97XP38W
- ChEMBL: ChEMBL1742440
- CompTox Dashboard (EPA): DTXSID3049041

Chemical and physical data
- Formula: C_{19}H_{28}N_{2}O_{4}
- Molar mass: 348.443 g·mol^{−1}
- 3D model (JSmol): Interactive image
- SMILES: CC(C)OC(=O)C1=CC2=C(N1)C=CC=C2OCC(CNC(C)(C)C)O
- InChI: InChI=1S/C19H28N2O4/c1-12(2)25-18(23)16-9-14-15(21-16)7-6-8-17(14)24-11-13(22)10-20-19(3,4)5/h6-9,12-13,20-22H,10-11H2,1-5H3; Key:SJYFDORQYYEJLB-UHFFFAOYSA-N

Carpindolol is a beta blocker. It also has activity at serotonin receptors, and is unusual in that it acts as an antagonist at the 5-HT_{1B} receptor, but is an agonist at the closely related 5-HT_{1D} receptor.
