= Carbazochrome =

Chemical compound

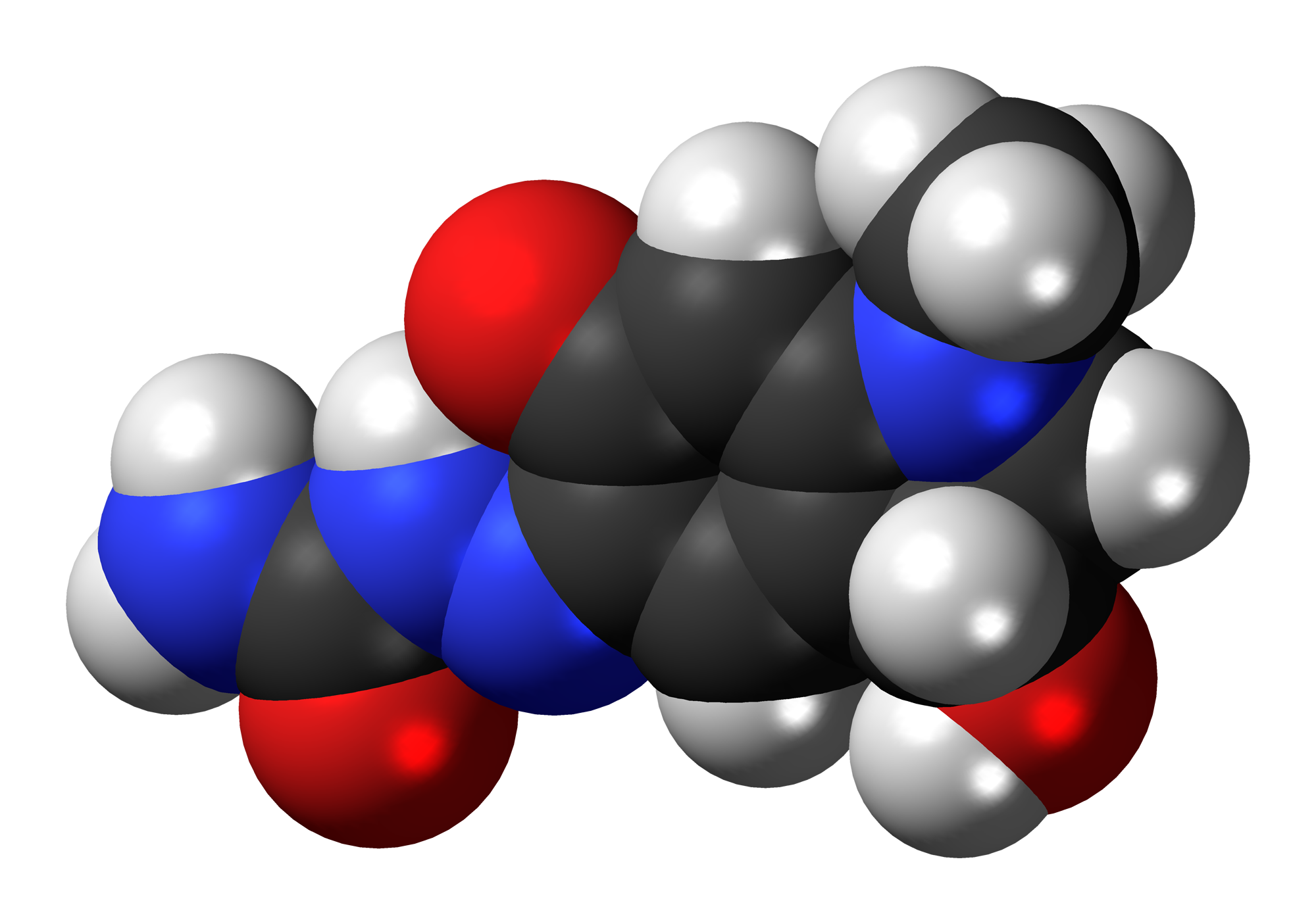

Clinical data
- Trade names: Toxivenol
- AHFS/Drugs.com: International Drug Names
- Routes of administration: P/O, I/M
- ATC code: B02BX02 (WHO)

Identifiers
- IUPAC name: [(3-Hydroxy-1-methyl-6-oxo-2,3-dihydroindol-5-ylidene)amino]urea
- CAS Number: 69-81-8
- PubChem CID: 5360410
- DrugBank: DB09012
- ChemSpider: 4514501
- UNII: 81F061RQS4
- ChEMBL: ChEMBL2051960
- CompTox Dashboard (EPA): DTXSID3048310
- ECHA InfoCard: 100.000.652

Chemical and physical data
- Formula: C_{10}H_{12}N_{4}O_{3}
- Molar mass: 236.231 g·mol^{−1}
- 3D model (JSmol): Interactive image
- SMILES: O=C(N)N/N=C1/C=C2\C(=C/C1=O)N(CC2O)C
- InChI: InChI=1S/C10H12N4O3/c1-14-4-9(16)5-2-6(12-13-10(11)17)8(15)3-7(5)14/h2-3,9,16H,4H2,1H3,(H3,11,13,17)/b12-6-; Key:XSXCZNVKFKNLPR-SDQBBNPISA-N

Carbazochrome is an antihemorrhagic, or hemostatic, agent that will cease blood flow by causing the aggregation and adhesion of platelets in the blood to form a platelet plug, ceasing blood flow from an open wound. It is hoped that this drug can be used in the future for preventing excessive blood flow during surgical operations and the treatment of hemorrhoids, but research on its effectiveness and the severity of possible side effects remains fairly inconclusive.

With troxerutin, it has been investigated for use in the treatment of hemorrhoids.

== Indications ==
Capillary and parenchymal hemorrhage (trauma, tonsillectomy, during surgery), intestinal bleeding, thrombocytopenic purpura.

== Mechanism of action ==
Carbazochrome, the semicarbazone of adrenochrome, that interacts with α-adrenoreceptors on surface of platelets, which are coupled to Gq protein and initiate PLC IP3/DAG pathway to increase intracellular free calcium concentration with these subsequent actions:

- Activates PLA2 and induce arachidonic acid pathway to synthesize endoperoxides (TxA2, thromboxane A2)
- Calcium binds to calmodulin which then binds and activates myosin light-chain kinase, that will enable the myosin crossbridge to bind to the actin filament and allow contraction to begin. This will change platelet's shape and induce release of serotonin, ADP, vWF (Von Willebrand factor), PAF (Platelet-activating factor) to promote further aggregation and adhesion.
