= 2-Acetylbutyrolactone =

- Skeletal formula of 2-acetylbutyrolactone

Names
- Preferred IUPAC name 3-Acetyloxolan-2-one
- Other names 3-acetyldihydrofuran-2(3H)-one; 2-acetyl-γ-butyrolactone c-PrAc

Identifiers
CAS Number	517-23-7
3D model (JSmol)	Interactive image
Abbreviations	ABL
ChEBI	CHEBI:179633
ChEMBL	ChEMBL3187921
ChemSpider	10156
ECHA InfoCard	100.007.488
EC Number	208-235-2
MeSH	2-acetylbutyrolactone
PubChem CID	10601
UNII	I3D73T5K0Q
CompTox Dashboard (EPA)	DTXSID6044436
- InChI: Key: OMQHDIHZSDEIFH-UHFFFAOYSA-N; InChI=1S/C6H8O3/c1-4(7)5-2-3-9-6(5)8/h5H,2-3H2,1H3
- SMILES: CC(=O)C1CCOC1=O

Properties
Chemical formula	C_{6}H_{8}O_{3}
Molar mass	128.127 g·mol^{−1}
Appearance	Colourless liquid
Density	1.19 g/cm^{3}
Boiling point	107–108 °C (225–226 °F; 380–381 K) (at 7 hPa)
Solubility	Soluble in DMF, methanol

Hazards
- GHS labelling
Pictograms	(GHS07: Exclamation mark)
Signal word	Warning
Hazard statements	H315, H319, H335
Precautionary statements	P261, P271, P280, P302+P352, P304+P340, P305+P351+P338, P321, P362+P364, P403+P233, P405, P501
Flash point	113 °C (235 °F; 386 K)
Safety data sheet (SDS)	Sigma-Aldrich SDS
- Except where otherwise noted, data are given for materials in their standard state (at 25 °C [77 °F], 100 kPa). Infobox references

2-Acetylbutyrolactone (ABL) is a derivative of γ-butyrolactone that is used as a precursor in organic synthesis, and it is used to identify primary amines through chemical fluorescence.

== Preparation ==
2-Acetylbutyrolactone can be prepared by a condensation reaction between an ester of acetic acid (such as ethyl acetate) with γ-butyrolactone in an alkaline solution.

2-Acetylbutyrolactone can also be prepared by reacting ethylene oxide with ethyl acetoacetate in alkaline conditions.

== Uses ==
=== Spectrofluorimetry ===
2-Acetylbutyrolactone itself is only slightly fluorescent, but its derivatives show high UV fluorescence. The carbonyl group readily reacts with amines to form Schiff bases. It is for this reason that 2-acetylbutyrolactone is frequently used to confirm the creation of amines during organic synthesis. 2-Acetylbutyrolactone can also undergo a Japp–Klingemann reaction to form fluorescent molecules with arylamines.

=== Drug precursor ===
Uses of 2-Acetylbutyrolactone also includes synthesis of (alphabetical order):

1. Barmastine
2. Coffee furanone
3. Clomethiazole
4. Cyclopropyl methyl ketone (anti-balding).
  1. Also used in recent tebuconazole patents.
  2. Although not actually a drug, c-PrAc is also used in the synthesis of Syntin, a rocket propellant fuel.
5. ID-4708 [42048-72-6]
6. Metrenperone
7. Morocromen (Ex 35)
8. Novoldiamine (1-Diethylamino-4-aminopentane) [140-80-7]
9. Ocaperidone
10. Paliperidone
11. Pirenperone
12. Risperidone
13. Ritanserin
14. R 59-022 [93076-89-2]
15. Santalene
16. Seganserin
17. Setoperone
18. α-methylene-γ-butyrolactones.
