= Lenperone =

Chemical compound

Clinical data
- Trade names: Elanone-V
- Routes of administration: Oral
- ATC code: none

Legal status
- Legal status: In general: ℞ (Prescription only)

Identifiers
- IUPAC name: 4-[4-(4-Fluorobenzoyl)piperidin-1-yl]-1-(4-fluorophenyl)butan-1-one
- CAS Number: 24678-13-5; HCl: 24677-86-9
- PubChem CID: 32593
- ChemSpider: 30207
- UNII: 13P4GX22ES; HCl: 96Q0TL6O3G
- KEGG: D02668
- ChEMBL: ChEMBL316004
- CompTox Dashboard (EPA): DTXSID7046120
- ECHA InfoCard: 100.042.166

Chemical and physical data
- Formula: C_{22}H_{23}F_{2}NO_{2}
- Molar mass: 371.428 g·mol^{−1}
- 3D model (JSmol): Interactive image
- SMILES: C1CN(CCC1C(=O)C2=CC=C(C=C2)F)CCCC(=O)C3=CC=C(C=C3)F
- InChI: InChI=1S/C22H23F2NO2/c23-19-7-3-16(4-8-19)21(26)2-1-13-25-14-11-18(12-15-25)22(27)17-5-9-20(24)10-6-17/h3-10,18H,1-2,11-15H2; Key:WCIBOXFOUGQLFC-UHFFFAOYSA-N

Lenperone (Elanone-V) is a typical antipsychotic of the butyrophenone chemical class. It was first reported as an anti-emetic in 1974, and its use in treatment of acute schizophrenia was reported in 1975. Related early antipsychotic agents include declenperone and milenperone.

Lenperone was never approved by the FDA for use in humans in the United States, but prior to 1989 it was approved for use in veterinary medicine for sedation.

== Synthesis ==
Synthesis of lenperone

A synthesis of lenperone has been reported. The alkylation between 2-(3-chloropropyl)-2-(4-fluorophenyl)-1,3-dioxolane (1) and 4-(4-fluorobenzoyl)piperidine (2) gives 2-(p-fluorophenyl)-2-{3-[4-(p-fluorobenzoyl)piperidino]propyl}-1,3-dioxolane, (3). Deprotection of the ketal function completes the synthesis of lenperone (4).

== See also ==
- Glemanserin
- Pruvanserin
- Roluperidone
- Volinanserin

Chemically related drugs containing the same 4-(p-fluorobenzoyl)piperidine group:

- 4F-4PP
- Altanserin
- Ketanserin
- Setoperone
- Lidanserin
