= C7H5NO =

The molecular formula C_{7}H_{5}NO (molar mass: 119.12 g/mol, exact mass: 119.0371 u) may refer to:

- Anthranil (2,1-benzisoxazole)
- Benzisoxazole
- Benzoxazole
- Phenylisocyanate
