= C20H23N3O2 =

The molecular formula C_{20}H_{23}N_{3}O_{2} (molar mass: 337.41 g/mol, exact mass: 337.1790 u) may refer to:

- ALA-10
- Bitertanol
- LSM-775, or N-Morpholinyllysergamide
- E-52862, or S1RA
- Oxiperomide
- Phenserine
