= 4F-4PP =

Clinical data
- Other names: 4F4PP; FPPO; 4-PBFBP; FBP; 4-(4-Fluorobenzoyl)-1-(4-phenylbutyl)piperidine; N-(4-Phenylbutyl)-4-(4-fluorobenzoyl)piperidine
- Drug class: Serotonin 5-HT_{2A} receptor antagonist
- ATC code: None

Identifiers
- IUPAC name: (4-fluorophenyl)-[1-(4-phenylbutyl)piperidin-4-yl]methanone
- CAS Number: 120357-05-3 144734-36-1 (oxalate)
- PubChem CID: 5234410
- ChemSpider: 4403727
- ChEBI: CHEBI:104176
- ChEMBL: ChEMBL19259

Chemical and physical data
- Formula: C_{22}H_{26}FNO
- Molar mass: 339.454 g·mol^{−1}
- 3D model (JSmol): Interactive image
- SMILES: C1CN(CCC1C(=O)C2=CC=C(C=C2)F)CCCCC3=CC=CC=C3
- InChI: InChI=1S/C22H26FNO/c23-21-11-9-19(10-12-21)22(25)20-13-16-24(17-14-20)15-5-4-8-18-6-2-1-3-7-18/h1-3,6-7,9-12,20H,4-5,8,13-17H2; Key:FTJXZACAQRDRNT-UHFFFAOYSA-N

4F-4PP, or 4F4PP, also known as 4-(4-fluorobenzoyl)-1-(4-phenylbutyl)piperidine, is a selective serotonin 5-HT_{2A} receptor antagonist which is used in scientific research.

== Pharmacology ==
4F-4PP shows high affinity for the serotonin 5-HT_{2A} receptor (K_{i} = 5.3 nM) and 120-fold lower affinity for the serotonin 5-HT_{2C} receptor (K_{i} = 620 nM). For comparison, ketanserin showed only 14-fold higher affinity for the serotonin 5-HT_{2A} receptor over the serotonin 5-HT_{2C} receptor in the same study. In a functional assay, 4F-4PP was 204-fold more potent as a serotonin 5-HT_{2A} receptor antagonist than as a serotonin 5-HT_{2C} receptor antagonist. The drug does not appear to block the serotonin 5-HT_{2B} receptor. It showed limited and non-significant effects on the oxytocin and vasopressin secretion induced by the serotonin 5-HT_{2A} and 5-HT_{2C} receptor agonist and serotonergic psychedelic DOI in rodents.

== Chemistry ==
=== Analogues ===
A radiolabeled isotopologue for use in positron emission tomography (PET) imaging has been described.

== History ==
4F-4PP first described in the scientific literature by 1992. It is an analogue of and was derived via structural modification of ketanserin.

== See also ==
- Serotonin 5-HT_{2A} receptor antagonist
- Lenperone
- Glemanserin
- Lidanserin
- Volinanserin
