= Lidanserin =

Chemical compound

Clinical data
- Other names: ZK-33,839; ZK-33839; ZK33839
- Drug class: Serotonin 5-HT_{2A} receptor antagonist; α_{1}-Adrenergic receptor antagonist
- ATC code: None

Identifiers
- IUPAC name: 4-(3-{3-[4-(4-fluorobenzoyl)-1-piperidinyl]propoxy}-4-methoxyphenyl)-2-pyrrolidinone
- CAS Number: 73725-85-6
- PubChem CID: 68919
- ChemSpider: 62146
- UNII: 80O1E9JZLN
- CompTox Dashboard (EPA): DTXSID60868269

Chemical and physical data
- Formula: C_{26}H_{31}FN_{2}O_{4}
- Molar mass: 454.542 g·mol^{−1}
- 3D model (JSmol): Interactive image
- SMILES: Fc1ccc(cc1)C(=O)C4CCN(CCCOc2cc(ccc2OC)C3CC(=O)NC3)CC4
- InChI: InChI=1S/C26H31FN2O4/c1-32-23-8-5-20(21-16-25(30)28-17-21)15-24(23)33-14-2-11-29-12-9-19(10-13-29)26(31)18-3-6-22(27)7-4-18/h3-8,15,19,21H,2,9-14,16-17H2,1H3,(H,28,30); Key:JDYWZVJXSMADHP-UHFFFAOYSA-N

Lidanserin (INN; ZK-33,839) is a drug which acts as a combined 5-HT_{2A} and α_{1}-adrenergic receptor antagonist. It was developed as an antihypertensive agent but was never marketed.

== See also ==
- Serotonin 5-HT_{2A} receptor antagonist
- Glemanserin
- Pruvanserin
- Roluperidone
- Volinanserin
- Lenperone
- Iloperidone
- Ketanserin
- 4F-4PP
