= ID-4708 =

Butyrophenone neuroleptic

Identifiers
- IUPAC name: 1-(2-amino-4-fluorophenyl)-4-[4-hydroxy-4-[3-(trifluoromethyl)phenyl]piperidin-1-yl]butan-1-one
- CAS Number: 42048-72-6
- PubChem CID: 198237
- ChemSpider: 171579
- CompTox Dashboard (EPA): DTXSID70194864

Chemical and physical data
- Formula: C_{22}H_{24}F_{4}N_{2}O_{2}
- Molar mass: 424.440 g·mol^{−1}
- 3D model (JSmol): Interactive image
- SMILES: C1CN(CCC1(C2=CC(=CC=C2)C(F)(F)F)O)CCCC(=O)C3=C(C=C(C=C3)F)N
- InChI: InChI=1S/C22H24F4N2O2/c23-17-6-7-18(19(27)14-17)20(29)5-2-10-28-11-8-21(30,9-12-28)15-3-1-4-16(13-15)22(24,25)26/h1,3-4,6-7,13-14,30H,2,5,8-12,27H2; Key:SBAFWLYMAPHVMW-UHFFFAOYSA-N

ID-4708 is a butyrophenone neuroleptic agent. It has the same structure as for trifluperidol but differs by the incorporation of an aniline amino group into the butyrophenone sidechain.

Whereas trifluperidol is a Belgian drug developed at Janssen Pharmaceuticals, ID-4708 was developed by a Japanese company called Sumitomo Chemical in the 1970’s.

ID-4708 when given at low doses reduced ambulation, while at higher doses defecation was inhibited.

== Synthesis ==
The chemical synthesis of ID-4708 was reported:

ID-4708 synthesis

- 2-Acetylbutyrolactone [517-23-7] (1)
- 4-Fluoro-2-nitrobenzoic acid [394-01-4] (2)
- 4-Fluoro-2-nitrobenzoyl chloride [57750-82-0] (3)
- 3-(4-Fluoro-2-nitrobenzoyl)oxolan-2-one [62513-47-7] (4)
- 4-Bromo-1-(4-fluoro-2-nitrophenyl)butan-1-one [62513-48-8] (5)
- 2-(3-Bromopropyl)-2-(4-fluoro-2-nitrophenyl)-1,3-dioxolane [62513-50-2] (6)
- 4-hydroxy-4-(3-trifluoromethylphenyl)piperidine [2249-28-7] (7)
- PC86735492 (8)
- PC70620175 (9)
