= Phenylphenol =

Phenylphenol may refer to:

- 2-Phenylphenol
  - Sodium 2-phenylphenol
- 4-Phenylphenol
