= Roluperidone =

Chemical compound

Clinical data
- Other names: MIN-101; CYR-101; MT-210
- Routes of administration: Oral
- Drug class: Serotonin 5-HT_{2A} receptor antagonist; Sigma σ_{2} receptor antagonist

Identifiers
- IUPAC name: 2-[[1-[2-(4-Fluorophenyl)-2-oxoethyl]piperidin-4-yl]methyl]-3''H''-isoindol-1-one
- CAS Number: 359625-79-9
- PubChem CID: 9799284
- DrugBank: DB13080
- ChemSpider: 7975049
- UNII: 4P31I0M3BF
- KEGG: D11258
- CompTox Dashboard (EPA): DTXSID10189512

Chemical and physical data
- Formula: C_{22}H_{23}FN_{2}O_{2}
- Molar mass: 366.436 g·mol^{−1}
- 3D model (JSmol): Interactive image
- SMILES: C1CN(CCC1CN2CC3=CC=CC=C3C2=O)CC(=O)C4=CC=C(C=C4)F
- InChI: InChI=1S/C22H23FN2O2/c23-19-7-5-17(6-8-19)21(26)15-24-11-9-16(10-12-24)13-25-14-18-3-1-2-4-20(18)22(25)27/h1-8,16H,9-15H2; Key:RNRYULFRLCBRQS-UHFFFAOYSA-N

Roluperidone (former developmental code names MIN-101, CYR-101, MT-210) is a 5-HT_{2A} and σ_{2} receptor antagonist under development by Minerva Neurosciences for the treatment of schizophrenia. One of its metabolites also has some affinity for the H_{1} receptor. Pre-clinical findings provide evidence of the effect of roluperidone on brain-derived neurotrophic factor ("BDNF"), which has been associated with neurogenesis, neuroplasticity, neuroprotection, synapse regulation, learning and memory.

As of May 2018, the drug was in phase III clinical trials. In May 2020, the shares of Minerva Neurosciences plummeted 67% after the trial "failed to meet its primary endpoint of reduction in negative symptoms, and key secondary endpoints of improvement in personal and social performance measurements." However, in August 2022 Minerva submitted a New Drug Application (NDA) to the Food and Drug Administration (FDA) for the approval of roluperidone for the treatment of schizophrenia. The NDA submission in 2022 followed successful completion of a phase III clinical trial which was published in early 2022. Minerva believed that the findings of this second trial supported the claim that the drug was an effective agent for the treatment of negative symptoms in schizophrenia. However, in October 2022, FDA sent Minerva a refusal to file letter pertaining to the New Drug Application for roluperidone for treating negative symptoms in schizophrenia patients.

== Chemistry ==
=== Synthesis ===
Patents: Precursor:

The Boc protection of 4-aminomethylpiperidine [7144-05-0] (1) gives tert-Butyl 4-aminomethylpiperidine-1-carboxylate hydrochloride [359629-16-6] (2). The free-radical halogenation of ethyl o-toluate [87-24-1] (3) led to ethyl 2-(bromomethyl)benzoate [7115-91-5] (4). The reaction between the two intermediates led to 2-[(1-tert-Butoxycarbonylpiperidin-4-yl)methyl]isoindolin-1-one [359629-19-9] (5). Deprotection yielded 2-(Piperidin-4-ylmethyl)-3H-isoindol-1-one;hydrochloride (6). Alkylation of the secondary nitrogen with 2-chloro-4'-fluoroacetophenone [700-35-6] (7) completed the synthesis of Roluperidone (8).

== See also ==
- Serotonin 5-HT_{2A} receptor antagonist
- List of investigational antipsychotics
- Risperidone
- Paliperidone
- Iloperidone
- Glemanserin
- Pruvanserin
- Volinanserin
- Lenperone
- Lidanserin
- MIN-117
- MIN-202
