= C12H10O =

The molecular formula C_{12}H_{10}O (molar mass: 170.21 g/mol, exact mass: 170.0732 u) may refer to:

- Diphenyl ether
- 2-Phenylphenol, or o-phenylphenol
- 3-Phenylphenol, or m-phenylphenol
- 4-Phenylphenol, or p-phenylphenol
