= Altanserin =

Chemical compound

Clinical data
- Drug class: Serotonin 5-HT_{2A} receptor antagonist
- ATC code: None

Identifiers
- IUPAC name: 3-[2-[4-(4-fluorobenzoyl)piperidin-1-yl]ethyl]-2-sulfanylidene-1H-quinazolin-4-one
- CAS Number: 76330-71-7
- PubChem CID: 3033677
- ChemSpider: 2298299
- UNII: 5015H744JQ
- ChEMBL: ChEMBL62919
- CompTox Dashboard (EPA): DTXSID5043891
- ECHA InfoCard: 100.071.272

Chemical and physical data
- Formula: C_{22}H_{22}FN_{3}O_{2}S
- Molar mass: 411.50 g·mol^{−1}
- 3D model (JSmol): Interactive image
- SMILES: Fc1ccc(cc1)C(=O)C4CCN(CCN3C(=O)c2ccccc2NC3=S)CC4
- InChI: InChI=1S/C22H22FN3O2S/c23-17-7-5-15(6-8-17)20(27)16-9-11-25(12-10-16)13-14-26-21(28)18-3-1-2-4-19(18)24-22(26)29/h1-8,16H,9-14H2,(H,24,29); Key:SMYALUSCZJXWHG-UHFFFAOYSA-N

Altanserin is a compound that binds to the 5-HT_{2A} receptor (5-Hydroxytryptamine (serotonin) 2A receptor). Labeled with the isotope fluorine-18 it is used as a radioligand in positron emission tomography (PET) studies of the brain, i.e., studies of the 5-HT_{2A} neuroreceptors. Besides human neuroimaging studies altanserin has also been used in the study of rats.

An alternative for PET imaging the 5-HT_{2A} receptor is the [^{11}C]volinanserin (MDL-100,907) radioligand. ^{18}F-altanserin and ^{3}H-volinanserin have shown very comparable binding. Both altanserin and MDL 100,907 are 5-HT_{2A} receptor antagonists. [^{18}F]-setoperone can also be used in PET.

An alternative SPECT radioligand is the [^{123}I]-5-I-R91150 receptor antagonist.

A rapid chemical synthesis of fluorine-18 and H-2 dual-labeled altanserin has been described.

Other ligands for other parts of the serotonin system used in PET studies are, e.g., DASB, ketanserin, and WAY-100635.

== Pharmacology ==
=== Pharmacodynamics ===
Altanserin shows high affinity for the serotonin 5-HT_{2A} receptor (K_{i} = 0.13–0.3 nM). It also shows 20-fold lower affinity for the serotonin 5-HT_{2C} receptor (K_{i} = 6 nM). The drug has lower or negligible affinity for the serotonin 5-HT_{1A} receptor (K_{i} = 1,570 nM), serotonin 5-HT_{1B} receptor (K_{i} = >10,000 nM), serotonin 5-HT_{6} receptor (K_{i} = 1,756 nM), serotonin 5-HT_{7} receptor (K_{i} = 15 nM), dopamine D_{2} receptor (K_{i} = 62 nM), α_{1}-adrenergic receptor (K_{i} = 455 nM), and histamine H_{1} receptor (K_{i} = 20 nM).

== Human brain mapping studies with altanserin ==
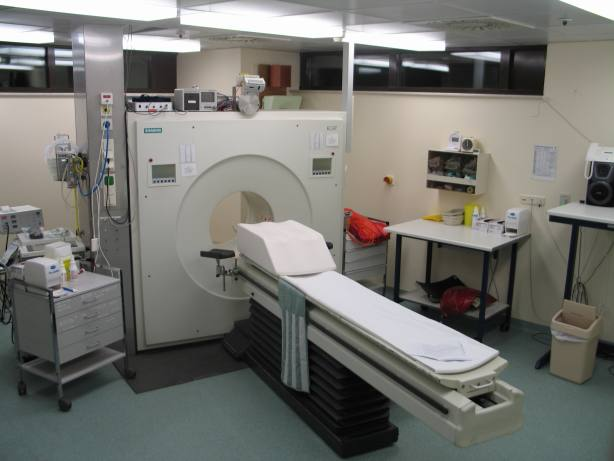
A PET scanner. Human experiments with fluorine-18 altanserin are performed in these types of brain scanners.

As of 2007 altanserin is probably not used in clinical routine. However, there have been performed several research-based neuroimaging studies with the compound in humans since the 1990s. Some of these studies have considered methodogical issues such as the reproducibility of the method or whether to use constant infusion or bolus-infusion delivery of altanserin. Other studies have compared altanserin binding to subject variables such as age, personality trait and neuropsychiatric disorder.

The altanserin PET scan shows high binding in neocortex. The cerebellum is often regarded as a region with no specific 5-HT_{2A} binding and the brain region is used as a reference in some studies, even though an autoradiography study has found nonnegligible levels of 5-HT_{2A} binding in the human cerebellum, and another type of study have observed strong immunoreaction against 5-HT_{2A} receptor protein in rat Purkinje cells.

In the table below is an overview of the results of altanserin binding seen in human PET-studies. A consistent finding across altanserin studies has been that the binding decreases with age. This is in line with in vitro studies of the 5-HT_{2A} receptor, as well as PET studies with other radioligands that binds to the receptor.

The result for recovered bulimia-type anorexia nervosa is in line with a SPECT study of anorexia nervosa patients, that found a decrease in frontal, occipital and parietal cortices. The results of PET studies of the 5-HT_{2A} in depression has been mixed.

Altanserin binding has also been examine in twins, where one study showed higher correlation between monozygotic twin pairs than between dizygotic twin pairs, giving evidence that the binding is "strongly genetically determined".

Altanserin neuroimaging studies
What	Result	Reference
Gender	Higher binding in men	
Body mass index	Correlation in cortex	
Neuroticism (NEO PI-R)	Increase in frontolimbic region	
Tourette syndrome	Increase	
Obsessive-compulsive disorder	Increase in caudate nuclei	
(Recovered) bulimia-type anorexia nervosa	Decrease in left subgenual cingulate, left parietal cortex and right occipital cortex	
Unipolar depression	Decrease in a region in right hemisphere (posterolateral orbitofrontal cortex and the anterior insular cortex)	
Major depressive disorder	Decrease in hippocampus	
Older depressed patients	Decrease in hippocampus	
Borderline personality disorder	Increase in hippocampus	
Schizophrenia	No significant cortical difference, higher binding in caudate	
At-risk mental state	Decrease	See also
Age	Decrease	
Age	Decrease	
Age	Decrease in cortical regions (except occipital), increase in cerebellum	
Mild cognitive impairment	Decrease	
Alzheimer's disease	Decrease in amygdalo-hippocampal complex and cortical regions, such as anterior cingulate, lateral temporal cortex, prefrontal cortex and sensorimotor cortex	

== Synthesis ==
Patent: Radiolabelled:

The reaction of 4-(4-fluorobenzoyl)piperidine [56346-57-7] (1) with 2-bromoethylamine [107-09-5] gives [1-(2-aminoethyl)piperidin-4-yl]-(4-fluorophenyl)methanone [83763-22-8] (2). The reaction of the terminal amino group with thiophosgene [463-71-8] leads to the corresponding isothiocyanate derivative, 4-fluorophenyl 1-(2-isothiocyanatoethyl)piperidin-4-yl ketone [84946-22-5] (3). Upon reaction of this reactive intermediate with ethyl anthranilate [87-25-2] (4), the transient addition product might be expected to be initially formed (5'). An intramolecular lactamization to the heterocyclic ring then occurs giving altanserin (6).

== See also ==
- Serotonin 5-HT_{2A} receptor antagonist
- Ketanserin
- Pirenperone
- Setoperone
