= Coffee furanone =

Names
- Preferred IUPAC name 2-Methyloxolan-3-one
- Other names 2-Methyltetrahydrofuran-3-one; 2-Methyl-3-oxotetrahydrofuran; 2-Methyltetrahydro-3-furanone; Dihydro-2-methyl-3-furanone; 2-Methyldihydrofuran-3(2H)-one

Identifiers
| CAS Number | 3188-00-9 |
| 3D model (JSmol) | Interactive image |
| ChemSpider | 17494 |
| ECHA InfoCard | 100.019.715 |
| PubChem CID | 18522 |
| UNII | I3703CL967 |
| CompTox Dashboard (EPA) | DTXSID9047677 |
- InChI: InChI=1S/C5H8O2/c1-4-5(6)2-3-7-4/h4H,2-3H2,1H3 Key: FCWYQRVIQDNGBI-UHFFFAOYSA-N; InChI=1/C5H8O2/c1-4-5(6)2-3-7-4/h4H,2-3H2,1H3 Key: FCWYQRVIQDNGBI-UHFFFAOYAD
- SMILES: O=C1C(OCC1)C

Properties
| Chemical formula | C_{5}H_{8}O_{2} |
| Molar mass | 100.117 g·mol^{−1} |
| Density | 1.040 g/cm^{3} (20 °C) |
| Boiling point | 139 °C (282 °F; 412 K) |
- Except where otherwise noted, data are given for materials in their standard state (at 25 °C [77 °F], 100 kPa). Infobox references

Coffee furanone (2-methyltetrahydrofuran-3-one) is a pleasant smelling liquid furan derivative which is a volatile constituent of the aroma complex of roasted coffee. Coffee furanone is less odorous than furfuryl mercaptan, which with an odor threshold of 0.005 ppb was the first high impact aroma chemical, but has a very pleasant sweet caramel character, with some nuttiness.

== Synthesis ==
Coffee furanone was synthesized in 1963 by Wynberg via acid-catalyzed ring closure of β-alkoxy diazoketones. Coffee furanone has also been prepared via the condensation of ethyl lactate and methyl acrylate in DMSO solution and (under phase transfer conditions) in ionic liquids. A related lactic acid synthesis was described as having the advantages of a simple process, high conversion rate, low pollution, and low cost. This compound has also been prepared in acceptable yield via oxidative hydroxylation of the 2-acetylbutyrolactone. Further approaches to the synthesis of coffee furanone involved the hydrolysis of the corresponding dithioketals and the oxidation of 2-methyltetrahydrofuran employing lithium hypochlorite in the presence of ruthenium catalysts.

== Applications ==
The synthetic version of this natural flavorant and odorant is used in a variety of food and beverage applications, including coffee, nuts, cocoa, brandy, meat sauces and as a general food flavorant at a typical dosage (about 5-20 ppm), similar to the natural concentration (30 ppm) of coffee furanone in roasted coffee.
