= Volinanserin =

Chemical compound

Clinical data
- Other names: Volanserin; MDL-100,907; MDL-100907; MDL100907; M100907; M-100907; M-100,907
- Routes of administration: Oral
- Drug class: Serotonin 5-HT_{2A} receptor antagonist
- ATC code: None

Pharmacokinetic data
- Onset of action: T_{max}: 1–2.5 hours
- Elimination half-life: 6.6 hours (range 4.5–9.8 hours)

Identifiers
- IUPAC name: (R)-(2,3-dimethoxyphenyl)-[1-[2-(4-fluorophenyl)ethyl]-4-piperidyl]methanol
- CAS Number: 139290-65-6
- PubChem CID: 5311271
- IUPHAR/BPS: 185
- ChemSpider: 4470782
- UNII: EW71EE171J
- ChEMBL: ChEMBL74355
- CompTox Dashboard (EPA): DTXSID6047363
- ECHA InfoCard: 100.123.797

Chemical and physical data
- Formula: C_{22}H_{28}FNO_{3}
- Molar mass: 373.468 g·mol^{−1}
- 3D model (JSmol): Interactive image
- SMILES: COC1=CC=CC(=C1OC)[C@@H](C2CCN(CC2)CCC3=CC=C(C=C3)F)O
- InChI: InChI=1S/C22H28FNO3/c1-26-20-5-3-4-19(22(20)27-2)21(25)17-11-14-24(15-12-17)13-10-16-6-8-18(23)9-7-16/h3-9,17,21,25H,10-15H2,1-2H3/t21-/m1/s1; Key:HXTGXYRHXAGCFP-OAQYLSRUSA-N

Volinanserin (INN; developmental code MDL-100,907) is a highly selective 5-HT_{2A} receptor antagonist that is frequently used in scientific research to investigate the function of the 5-HT_{2A} receptor. It was also tested in clinical trials as a potential antipsychotic, antidepressant, and treatment for insomnia but was never marketed. The drug reached phase 3 trials for schizophrenia and insomnia prior to the discontinuation of its development in the late 2000s. It is taken orally.

== Pharmacology ==
=== Pharmacokinetics ===
The time to peak levels of volinanserin is 1 to 2.5 hours. The elimination half-life of volinanserin is 6.6 hours, with a range of 4.5 to 9.8 hours. However, cortical serotonin 5-HT_{2A} receptor occupancy with volinanserin measured by positron emission tomography (PET) imaging lasts much longer than its circulating elimination half-life would imply.

== Chemistry ==
=== Synthesis ===
The synthesis of volinanserin has been reported. Beginning with protection of ethyl isonipecotate (1) with Boc anhydride gives ethyl N-Boc-4-piperidinecarboxylate (2). Ester-amide interchange with N-methoxymethylamine HCl in the presence of carbonyldiimidazole (CDI) coupling agent gives 1-Boc-4-[methoxy(methyl)carbamoyl]piperidine (3). Weinreb ketone synthesis occurs upon benzoylation with 1,2-dimethoxybenzene (4) to give 1-Boc-4-(2,3-dimethoxybenzoyl)piperidine (5). Acid removal of the urethane protecting group gives (2,3-dimethoxyphenyl)-piperidin-4-ylmethanone (6). The reduction of the ketone with sodium borohydride leads to (2,3-dimethoxyphenyl)-piperidin-4-ylmethanol (7). Resolution of the alcohol gives (8). S_{N}2 alkylation of the secondary nitrogen with 4-fluorophenethyl bromide (9) completes the synthesis of volinanserin (10).

Synthesis of volinanserin

== See also ==
- Serotonin 5-HT_{2A} receptor antagonist
- List of investigational antipsychotics
- List of investigational insomnia drugs
- Eplivanserin/volinanserin
- Glemanserin
- Pruvanserin
- Roluperidone
- Lenperone
- Lidanserin
- Ketanserin
- Ritanserin
- Eplivanserin
- Pimavanserin
- 4F-4PP
