= Oxiperomide =

Chemical compound

Clinical data
- Routes of administration: Oral

Identifiers
- IUPAC name: 3-[1-(2-phenoxyethyl)piperidin-4-yl]-1H-benzimidazol-2-one
- CAS Number: 5322-53-2
- PubChem CID: 68634
- ChemSpider: 61893
- UNII: WRO75M6RW2
- KEGG: D02676
- ChEMBL: ChEMBL2059304
- CompTox Dashboard (EPA): DTXSID30201306

Chemical and physical data
- Formula: C_{20}H_{23}N_{3}O_{2}
- Molar mass: 337.423 g·mol^{−1}
- 3D model (JSmol): Interactive image
- SMILES: C1CN(CCC1N2C3=CC=CC=C3NC2=O)CCOC4=CC=CC=C4
- InChI: InChI=1S/C20H23N3O2/c24-20-21-18-8-4-5-9-19(18)23(20)16-10-12-22(13-11-16)14-15-25-17-6-2-1-3-7-17/h1-9,16H,10-15H2,(H,21,24); Key:NVDBBGBUTKLRSN-UHFFFAOYSA-N

Oxiperomide is an antipsychotic. Clinical trials demonstrated that it can reduce dyskinesia in patients with Parkinson's disease who are taking dopamine agonists without increasing Parkinsonian symptoms. It does this by selectively antagonizing dopamine receptors. Further development of this drug is not available. It appears to have never been marketed.

== See also ==
- Benperidol
- Neflumozide
