= Zonisamide =

Chemical compound

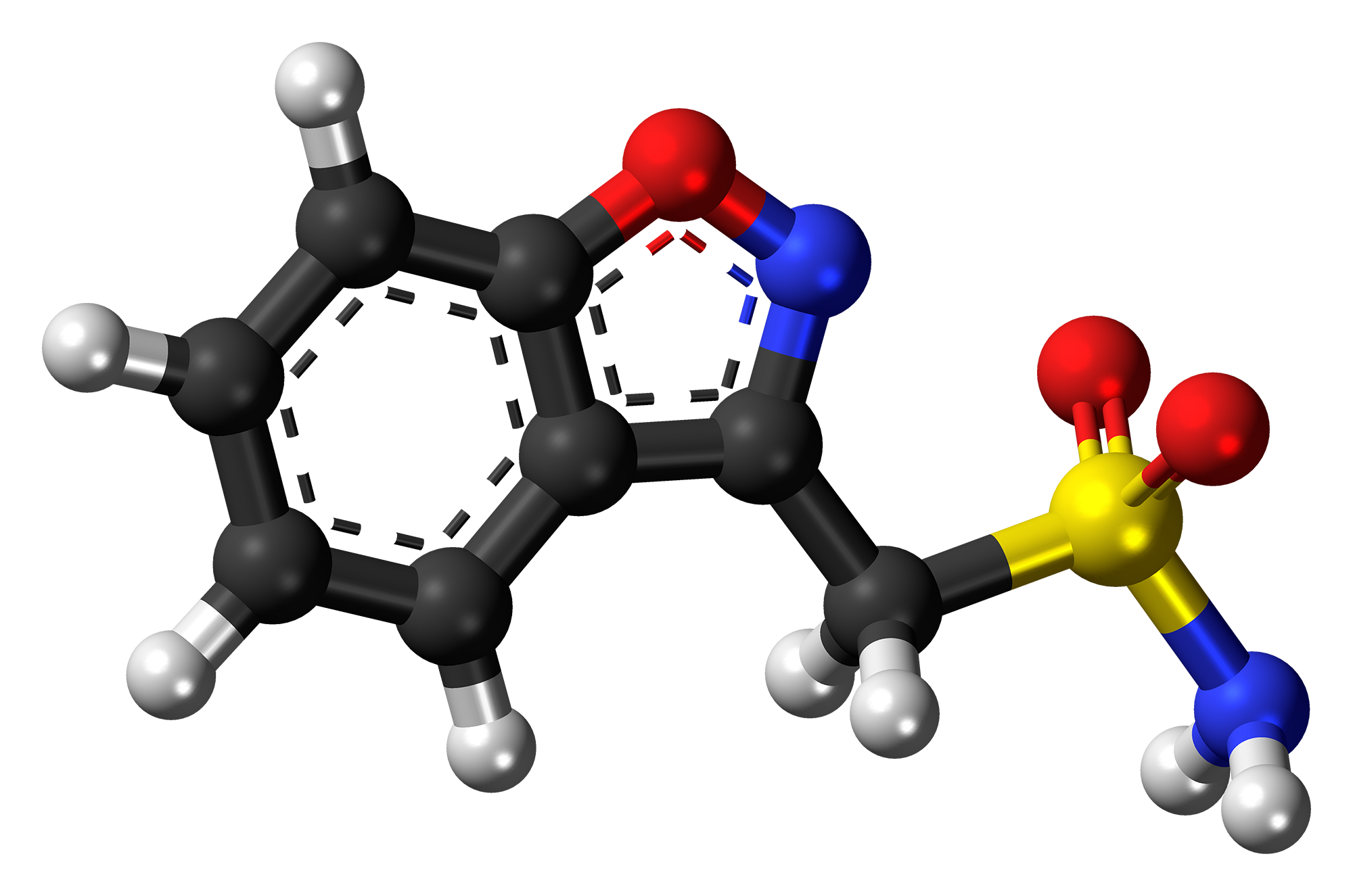

Clinical data
- Trade names: Zonegran, Zonisade
- AHFS/Drugs.com: Monograph
- MedlinePlus: a603008
- License data: US DailyMed: Zonisamide
- Pregnancy category: AU: D
- Routes of administration: By mouth
- ATC code: N03AX15 (WHO)

Legal status
- Legal status: AU: S4 (Prescription only); UK: POM (Prescription only); US: ℞-only; EU: Rx-only

Pharmacokinetic data
- Bioavailability: ~100%
- Protein binding: 40%
- Metabolism: Liver through CYP3A4
- Elimination half-life: 63 hours in plasma
- Excretion: Kidney (62%); Faeces (3%)

Identifiers
- IUPAC name: benzo[d]isoxazol-3-ylmethanesulfonamide
- CAS Number: 68291-97-4
- PubChem CID: 5734
- IUPHAR/BPS: 7047
- DrugBank: DB00909
- ChemSpider: 5532
- UNII: 459384H98V
- KEGG: D00538
- ChEBI: CHEBI:10127
- ChEMBL: ChEMBL750
- PDB ligand: ZON (PDBe, RCSB PDB)
- CompTox Dashboard (EPA): DTXSID9046023
- ECHA InfoCard: 100.118.526

Chemical and physical data
- Formula: C_{8}H_{8}N_{2}O_{3}S
- Molar mass: 212.22 g·mol^{−1}
- 3D model (JSmol): Interactive image
- Melting point: 162 °C (324 °F)
- SMILES: O=S(=O)(N)Cc2noc1ccccc12
- InChI: InChI=1S/C8H8N2O3S/c9-14(11,12)5-7-6-3-1-2-4-8(6)13-10-7/h1-4H,5H2,(H2,9,11,12); Key:UBQNRHZMVUUOMG-UHFFFAOYSA-N

Zonisamide, sold under the brand name Zonegran among others, is a medication used to treat the symptoms of epilepsy and Parkinson's disease. Chemically it is a sulfonamide. It is most commonly used as an anti-seizure medication in patients with focal or generalized epilepsy.

In 2020, it was the 276th most commonly prescribed medication in the United States, with more than 1 million prescriptions.

== Medical uses ==
=== Epilepsy ===
Zonisamide is approved in the United States, United Kingdom, Europe, Australia, Japan, South Korea and other countries as a treatment of focal epilepsy. In the United States it is approved as an adjunctive therapy for patients with focal epilepsy aged 16 and older. However, in Europe, Japan, Australia and South Korea it is also approved for use as monotherapy in focal epilepsy. There is also evidence that zonisamide is effective for the treatment generalized epilepsy (including absence, generalized tonic-clonic, myoclonic and other seizures types) in pediatric and adult patients. Zonisamide has also been found to be safe and effective for patients with Lennox-Gastaut syndrome.

=== Parkinson's disease ===
It has been approved for the treatment of the motor symptoms of Parkinson's disease (PD), as an adjunct to levodopa, in a few countries such as Japan. In Japan, zonisamide has been used as an adjunct to levodopa treatment since 2009. In addition, there is clinical evidence that zonisamide in combination with levodopa control of motor symptoms of PD but evidence for the treatment of the non motor symptoms of PD lacking.

=== Migraine ===
Zonisamide is sometimes used off label as a treatment for migraine headaches. Several small studies have suggested that it is effective and may work similarly to topiramate.

== Adverse effects ==
Adverse effects by incidence:

Very common (>10% incidence) adverse effects include:

- Anorexia
- Somnolence
- Dizziness
- Agitation
- Irritability
- Confusional state
- Depression
- Diplopia
- Memory impairment
- Hypobicarbonatemia (decreased bicarbonate)

Common (1–10% incidence) adverse effects include:

- Ecchymosis (easy bruising)
- Hypersensitivity
- Affect lability
- Anxiety
- Insomnia
- Psychotic disorder
- Bradyphrenia (brain fog)
- Disturbance in attention
- Nystagmus (involuntary eye movements)
- Paraesthesia (abnormal sensations)
- Speech disorder
- Tremor
- Abdominal pain
- Constipation
- Diarrhoea
- Dyspepsia
- Nausea
- Rash
- Pruritus (excessive itching)
- Alopecia (hair loss)
- Nephrolithiasis
- Fatigue
- Influenza-like illness
- Pyrexia (fever; elevated body temperature)
- Peripheral oedema
- Weight loss

Incidence unknown

- Reproductive toxic effects

=== Interactions ===
Zonisamide and other carbonic anhydrase inhibitors such as topiramate, furosemide, and hydrochlorothiazide have been known to interfere with amobarbital, which has led to inadequate anesthetization during the Wada test. Zonisamide may also interact with other carbonic anhydrase inhibitors to increase the potential for metabolic acidosis.

Additionally, the metabolism of zonisamide is inhibited by ketoconazole, ciclosporin, miconazole, fluconazole and carbamazepine (in descending order of inhibition) due to their effects on the CYP3A4 enzyme.

Zonisamide is not known to inhibit cytochrome P450 enzymes when present at therapeutic concentrations.

== Mechanism of action ==
Zonisamide is an antiseizure drug chemically classified as a sulfonamide and unrelated to other antiseizure agents. The precise mechanism by which zonisamide exerts its antiseizure effect is unknown, although it is believed that the drug blocks sodium and T-type calcium channels, which leads to the suppression of neuronal hypersynchronization (that is, seizure-form activity). It is also known to be a weak carbonic anhydrase inhibitor (similarly to the anticonvulsant topiramate). In addition, zonisamide modulates GABAergic and glutamatergic neurotransmission. More recently, it has also been demonstrated to positively modulate cerebral glycine receptors.

== Pharmacokinetics ==
=== Absorption ===
Zonisamide has a variable, yet relatively rapid rate of absorption with a time to peak concentration of 2.8–3.9 hours. Bioavailability is close to 100% and food has no effect on the bioavailability of zonisamide, but may affect the rate of absorption.

=== Metabolism ===
Zonisamide is metabolized mostly by the CYP3A4 isoenzyme, but also CYP3A7 and CYP3A5, to 2-(sulphamoylacetyl)-phenol via reductive cleavage of the 1,2-benzisoxazole ring.

== History ==
Zonisamide was discovered by Uno and colleagues in 1972 and launched by Dainippon Sumitomo Pharma (formerly Dainippon Pharmaceutical) in 1989 as Excegran It was marketed by Élan in the United States starting in 2000 as Zonegran, before Élan transferred their interests in zonisamide to Eisai Co., Ltd. in 2004. Eisai also markets Zonegran in Asia (China, Taiwan, and fourteen others) and Europe (starting in Germany and the United Kingdom). It is available in the United States in capsules and an oral liquid preparation. In Europe and Japan it is also available as an orally dispersible tablet.

== Research ==
=== Tardive dyskinesia ===
In an open-label trial zonisamide attenuated the symptoms of tardive dyskinesia.

=== Obesity ===
It has also been studied for obesity with significant positive effects on body weight loss and there are three ongoing clinical trials for this indication.

It was a component of the never-marketed obesity treatment Empatic.

=== Bipolar depression ===
It has also been used off-label by psychiatrists as a mood stabilizer to treat bipolar depression.
