= Bupropion/zonisamide =

Combination drug

Combination of
- Bupropion: Norepinephrine-dopamine reuptake inhibitor and nicotinic acetylcholine receptor antagonist
- Zonisamide: Sulfonamide anticonvulsant

Legal status
- Legal status: Investigational

Identifiers
- CAS Number: 944389-00-8

Bupropion/zonisamide (former tentative brand name Empatic, Excalia) is an experimental combination of bupropion which was under development for the treatment of obesity. Bupropion is a norepinephrine–dopamine reuptake inhibitor and nicotinic acetylcholine receptor antagonist, while zonisamide is an anticonvulsant acting as a sodium channel blocker, T-type calcium channel blocker, and weak carbonic anhydrase inhibitor. The combination was being developed by Orexigen Therapeutics and reached phase II clinical trials prior to discontinuation.

== See also ==
- Naltrexone/bupropion
