= Timiperone =

Typical antipsychotic medication

Clinical data
- Trade names: Tolopelon
- AHFS/Drugs.com: International Drug Names
- Routes of administration: By mouth
- ATC code: none

Legal status
- Legal status: In general: ℞ (Prescription only)

Identifiers
- IUPAC name: 1-(4-fluorophenyl)-4-[4-(2-sulfanylidene-3H-benzimidazol-1-yl)piperidin-1-yl]butan-1-one
- CAS Number: 57648-21-2
- PubChem CID: 3033151
- ChemSpider: 2297930
- UNII: 626DQ7N19L
- KEGG: D02035
- ChEMBL: ChEMBL2107117
- CompTox Dashboard (EPA): DTXSID9023673
- ECHA InfoCard: 100.055.328

Chemical and physical data
- Formula: C_{22}H_{24}FN_{3}OS
- Molar mass: 397.51 g·mol^{−1}
- 3D model (JSmol): Interactive image
- SMILES: C1CN(CCC1N2C3=CC=CC=C3NC2=S)CCCC(=O)C4=CC=C(C=C4)F
- InChI: InChI=1S/C22H24FN3OS/c23-17-9-7-16(8-10-17)21(27)6-3-13-25-14-11-18(12-15-25)26-20-5-2-1-4-19(20)24-22(26)28/h1-2,4-5,7-10,18H,3,6,11-15H2,(H,24,28); Key:YDLQKLWVKKFPII-UHFFFAOYSA-N

Timiperone, sold under the brand name Tolopelon, is a typical antipsychotic of the butyrophenone class which is marketed in Japan for the treatment of schizophrenia. It is similar in chemical structure to benperidol, but has a thiourea group instead of a urea group. It acts as an antagonist for the D_{2} and 5-HT_{2A} receptors.
