= 5-I-R91150 =

Chemical compound

Identifiers
- IUPAC name: 4-amino-N-[1-[3-(4-fluorophenoxy)propyl]-4-methyl-4-piperidinyl]-5-iodo-2-methoxybenzamide
- CAS Number: 155928-24-8
- PubChem CID: 132997
- ChemSpider: 117371
- UNII: T0W602CN0W
- CompTox Dashboard (EPA): DTXSID90165995

Chemical and physical data
- Formula: C_{23}H_{29}FIN_{3}O_{2}
- Molar mass: 525.407 g·mol^{−1}
- 3D model (JSmol): Interactive image
- SMILES: Ic1cc(c(OC)cc1N)C(=O)NC3(CCN(CCCc2ccc(F)cc2)CC3)C
- InChI: InChI=1S/C23H29FIN3O2/c1-23(27-22(29)18-14-19(25)20(26)15-21(18)30-2)9-12-28(13-10-23)11-3-4-16-5-7-17(24)8-6-16/h5-8,14-15H,3-4,9-13,26H2,1-2H3,(H,27,29); Key:MIPHZURHMMOGLS-UHFFFAOYSA-N

5-I-R91150 (or R93274) is a compound that acts as a potent and selective antagonist of 5-HT_{2A} receptors. Its main application is as its iodine-123 radiolabeled form, in which it can be used in SPECT scanning in human neuroimaging studies, to examine the distribution of the 5-HT_{2A} receptor subtype in the brain, e.g. with respect to sex and age and in adults with Asperger syndrome or Alzheimer's disease.

An alternative 5-HT_{2A} receptor ligand also used in neuroimaging is altanserin.
