= Glemanserin =

Chemical compound

Clinical data
- Other names: MDL-11,939; MDL-11939; MDL11939
- Routes of administration: Oral
- Drug class: Serotonin 5-HT_{2A} receptor antagonist
- ATC code: None

Identifiers
- IUPAC name: α-phenyl-1-(2-phenylethyl)-4-piperidine methanol
- CAS Number: 132553-86-7
- PubChem CID: 71781
- ChemSpider: 64815
- UNII: X96LS7MC5Z
- CompTox Dashboard (EPA): DTXSID4042624

Chemical and physical data
- Formula: C_{20}H_{25}NO
- Molar mass: 295.426 g·mol^{−1}
- 3D model (JSmol): Interactive image
- SMILES: OC(c1ccccc1)C3CCN(CCc2ccccc2)CC3
- InChI: InChI=1S/C20H25NO/c22-20(18-9-5-2-6-10-18)19-12-15-21(16-13-19)14-11-17-7-3-1-4-8-17/h1-10,19-20,22H,11-16H2; Key:AXNGJCOYCMDPQG-UHFFFAOYSA-N

Glemanserin (INN; developmental code MDL-11,939) is a drug which acts as a potent and selective 5-HT_{2A} receptor antagonist . The first truly selective 5-HT_{2A} ligand to be discovered, glemanserin resulted in the development of the widely used and even more potent and selective 5-HT_{2A} receptor antagonist volinanserin (MDL-100,907), which is a fluorinated analogue. Though it was largely superseded in scientific research by volinanserin, glemanserin was investigated clinically for the treatment of generalized anxiety disorder and reached phase 3 trials for this use. However, it was ultimately found to be ineffective and was not marketed. The drug was also investigated for treatment of cardiac arrhythmias, but was not marketed for this use either.

== See also ==
- Serotonin 5-HT_{2A} receptor antagonist
- Volinanserin
- Pruvanserin
- Roluperidone
- Lenperone
- Lidanserin
- 4F-4PP
