= Benzisoxazole =

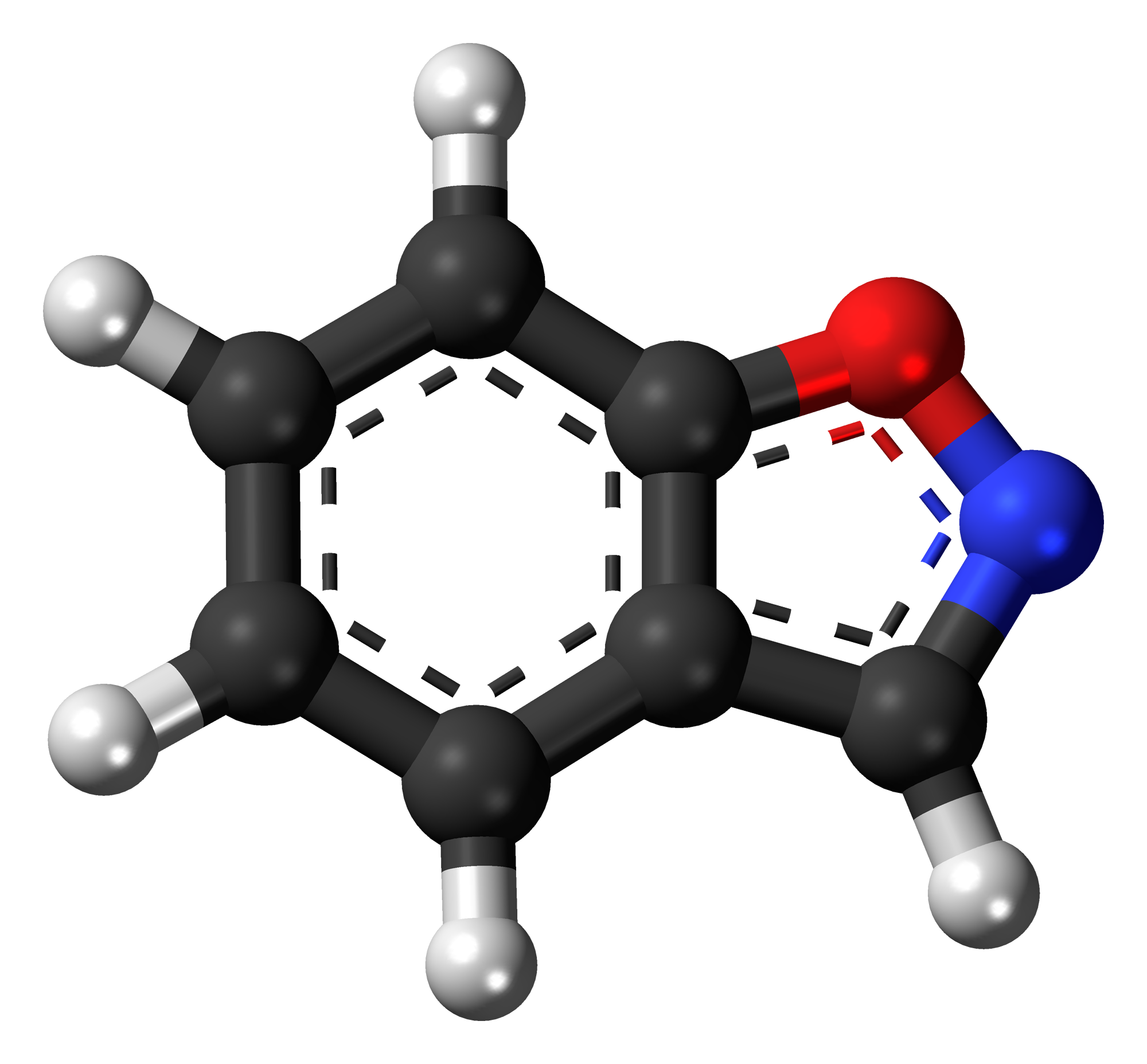

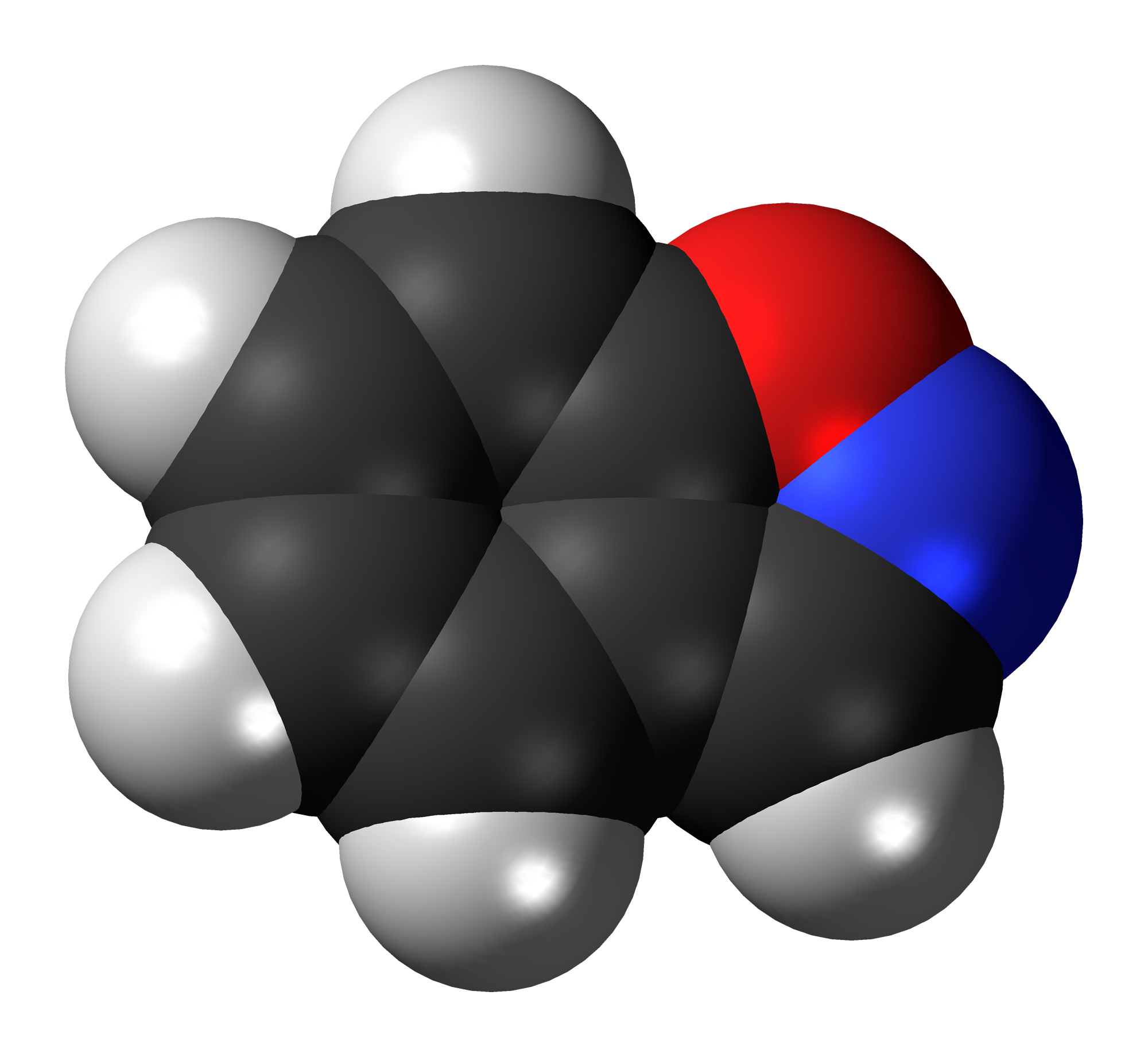

Names
- Preferred IUPAC name 1,2-Benzoxazole
- Other names Benzo[d]isoxazole; Indoxazine

Identifiers
CAS Number	271-95-4
3D model (JSmol)	Interactive image
Beilstein Reference	2154
ChEBI	CHEBI:51554
ChEMBL	ChEMBL314871
ChemSpider	64227
ECHA InfoCard	100.005.440
EC Number	205-983-1
PubChem CID	71073
UNII	D879RKM5NQ
CompTox Dashboard (EPA)	DTXSID20181567
- InChI: InChI=1S/C7H5NO/c1-2-4-7-6(3-1)5-8-9-7/h1-5H Key: KTZQTRPPVKQPFO-UHFFFAOYSA-N; InChI=1/C7H5NO/c1-2-4-7-6(3-1)5-8-9-7/h1-5H Key: KTZQTRPPVKQPFO-UHFFFAOYAI
- SMILES: n2oc1ccccc1c2

Properties
Chemical formula	C_{7}H_{5}NO
Molar mass	119.123 g·mol^{−1}
Appearance	Colorless liquid
Density	1.18 g/cm^{3}
Boiling point	35 to 38 °C (95 to 100 °F; 308 to 311 K) (at 2.67 hPa); 101-102 °C (at 2 kPa)

Hazards
- GHS labelling
Pictograms	(GHS07: Exclamation mark)
Signal word	Warning
Hazard statements	H315, H319, H335
Precautionary statements	P261, P264, P271, P280, P302+P352, P304+P340, P305+P351+P338, P312, P321, P332+P313, P337+P313, P362, P403+P233, P405, P501
Flash point	58 °C (136 °F; 331 K)
- Except where otherwise noted, data are given for materials in their standard state (at 25 °C [77 °F], 100 kPa). verify (what is ?) Infobox references

1,2-Benzisoxazole is an aromatic organic compound with a molecular formula C_{7}H_{5}NO containing a benzene-fused isoxazole ring structure. The compound itself has no common applications; however, functionalized benzisoxazoles and benzisoxazoyls have a variety of uses, including pharmaceutical drugs such as some antipsychotics (including risperidone, paliperidone, ocaperidone, and iloperidone) and the anticonvulsant zonisamide.

Its aromaticity makes it relatively stable; however, it is only weakly basic.

== Synthesis ==
Benzisoxazole may be prepared from inexpensive salicylaldehyde, via a base catalyzed room temperature reaction with hydroxylamine-O-sulfonic acid.

Synthesis of 1,2-Benzisoxazol aus Salicylaldehyd und HOSA

== Reactions ==
=== Kemp elimination ===
First reported by Daniel S. Kemp, the relatively weak N-O bond can be cleaved by a strong base to yield a 2-hydroxybenzonitrile species.

== See also ==
Structural isomers

- Benzoxazole
- Anthranil
