= Pruvanserin =

Chemical compound

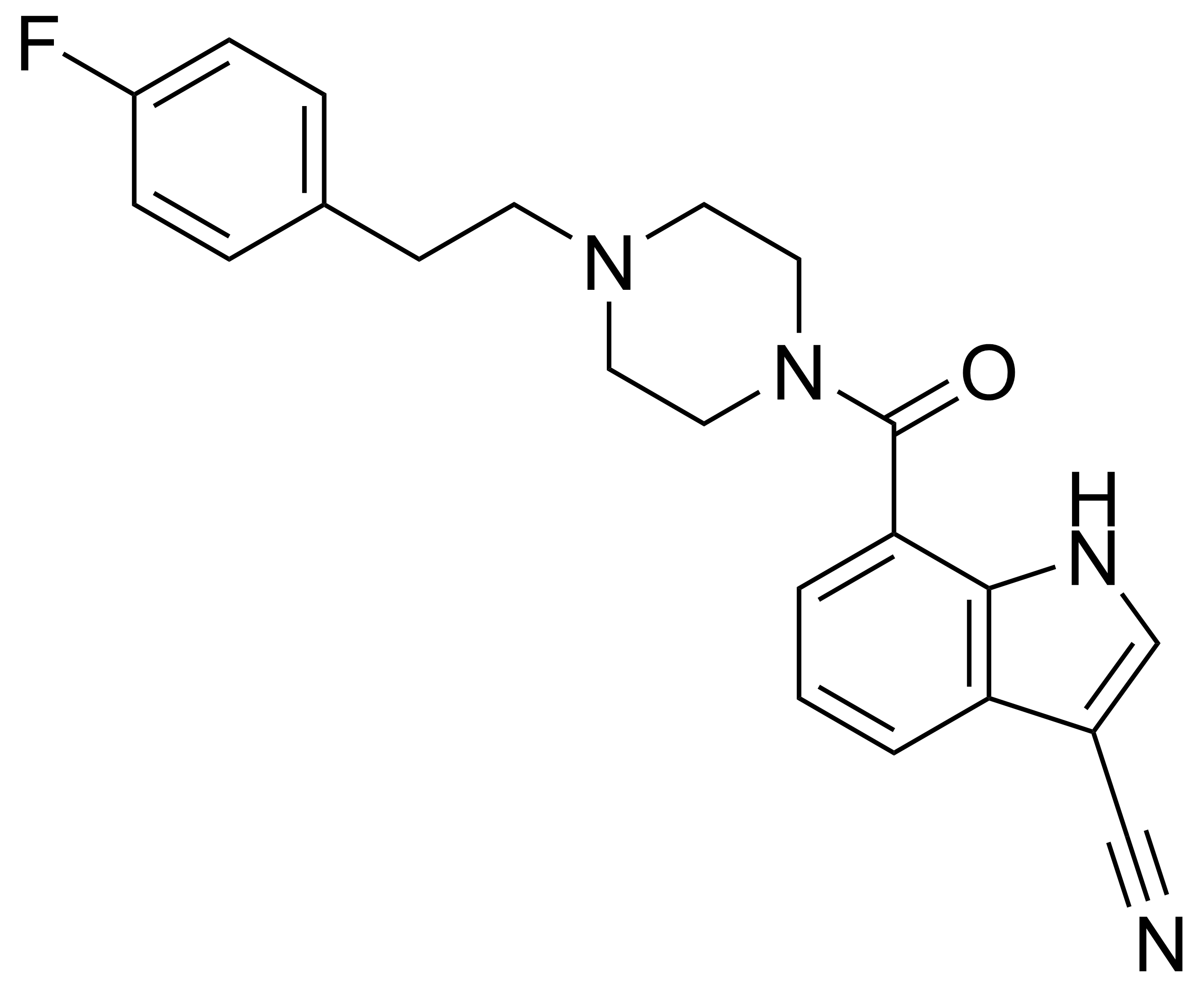

Clinical data
- Other names: EMD-281,014; EMD-281014; LY-2422347; LY2422347; LSN2411347; LSN-2411347
- Routes of administration: Oral
- Drug class: Serotonin 5-HT_{2A} receptor antagonist
- ATC code: None

Legal status
- Legal status: In general: uncontrolled

Pharmacokinetic data
- Onset of action: T_{max}: 2–3 hours (range 2–6 hours)
- Elimination half-life: 8.6–9.5 hours (range 3.9–12.4 hours)

Identifiers
- IUPAC name: 7-[4-[2-(4-fluorophenyl)ethyl]piperazine-1-carbonyl]-1H-indole-3-carbonitrile
- CAS Number: 443144-26-1 443144-27-2 (hydrochloride)
- PubChem CID: 6433122
- DrugBank: DB13094
- ChemSpider: 4938310
- UNII: UL09X1D9EM
- KEGG: D06632
- ChEBI: CHEBI:177485
- ChEMBL: ChEMBL1215661
- CompTox Dashboard (EPA): DTXSID40196133

Chemical and physical data
- Formula: C_{22}H_{21}FN_{4}O
- Molar mass: 376.435 g·mol^{−1}
- 3D model (JSmol): Interactive image
- SMILES: C1CN(CCN1CCC2=CC=C(C=C2)F)C(=O)C3=CC=CC4=C3NC=C4C#N
- InChI: InChI=1S/C22H21FN4O/c23-18-6-4-16(5-7-18)8-9-26-10-12-27(13-11-26)22(28)20-3-1-2-19-17(14-24)15-25-21(19)20/h1-7,15,25H,8-13H2; Key:AQRLDDAFYYAIJP-UHFFFAOYSA-N

Pruvanserin (INN; USAN; developmental code names EMD-281,014, LY-2422347) is a selective serotonin 5-HT_{2A} receptor antagonist which was under development by Eli Lilly and Company for the treatment of insomnia. It was in phase II clinical trials in 2008 but appears to have been discontinued as it is no longer in the company's development pipeline.

== Pharmacology ==
=== Pharmacodynamics ===
Pruvanserin acts as a selective serotonin 5-HT_{2A} receptor antagonist. In addition to its sleep-improving properties, pruvanserin has also been shown to have antidepressant, anxiolytic, and working memory-enhancing effects in animal studies.

=== Pharmacodynamics ===
The time to peak levels of pruvanserin is 2 to 3 hours, with a range of 2 to 6 hours. The mean elimination half-life of pruvanserin is 8.6 to 9.5 hours, with a range of 3.9 to 12.4 hours. However, its brain serotonin 5-HT_{2A} receptor occupancy lasts much longer, with a half-life of approximately 24 hours.

== See also ==
- Serotonin 5-HT_{2A} receptor antagonist
- List of investigational insomnia drugs
- Eplivanserin
- Pimavanserin
- Glemanserin
- Roluperidone
- Volinanserin
- Ziprasidone
- Lenperone
- Lidanserin
