= Anthranil =

Names
- Preferred IUPAC name 2,1-Benzoxazole

Identifiers
| CAS Number | 271-58-9 |
| 3D model (JSmol) | Interactive image |
| Beilstein Reference | 2222 |
| ChEBI | CHEBI:51555 |
| ChEMBL | ChEMBL508432 |
| ChemSpider | 60822 |
| ECHA InfoCard | 100.005.437 |
| EC Number | 205-980-5 |
| PubChem CID | 67498 |
| UNII | 58GQ20G9W6 |
| CompTox Dashboard (EPA) | DTXSID00181565 |
- InChI: InChI=1S/C7H5NO/c1-2-4-7-6(3-1)5-9-8-7/h1-5H Key: FZKCAHQKNJXICB-UHFFFAOYSA-N
- SMILES: n1c2ccccc2co1

Properties
| Chemical formula | C_{7}H_{5}NO |
| Molar mass | 119.123 g·mol^{−1} |
| Appearance | Colorless liquid |
| Density | 1.183 g/mL |
| Boiling point | 101–102 °C (214–216 °F; 374–375 K) |

Hazards
- GHS labelling
| Pictograms | (GHS07: Exclamation mark) |
| Signal word | Warning |
| Hazard statements | H302 |
| Precautionary statements | P264, P270, P301+P312, P330, P501 |
- Except where otherwise noted, data are given for materials in their standard state (at 25 °C [77 °F], 100 kPa). Infobox references

Anthranil (2,1-benzisoxazole) is an organic compound with a molecular formula C_{7}H_{5}NO, which features a fused benzene-isoxazole bicyclic ring structure. It is an isomer of the more common compounds benzoxazole and benzisoxazole, which have their oxygen atoms located in the 1-position. The locations of the heteroatoms in anthranil results in disrupted aromaticity, making it by far the least stable of the 3 structural isomers.
