= Neflumozide =

Chemical compound

Identifiers
- IUPAC name: 3-[1-[3-(6-fluoro-1,2-benzoxazol-3-yl)propyl]piperidin-4-yl]-1H-benzimidazol-2-one
- CAS Number: 86636-93-3
- PubChem CID: 55463
- ChemSpider: 50085
- UNII: P3WHG5IM2W
- ChEMBL: ChEMBL2111040
- CompTox Dashboard (EPA): DTXSID801006980

Chemical and physical data
- Formula: C_{22}H_{23}FN_{4}O_{2}
- Molar mass: 394.450 g·mol^{−1}
- 3D model (JSmol): Interactive image
- SMILES: C1CN(CCC1N2C3=CC=CC=C3NC2=O)CCCC4=NOC5=C4C=CC(=C5)F
- InChI: InChI=1S/C22H23FN4O2/c23-15-7-8-17-18(25-29-21(17)14-15)5-3-11-26-12-9-16(10-13-26)27-20-6-2-1-4-19(20)24-22(27)28/h1-2,4,6-8,14,16H,3,5,9-13H2,(H,24,28); Key:VEUGOXRZHKYDED-UHFFFAOYSA-N

Neflumozide is a novel antipsychotic similar in structure to benperidol. It is a derivative of isoxazole and works as an dopamine antagonist.

== See also ==
- Benperidol
