= Pirenperone =

Chemical compound

Clinical data
- Other names: R-47456; R47456; R-50656; R50656; Pirenpirone
- Drug class: Serotonin 5-HT_{2A} receptor antagonist
- ATC code: None

Pharmacokinetic data
- Elimination half-life: 4–6 hours

Identifiers
- IUPAC name: 3-[2-[4-(4-Fluorobenzoyl)piperidin-1-yl]ethyl]-2-methylpyrido[1,2-a]pyrimidin-4-one
- CAS Number: 75444-65-4
- PubChem CID: 4847
- ChemSpider: 4681
- UNII: Y9FMC4513X
- KEGG: D05495
- ChEBI: CHEBI:92444
- ChEMBL: ChEMBL18331
- CompTox Dashboard (EPA): DTXSID9045182
- ECHA InfoCard: 100.071.081

Chemical and physical data
- Formula: C_{23}H_{24}FN_{3}O_{2}
- Molar mass: 393.462 g·mol^{−1}
- 3D model (JSmol): Interactive image
- SMILES: CC1=C(C(=O)N2C=CC=CC2=N1)CCN3CCC(CC3)C(=O)C4=CC=C(C=C4)F
- InChI: InChI=1S/C23H24FN3O2/c1-16-20(23(29)27-12-3-2-4-21(27)25-16)11-15-26-13-9-18(10-14-26)22(28)17-5-7-19(24)8-6-17/h2-8,12,18H,9-11,13-15H2,1H3; Key:HXCNRYXBZNHDNE-UHFFFAOYSA-N

Pirenperone (INN, USAN, BAN; developmental code names R-47456 and R-50656) is a serotonin receptor antagonist closely related to ketanserin and risperidone which is described as an antipsychotic and tranquilizer and was never marketed.

It is a relatively selective antagonist of the serotonin 5-HT_{2A} receptor and has been used in scientific research to study the serotonin system. Its affinities (K_{i}) for serotonin and other receptors have been reported to be 0.3 to 1.1 nM for the serotonin 5-HT_{2A} receptor, 6.5 nM for the serotonin 5-HT_{7} receptor, 20 nM for the α_{1B}-adrenergic receptor, 20 nM for the α_{2B}-adrenergic receptor, 61 nM for the serotonin 5-HT_{2B} receptor, 60 to 77 nM for the serotonin 5-HT_{2C} receptor, 485 to 1,700 nM for the serotonin 5-HT_{1A} receptor, and >1,000 or 6,600 nM for the serotonin 5-HT_{1B} receptor, whereas other receptors were not reported.

The elimination half-life of pirenperone has been said to be 4 to 6 hours.

In the 1980s, the drug was found to block the effects of the lysergic acid diethylamide (LSD) in animals, and, along with ketanserin, led to the elucidation of the 5-HT_{2A} receptor as the biological mediator of the effects of serotonergic psychedelics. Along similar lines, there has been interest in pirenperone for potential use as a trip killer against psychedelics in humans.

== See also ==
- Serotonin 5-HT_{2A} receptor antagonist
- Altanserin
- Ketanserin
- Setoperone
- Risperidone
- Ocaperidone
