= Iloperidone =

Atypical antipsychotic medication

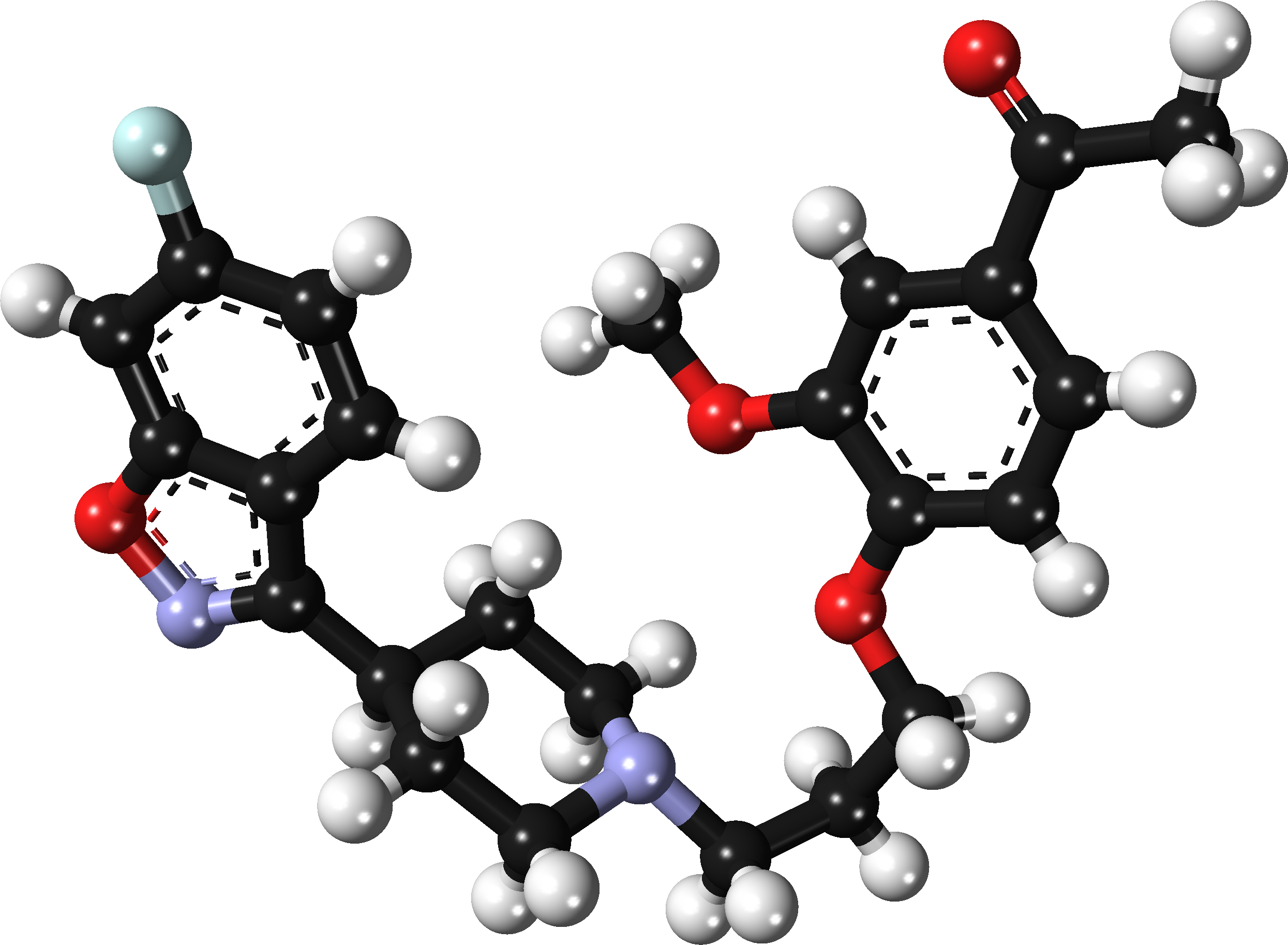

Clinical data
- Trade names: Fanapt, Zomaril
- AHFS/Drugs.com: Monograph
- MedlinePlus: a609026
- License data: US DailyMed: Iloperidone; US FDA: Iloperidone
- Routes of administration: By mouth, injection
- Drug class: Atypical antipsychotic
- ATC code: N05AX14 (WHO)

Legal status
- Legal status: US: ℞-only

Pharmacokinetic data
- Bioavailability: 96% (oral; T_{max} = 2–4 hours)
- Protein binding: ~97%
- Metabolism: Hepatic (CYP2D6-mediated hydroxylation and CYP3A4-mediated O-demethylation)
- Elimination half-life: 18–33 hours
- Excretion: urine (45.1–58.2%) and feces (19.9–22.1%)

Identifiers
- IUPAC name: 1-[4-[3-[4-(6-fluoro-1,2-benzoxazol-3-yl)piperidin-1-yl]propoxy]-3-methoxyphenyl]ethanone
- CAS Number: 133454-47-4
- PubChem CID: 71360
- IUPHAR/BPS: 87
- ChemSpider: 64459
- UNII: VPO7KJ050N
- KEGG: D02666
- ChEBI: CHEBI:65173
- ChEMBL: ChEMBL14376
- CompTox Dashboard (EPA): DTXSID6049060
- ECHA InfoCard: 100.106.441

Chemical and physical data
- Formula: C_{24}H_{27}FN_{2}O_{4}
- Molar mass: 426.488 g·mol^{−1}
- 3D model (JSmol): Interactive image
- SMILES: O=C(c4ccc(OCCCN3CCC(c2noc1cc(F)ccc12)CC3)c(OC)c4)C
- InChI: InChI=1S/C24H27FN2O4/c1-16(28)18-4-7-21(23(14-18)29-2)30-13-3-10-27-11-8-17(9-12-27)24-20-6-5-19(25)15-22(20)31-26-24/h4-7,14-15,17H,3,8-13H2,1-2H3; Key:XMXHEBAFVSFQEX-UHFFFAOYSA-N

Iloperidone, sold under the brand name Fanapt among others, is an atypical antipsychotic for the treatment of schizophrenia and bipolar I disorder.

== Medical uses ==
Iloperidone is indicated for the treatment of schizophrenia and mania or mixed episodes in bipolar I disorder. In a 2013 study in a comparison of 15 antipsychotic drugs in effectivity in treating schizophrenic symptoms, iloperidone demonstrated mild effectiveness — as effective as lurasidone, and 13 to 15% less effective than ziprasidone, chlorpromazine, and asenapine. It generally appears to work better than placebo.

== Side effects ==
Examination of the safety and tolerability of iloperidone have shown that at a 5 mg/day dose in healthy male volunteers, the drug was fairly well tolerated, although hypotension, dizziness, and somnolence were very common side effects ranging from mild to moderate in severity. A second study showed that co administration of food decreased the severity of these effects. This study also indicated that repeat administration of iloperidone could decrease the effects of hypotension.

The approved dose is 12–24 mg, not 5 mg. However, claims of better tolerance have been reported.

=== Withdrawal ===
The British National Formulary recommends a gradual taper when discontinuing antipsychotics to avoid acute withdrawal symptoms or rapid relapse. Symptoms of withdrawal commonly include nausea, vomiting, and loss of appetite. Other symptoms may include restlessness, increased sweating, and trouble sleeping. Less commonly there may be a feeling of the world spinning, numbness, or muscle pains. Symptoms generally resolve after a short period of time.

There is tentative evidence that discontinuation of antipsychotics can result in psychosis. It may also result in reoccurrence of the condition that is being treated. Rarely tardive dyskinesia can occur when the medication is stopped.

== Pharmacology ==
Iloperidone exerts its effects by acting upon and antagonizing specific neurotransmitters, particularly multiple dopamine and serotonin receptor subtypes. It is considered an 'atypical' antipsychotic because it displays serotonin receptor antagonism, similar to other atypical antipsychotics. The older typical antipsychotics are primarily dopamine antagonists.

Iloperidone has been shown to act as an antagonist at all tested receptors except for 5-HT_{2A}. It exhibits high (nM) affinity to serotonin 5-HT_{2A} (Ki value of 5.6 nM) where it acts as a inverse agonist. Antagonism occurs at all other receptors following dopamine D_{2} (6.3 nM) and D_{3} (7.1 nM) and α_{1}-adrenergic receptors (0.36 nM), moderate affinity for dopamine D_{4} (25 nM), serotonin 5-HT_{6} (43 nM), 5-HT_{7} (22 nM), and low affinity for the serotonin 5-HT_{1A} (168 nM), dopamine D_{1}, and histamine H_{1} receptors. In addition, pharmacogenomic studies identified single nucleotide polymorphisms associated with an enhanced response to iloperidone during acute treatment of schizophrenia.

== History ==
Hoechst Marion Roussel Inc. made initial inquiries into the drug; however, in May 1996, they discontinued research, and in June 1997 gave research rights to Titan Pharmaceuticals. Titan then handed over worldwide development, manufacturing and marketing rights to Novartis in August 1998. On June 9, 2004, Titan Pharmaceuticals announced that the Phase III development rights have been acquired by Vanda Pharmaceuticals. The original launch date was scheduled for 2002. On November 27, 2007, Vanda Pharmaceuticals announced that the U.S. Food and Drug Administration (FDA) had accepted their New Drug Application for iloperidone, confirming the application is ready for FDA review and approval. On July 28, 2008, the FDA issued a not-approvable letter to Vanda Pharmaceuticals concerning the drug, stating that further trials are required before a decision can be made concerning marketed usage of iloperidone.

Iloperidone was approved by the FDA for the treatment of schizophrenia in the United States on May 6, 2009. and for treating bipolar I disorder in April 2024.

== See also ==
- List of investigational anxiolytics
- Lidanserin
