= Benperidol =

Typical antipsychotic medication

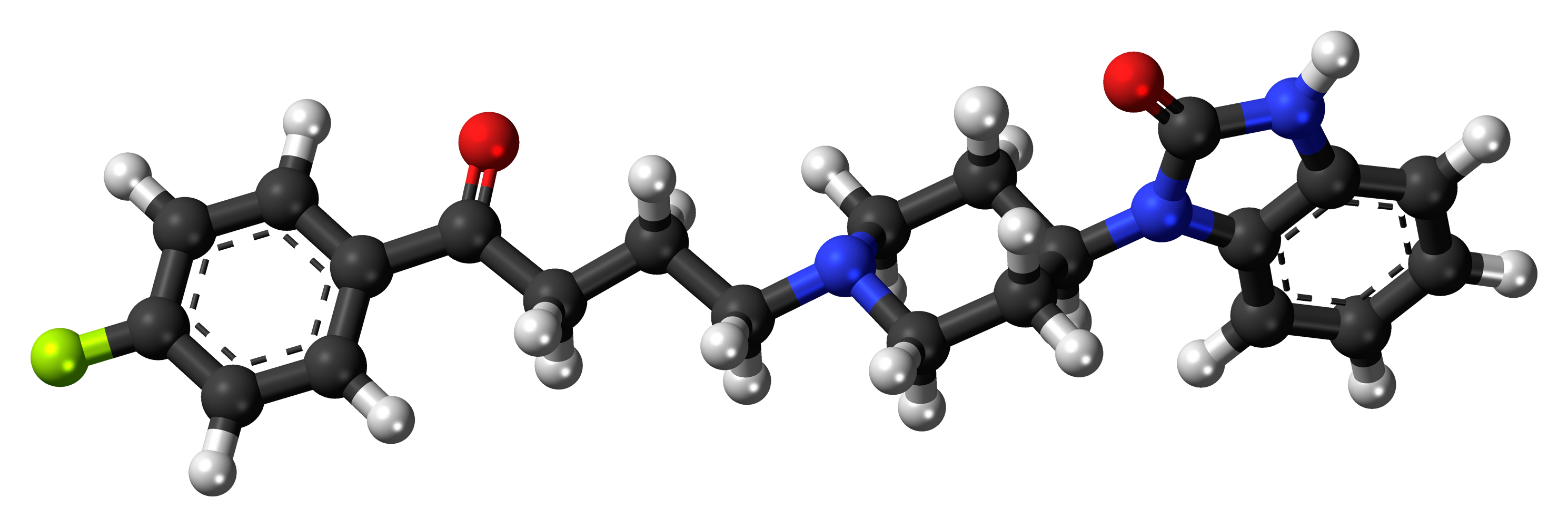

Clinical data
- Trade names: Anquil, Frenactil
- AHFS/Drugs.com: International Drug Names
- Routes of administration: Oral
- ATC code: N05AD07 (WHO)

Legal status
- Legal status: AU: S4 (Prescription only); US: ℞-only

Pharmacokinetic data
- Elimination half-life: 8 hours

Identifiers
- IUPAC name: 1-{1-[4-(4-fluorophenyl)-4-oxobutyl]piperidin-4-yl}-1,3-dihydro-2H-benzimidazol-2-one
- CAS Number: 2062-84-2
- PubChem CID: 16363
- DrugBank: DB12867
- ChemSpider: 15521
- UNII: 97O6X78C53
- KEGG: D02627
- ChEBI: CHEBI:93403
- ChEMBL: ChEMBL297302
- CompTox Dashboard (EPA): DTXSID7045364
- ECHA InfoCard: 100.016.521

Chemical and physical data
- Formula: C_{22}H_{24}FN_{3}O_{2}
- Molar mass: 381.451 g·mol^{−1}
- 3D model (JSmol): Interactive image
- SMILES: Fc1ccc(cc1)C(=O)CCCN4CCC(N3c2ccccc2NC3=O)CC4
- InChI: InChI=1S/C22H24FN3O2/c23-17-9-7-16(8-10-17)21(27)6-3-13-25-14-11-18(12-15-25)26-20-5-2-1-4-19(20)24-22(26)28/h1-2,4-5,7-10,18H,3,6,11-15H2,(H,24,28); Key:FEBOTPHFXYHVPL-UHFFFAOYSA-N

Benperidol, sold under the trade name Anquil among others, is a typical antipsychotic primarily used to treat hypersexuality syndromes and can be used to treat schizophrenia. It is a highly potent butyrophenone derivative and is the most potent neuroleptic in the European market, with chlorpromazine equivalency as high as 75 to 100 (about 150 to 200% the potency per dose of haloperidol). It is sometimes prescribed to sex offenders as a condition of their parole, as an alternative to anti-androgen drugs such as cyproterone acetate.

Benperidol was discovered by Janssen Pharmaceutica in 1961 and has been marketed since 1966. It is mainly used in Germany, but it is also available in Belgium, Greece, the Netherlands, and the United Kingdom.

== Pharmacology ==
=== Pharmacodynamics ===
Benperidol is a strong dopamine receptor antagonist (D_{2} (K_{i} 0.027 nM) and D_{4} (K_{i} 0.066 nM)) with weaker serotonin receptor antagonism (5-HT_{2A} (K_{i} 3.75 nM)). In high doses, it has antihistaminergic and alpha-adrenergic properties. It possesses minimal anticholinergic properties.

Benperidol
Site	K_{i} (nM)	Action	Ref
5-HT_{2A}	3.75	Antagonist	
D_{1}	4,100	Antagonist	
D_{2}	0.027	Antagonist	
D_{4}	0.06	Antagonist	

Although benperidol was developed relatively early in the history of antipsychotic drugs, it exhibits a uniquely high and selective affinity for the human dopamine D_{2} receptor when compared with all other human dopamine receptor subtypes. This is evident from its nanomolar binding affinities, which stand out even among both typical and atypical antipsychotics. Benperidol is also considered to possess one of the greatest selectivity ratios for dopamine receptors over 5-HT_{2A} serotonin receptors, although this distinction is surpassed by certain neuroleptics such as amisulpride and sulpiride. Dopamine receptors play central roles not only in cognition, emotion, and motor control—key domains affected in schizophrenia—but also in various unconscious biological processes. The emphasis on D_{2} receptor blockade in antipsychotic drug design stems from its critical role in these functions and its dense expression in brain regions implicated in schizophrenia, such as the striatum and frontal cortex. Benperidol's preferential binding to the D_{2} receptor—over other dopamine receptor subtypes such as D_{3} and D_{4}—is also unusually strong, with approximately a twofold greater selectivity. This distinguishes it from antipsychotics like haloperidol and perphenazine, which show more balanced D_{2}/D_{3} binding ratios (e.g., 0.7–0.3 or 0.13), as well as from cariprazine, which demonstrates an even higher D_{3} affinity relative to D_{2} (D_{2}–D_{3} ratio of 0.49–0.085).

=== Pharmacokinetics ===
Benperidol is absorbed well and undergoes extensive first pass metabolism. One percent of benperidol is excreted in urine. The half-life of benperidol is 8 hours.

== Synthesis ==
4-(2-Keto-1-benzimidazolinyl)piperidine (1) is alkylated with 4-chloro-4'-fluorobutyrophenone (2) to produce benperidol (3).

== See also ==
- Timiperone has a similar chemical structure with a thiourea group instead of a urea group.
- Pimozide, bezitramide, oxiperomide, and neflumozide) are also made from 4-(1-benzimidazolinone)piperidine precursor
- Droperidol is similar, but has a tetrahydropyridine ring.
