= Benzoxazole =

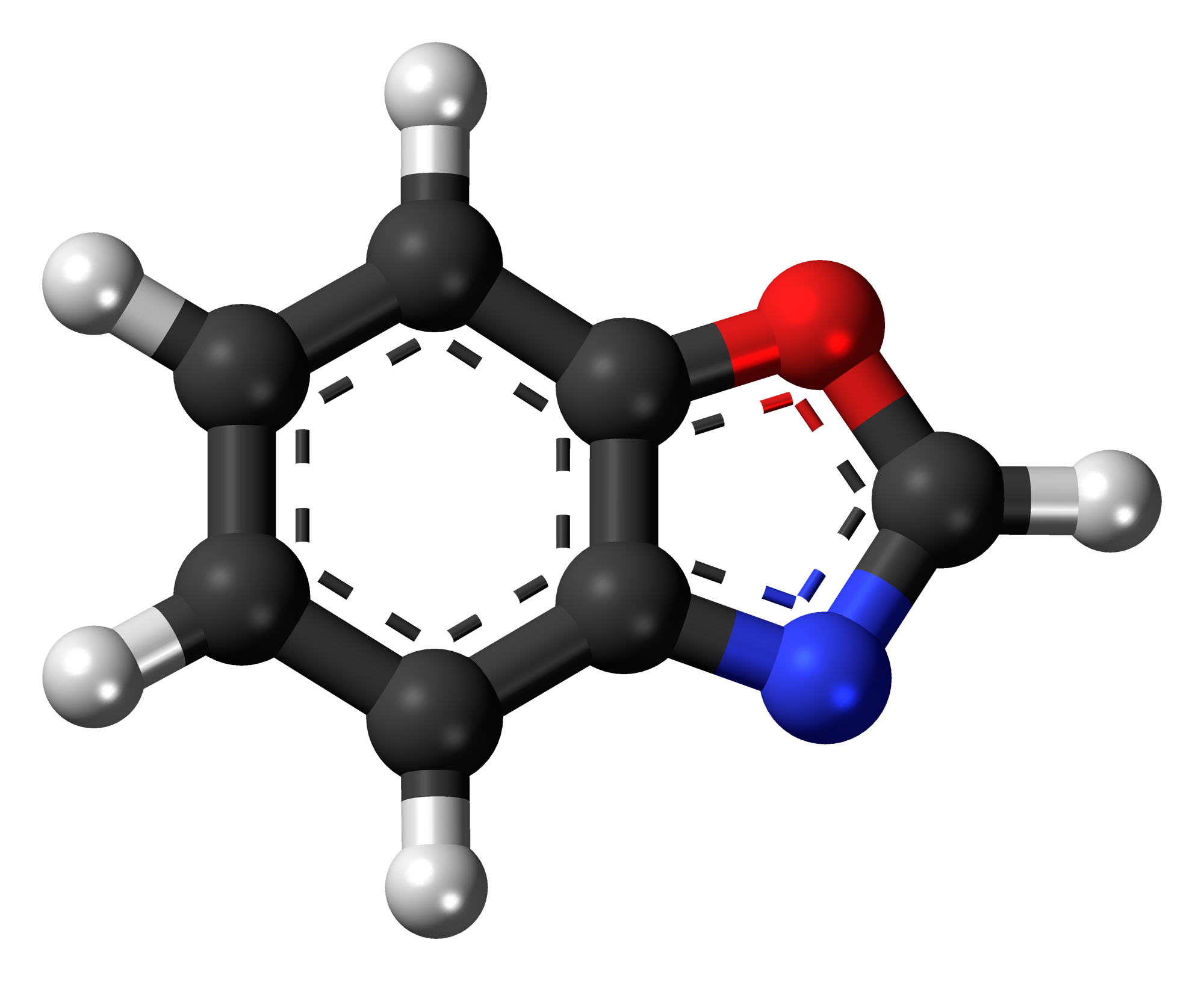

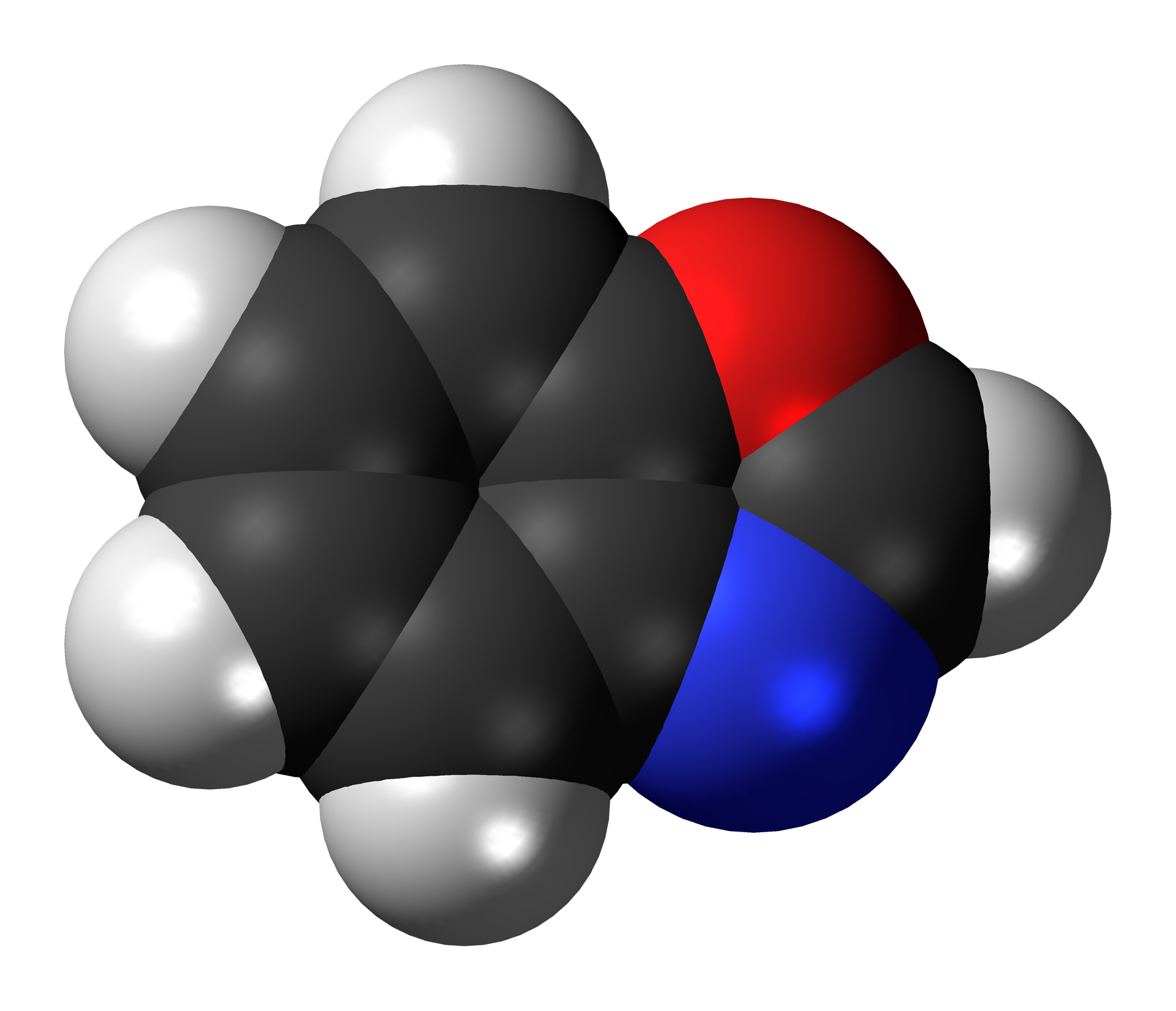

Names
- Preferred IUPAC name 1,3-Benzoxazole
- Other names 1-Oxa-3-aza-1H-indene

Identifiers
CAS Number	273-53-0
3D model (JSmol)	Interactive image
ChEBI	CHEBI:38814
ChEMBL	ChEMBL451894
ChemSpider	8873
ECHA InfoCard	100.005.445
PubChem CID	9228
UNII	J233Y1I55I
CompTox Dashboard (EPA)	DTXSID8059768
- InChI: InChI=1S/C7H5NO/c1-2-4-7-6(3-1)8-5-9-7/h1-5H Key: BCMCBBGGLRIHSE-UHFFFAOYSA-N; InChI=1/C7H5NO/c1-2-4-7-6(3-1)8-5-9-7/h1-5H Key: BCMCBBGGLRIHSE-UHFFFAOYAP
- SMILES: n1c2ccccc2oc1

Properties
Chemical formula	C_{7}H_{5}NO
Molar mass	119.123 g·mol^{−1}
Appearance	White to light yellow solid
Melting point	27 to 30 °C (81 to 86 °F; 300 to 303 K)
Boiling point	182 °C (360 °F; 455 K)
Solubility in water	Insoluble

Hazards
Flash point	58 °C (136 °F; 331 K)

Related compounds
Related compounds	oxazole indole benzofuran
- Except where otherwise noted, data are given for materials in their standard state (at 25 °C [77 °F], 100 kPa). verify (what is ?) Infobox references

Benzoxazole is an aromatic organic compound with a molecular formula C_{7}H_{5}NO, a benzene-fused oxazole ring structure, and an odor similar to pyridine. Although benzoxazole itself is of little practical value, many derivatives of benzoxazoles are commercially important.

Being a heterocyclic compound, benzoxazole finds use in research as a starting material for the synthesis of larger, usually bioactive structures. Its aromaticity makes it relatively stable, although as a heterocycle, it has reactive sites which allow for functionalization.

== Occurrence and applications ==
It is found within the chemical structures of pharmaceutical drugs such as flunoxaprofen and tafamidis. Benzoxazole derivatives are also of interest for optical brighteners in laundry detergents. Benzoxazoles belong to the group of well-known antifungal agents with antioxidant, antiallergic, antitumoral and antiparasitic activity.

4,4'-(E)-bis(benzoxazolyl)stilbene is intensely fluorescent and its derivatives are used as optical brighteners

2,5-bis(benzoxazol-2-yl)thiophene is also intensely fluorescent and its derivatives are used as optical brighteners, e.g. in laundry detergents

== See also ==
Structural isomers

- Anthranil, an analog with the oxygen atom in position 2
- Benzisoxazole, an analog with the nitrogen atom in position 2

Analogs

- Benzimidazole, an analog with the oxygen replaced by a nitrogen
- Benzothiazole, an analog with the oxygen replaced by a sulfur
- Benzopyrrole or indole, an analog without the oxygen atom
- Benzofuran, an analog without the nitrogen atom
