= Butyrophenone =

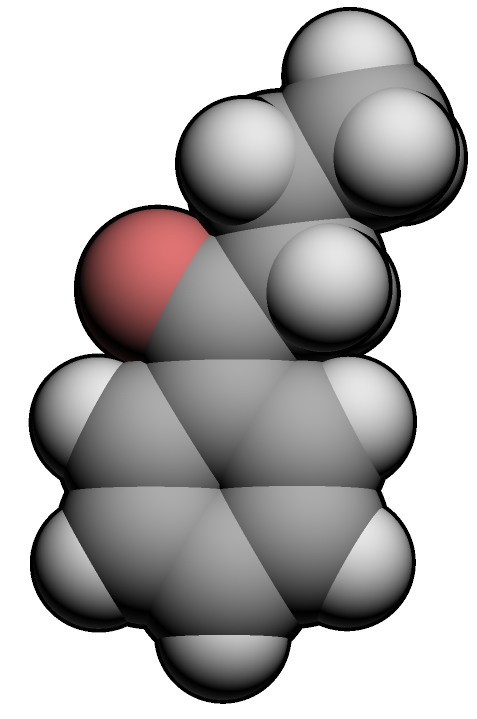

Names
- Preferred IUPAC name 1-Phenylbutan-1-one

Identifiers
CAS Number	495-40-9
3D model (JSmol)	Interactive image; Interactive image
ChEMBL	ChEMBL193524
ChemSpider	9893
ECHA InfoCard	100.007.091
PubChem CID	10315
UNII	186I11WB5B
CompTox Dashboard (EPA)	DTXSID3047059
- InChI: InChI=1S/C10H12O/c1-2-6-10(11)9-7-4-3-5-8-9/h3-5,7-8H,2,6H2,1H3 Key: FFSAXUULYPJSKH-UHFFFAOYSA-N; InChI=1/C10H12O/c1-2-6-10(11)9-7-4-3-5-8-9/h3-5,7-8H,2,6H2,1H3 Key: FFSAXUULYPJSKH-UHFFFAOYAC
- SMILES: O=C(c1ccccc1)CCC; CCCC(=O)c1ccccc1

Properties
Chemical formula	C_{10}H_{12}O
Molar mass	148.20 g/mol
Appearance	clear liquid
Melting point	12 °C (54 °F; 285 K)
Boiling point	229 °C (444 °F; 502 K)
Solubility in water	poor
log P	2.77
Refractive index (n_{D})	1.520

Hazards
NFPA 704 (fire diamond)	1 1 1
Flash point	99 °C (210 °F; 372 K)
- Except where otherwise noted, data are given for materials in their standard state (at 25 °C [77 °F], 100 kPa). verify (what is ?) Infobox references

Butyrophenone is an organic compound with the formula C_{6}H_{5}C(O)C_{3}H_{7}. It is a colorless liquid.

The butyrophenone structure—a ketone flanked by a phenyl ring and a propyl chain—forms the basis for many other chemicals containing various substituents. Some of these butyrophenones are used to treat various psychiatric disorders such as schizophrenia, as well as acting as antiemetics.

Examples of butyrophenone-derived pharmaceuticals include:

- Benperidol‡ (200 times more potent than chlorpromazine)
- Bromperidol†
- Droperidol‡, Antiemetic for postoperative nausea and vomiting
- Haloperidol, the most widely used classical antipsychotic drug in this class
- Lumateperone, an atypical antipsychotic used for schizophrenia and bipolar depression
- Moperone (discontinued)†
- Pipamperone (discontinued)†
- Timiperone†
- Lenperone
- Melperone
- α-Pyrrolidinobutiophenone
