= Titan Pharmaceuticals =

American pharmaceutical company

Titan Pharmaceuticals, Inc.
- Company type: Public
- Traded as: Nasdaq: TTNP
- Industry: Pharmaceuticals
- Headquarters: California
- Key people: David Lazar (CEO); Dane D. Hallberg (CCO)
- Revenue: ▲$1.7 million
- Total assets: ▲$8.4 million
- Number of employees: 14 (Nov 2018)
- Website: titanpharm.com

Titan Pharmaceuticals, Inc. is a biopharmaceutical company based in San Francisco, CA, developing proprietary therapeutics primarily for treating central nervous system ("CNS") disorders. In September 2018, Titan Pharmaceuticals underwent an IPO wherein it raised $9.5 million in gross proceeds. In the same month, it also posted approximately $1.7 million in revenue, in large part drawn from its licensing for its European intellectual property rights for Probuphine to the Italian pharmaceutical company Molteni – a leading European opioid manufacturer and also a subsidiary of the German Pharmaceutical juggernaut Merck Group.

Titan's principal asset is Probuphine, a slow-release implant formulation of buprenorphine for the treatment of opioid addiction or chronic pain. FDA Approval was granted on 26 May 2016. It was licensed to Braeburn Pharmaceuticals for marketing and commercialization.

== History ==
The company was founded in 1992 and is headquartered in San Francisco, California.

In August 2022, David Lazar was appointed chairman and CEO. He succeeded Marc Rubin, who had held the position since October 2007.

In 2024, the company entered into a merger agreement and became a wholly owned subsidiary of BSKE Ltd.
