= Ocaperidone =

Names
- Preferred IUPAC name 3-{2-[4-(6-Fluoro-1,2-benzoxazol-3-yl)piperidin-1-yl]ethyl}-2,9-dimethyl-4H-pyrido[1,2-a]pyrimidin-4-one

Identifiers
CAS Number	129029-23-8
3D model (JSmol)	Interactive image
ChemSpider	64451
IUPHAR/BPS	46
KEGG	D02675
MeSH	C072259
PubChem CID	71351
UNII	26HUS7139V
CompTox Dashboard (EPA)	DTXSID10156042
- InChI: InChI=1S/C24H25FN4O2/c1-15-4-3-10-29-23(15)26-16(2)19(24(29)30)9-13-28-11-7-17(8-12-28)22-20-6-5-18(25)14-21(20)31-27-22/h3-6,10,14,17H,7-9,11-13H2,1-2H3 Key: ZZQNEJILGNNOEP-UHFFFAOYSA-N; InChI=1/C24H25FN4O2/c1-15-4-3-10-29-23(15)26-16(2)19(24(29)30)9-13-28-11-7-17(8-12-28)22-20-6-5-18(25)14-21(20)31-27-22/h3-6,10,14,17H,7-9,11-13H2,1-2H3 Key: ZZQNEJILGNNOEP-UHFFFAOYAT
- SMILES: CC1=CC=CN2C1=NC(=C(C2=O)CCN3CCC(CC3)C4=NOC5=C4C=CC(=C5)F)C

Properties
Chemical formula	C_{24}H_{25}FN_{4}O_{2}
Molar mass	420.488 g·mol^{−1}
- Except where otherwise noted, data are given for materials in their standard state (at 25 °C [77 °F], 100 kPa). Infobox references

Ocaperidone (R 79598) is a benzisoxazole antipsychotic. It was initially developed by Janssen, later licensed to French laboratory Neuro3D and then acquired in 2007 by German company Evotec. It was found to be more potent than risperidone in animal studies, but its testing was abandoned in 2010 after unfavorable results in human Phase II trials, as while it was effective at controlling symptoms of schizophrenia, ocaperidone produced an unacceptable amount of extrapyramidal side effects.

== Synthesis ==
The last step requires attachment of the sidechain between 3-(2-bromoethyl)-2,9-dimethyl 4H-pyrido[1,2-a]pyrimidin-4-one (1) and 6-fluoro-3-(4-piperidinyl)-1,2-benzisoxazole (2) completing the convergent synthesis of ocaperidone (3).

Patented method for the synthesis of ocaperidone

== See also ==
- List of investigational antipsychotics
- Benperidol
- Trifluperidol
- Pirenperone
