= Bitertanol =

Names
- IUPAC name 3,3-dimethyl-1-(4-phenylphenoxy)-1-(1,2,4-triazol-1-yl)butan-2-ol
- Other names: Baycor; Biloxazol

Identifiers
| CAS Number | 55179-31-2 |
| 3D model (JSmol) | Interactive image |
| ChEBI | CHEBI:83851 |
| ChEMBL | ChEMBL1566634 |
| ChemSpider | 82759 |
| ECHA InfoCard | 100.054.084 |
| EC Number | 259-513-5 |
| KEGG | C11258 |
| PubChem CID | 91656 |
| CompTox Dashboard (EPA) | DTXSID2037502 |
- InChI: InChI=1S/C20H23N3O2/c1-20(2,3)18(24)19(23-14-21-13-22-23)25-17-11-9-16(10-12-17)15-7-5-4-6-8-15/h4-14,18-19,24H,1-3H3 Key: VGPIBGGRCVEHQZ-UHFFFAOYSA-N
- SMILES: CC(C)(C)C(C(N1C=NC=N1)OC2=CC=C(C=C2)C3=CC=CC=C3)O

Properties
| Chemical formula | C_{20}H_{23}N_{3}O_{2} |
| Molar mass | 337.423 g·mol^{−1} |
| Appearance | colorless |
| Density | 1.16 g·cm^{−3} |
| log P | 4.1 |
| Vapor pressure | 0.0000075 mmHg |

Hazards
- GHS labelling
| Pictograms | (GHS06: Toxic) (GHS07: Exclamation mark) |
| Signal word | Danger |
| Hazard statements | H302, H330 |
| Precautionary statements | P260, P264, P270, P271, P284, P301+P317, P304+P340, P316, P320, P330, P403+P233, P405, P501 |
- Except where otherwise noted, data are given for materials in their standard state (at 25 °C [77 °F], 100 kPa). Infobox references

Bitertanol is a mixture of four isomers, which are chemical compounds belonging to the triazole and biphenyl derivative classes.

== Properties ==
Bitertanol is a colorless, water-insoluble solid. The commercial product is a 20:80 mixture of the (1RS,2RS)- and (1RS,2SR)-isomers.

Stereoisomers of bitertanol, showing the Cahn-Ingold-Prelog convention-configuration and content in the technical product

(1R,2R)-bitertanol (approx. 10%)

(1S,2S)-Bitertanol (approx. 10%)

(1R,2S)-Bitertanol (approx. 40%)

(1S,2R)-Bitertanol (approx. 40%)

It is highly stable toward photolysis and hydrolysis. Its half-life in aqueous suspension is 39.2 days.

== Synthesis ==
Bitertanol can be prepared via a multi-step reaction starting from 3,3-dimethyl-2-butanone: chlorination with elemental chlorine is followed by nucleophilic substitution of the chlorine atom with 4-phenylphenol, bromination with elemental bromine, subsequent nucleophilic substitution with 1,2,4-triazole, and final reduction of the ketone with hydrogen.

Synthesis of Bitertanol

== Uses ==
Bitertanol is used as a fungicide for the preventive or curative treatment of diseases in fruit and vegetable crops, including Venturia species and Monilia laxa in stone fruit, as well as a seed treatment against Fusarium, Septoria, wheat scab, and other pathogens. It was introduced to the market in 1979 by Bayer AG.

== Approval ==
The European Union approved its use as an active substance in plant protection products, effective January 1, 2012, specifically as a fungicide for seed treatment. This approval expired in August 2013.

In European countries such as Germany and Austria, as well as Switzerland, no plant protection products containing this active substance are approved.
