= 4-Phenylphenol =

Names
- Preferred IUPAC name [1,1′-Biphenyl]-4-ol
- Other names 4-Hydroxybiphenyl; 4-Phenylphenol; (1,1'-Biphenyl)-4-ol; 1-Hydroxy-4-phenylbenzene; 4-Biphenylol; 4-Diphenylol; 4-Hydroxydiphenyl

Identifiers
CAS Number	92-69-3
3D model (JSmol)	Interactive image
ChEBI	CHEBI:34422
ChEMBL	ChEMBL73380
ChemSpider	13846658
ECHA InfoCard	100.001.982
EC Number	202-179-2
KEGG	C14224
PubChem CID	7103
UNII	50LH4BZ6MD
CompTox Dashboard (EPA)	DTXSID7021152
- InChI: InChI=1S/C12H10O/c13-12-8-6-11(7-9-12)10-4-2-1-3-5-10/h1-9,13H Key: YXVFYQXJAXKLAK-UHFFFAOYSA-N
- SMILES: C1=CC=C(C=C1)C2=CC=C(C=C2)O

Properties
Chemical formula	C_{12}H_{10}O
Molar mass	170.211 g·mol^{−1}
Melting point	164–165 °C (327–329 °F; 437–438 K)
Boiling point	305–308 °C (581–586 °F; 578–581 K)

Hazards
- GHS labelling
Pictograms	(GHS07: Exclamation mark) (GHS09: Environmental hazard)
Signal word	Warning
Hazard statements	H315, H319, H335, H411
Precautionary statements	P261, P264, P271, P273, P280, P302+P352, P304+P340, P305+P351+P338, P312, P321, P332+P313, P337+P313, P362, P391, P403+P233, P405, P501
- Except where otherwise noted, data are given for materials in their standard state (at 25 °C [77 °F], 100 kPa). Infobox references

4-Phenylphenol is an organic compound with the formula C_{6}H_{5}−C_{6}H_{4}OH. It is one of three isomers of hydroxybiphenyl.

== Production ==
4-Phenylphenol is produced as a byproduct in the conversion of chlorobenzene to phenol with base. It can also be obtain by sulfonation of biphenyl to give 4-biphenylsulfonic acid, which can be hydrolyzed.

Of academic interest, 4-phenylphenol can be obtained from the Suzuki coupling of phenylboronic acid with 4-iodophenol in the presence of 10% palladium on carbon and potassium carbonate.

== Properties ==
4-Phenylphenol is a flammable, difficult to ignite, white, scaly solid with a phenol-like odor that is very slightly soluble in water.

== Applications ==
Known applications include in the synthesis of paxamate & bitertanol.
