= Setoperone =

Clinical data
- Other names: R-52245; R52245
- Drug class: Serotonin 5-HT_{2A} receptor antagonist
- ATC code: None

Identifiers
- IUPAC name: 6-{2-[4-(4-fluorobenzoyl)piperidin-1-yl]ethyl}-7-methyl-2,3-dihydro-5H-[1,3]thiazolo[3,2-a]pyrimidin-5-one
- CAS Number: 86487-64-1
- PubChem CID: 68604
- ChemSpider: 61870
- UNII: BQ67CS3Q3E
- KEGG: D02686
- CompTox Dashboard (EPA): DTXSID9057848

Chemical and physical data
- Formula: C_{21}H_{24}FN_{3}O_{2}S
- Molar mass: 401.50 g·mol^{−1}
- 3D model (JSmol): Interactive image
- SMILES: CC1=C(C(=O)N2CCSC2=N1)CCN3CCC(CC3)C(=O)C4=CC=C(C=C4)F
- InChI: InChI=1S/C21H24FN3O2S/c1-14-18(20(27)25-12-13-28-21(25)23-14)8-11-24-9-6-16(7-10-24)19(26)15-2-4-17(22)5-3-15/h2-5,16H,6-13H2,1H3; Key:RBGAHDDQSRBDOG-UHFFFAOYSA-N

Setoperone (INN; USAN; developmental code name R-52245) is a compound that is a ligand to the 5-HT_{2A} receptor. It can be radiolabeled with the radioisotope fluorine-18 and used as a radioligand with positron emission tomography (PET). Several research studies have used the radiolabeled setoperone in neuroimaging for the studying neuropsychiatric disorders, such as depression or schizophrenia. The drug was first described by at least 1984.

== Chemistry ==
=== Synthesis ===
Synthesis: Radiolabelled:

The starting material is called 6-(2-hydroxyethyl)-7-methyl-2,3-dihydro-[1,3]thiazolo[3,2-a]pyrimidin-5-one, CID:15586462 (1). Halogenation of this with hydrobromic acid in acetic acid gives CID:15586463 (2). Sn2 alkylation with 4-(4-fluorobenzoyl)piperidine [56346-57-7] (3) under Finkelstein reaction conditions affords setoperone (4).

== See also ==
- Serotonin 5-HT_{2A} receptor antagonist
- Altanserin
- Ketanserin
- Pirenperone
- Ritanserin
