= Ketanserin =

Antihypertensive agent

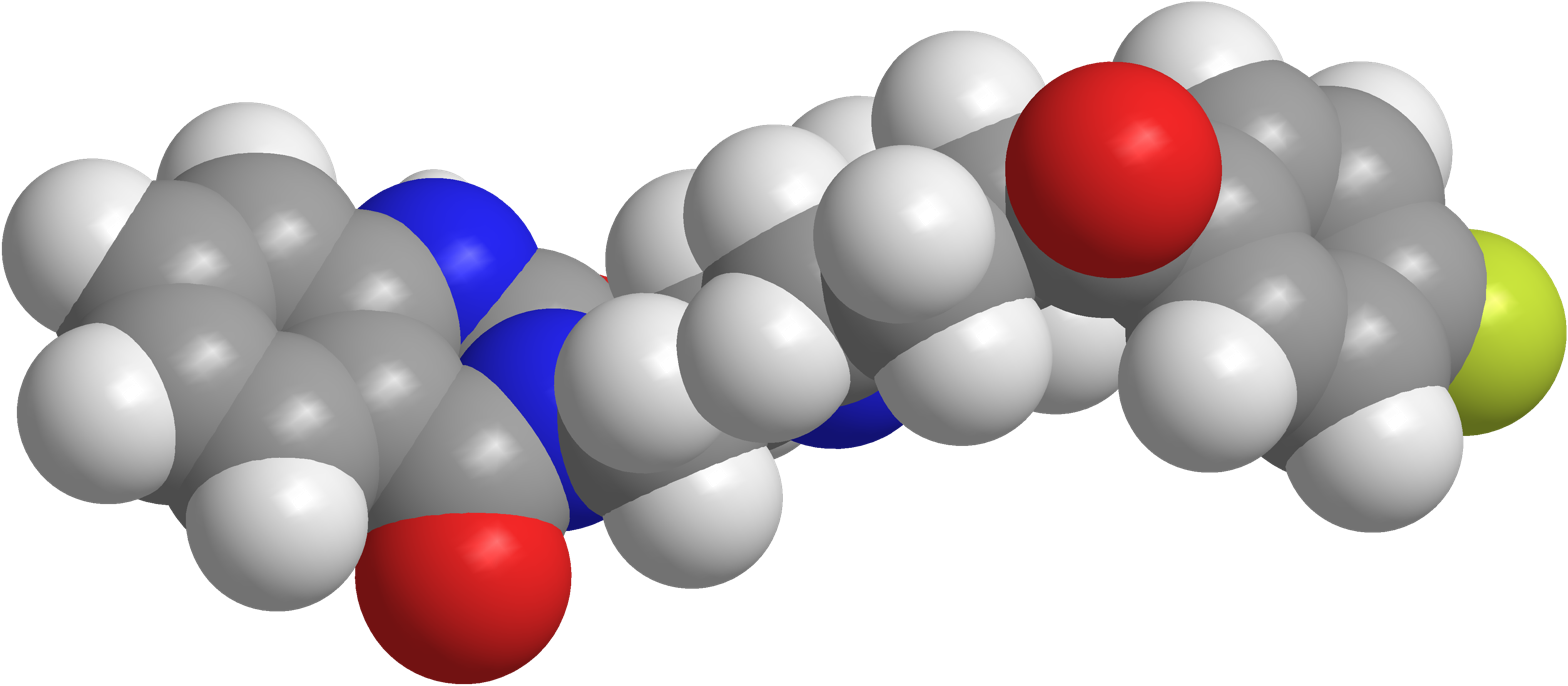

Clinical data
- Trade names: Sufrexal, Serefrex
- Other names: R-41468; R41468; R-41,468; KJK-945; R-49945; R49945
- AHFS/Drugs.com: International Drug Names
- Routes of administration: Oral
- Drug class: Serotonin 5-HT_{2A} receptor antagonist
- ATC code: C02KD01 (WHO) QD03AX90 (WHO)

Legal status
- Legal status: In general: ℞ (Prescription only)

Pharmacokinetic data
- Bioavailability: 50%
- Protein binding: 95% (mainly albumin)
- Metabolism: Extensive
- Metabolites: • Ketanserin-ol
- Onset of action: T_{max}: 0.53–2.3 hours (range 0.25–5.0 hours)
- Elimination half-life: 3.5–29 hours
- Excretion: Urine; 2% unchanged

Identifiers
- IUPAC name: 3-{2-[4-(4-fluorobenzoyl)piperidin-1-yl]ethyl}quinazoline-2,4(1H,3H)-dione
- CAS Number: 74050-98-9
- PubChem CID: 3822
- IUPHAR/BPS: 88
- DrugBank: DB12465
- ChemSpider: 3690
- UNII: 97F9DE4CT4
- KEGG: D02363
- ChEBI: CHEBI:6123
- ChEMBL: ChEMBL51
- CompTox Dashboard (EPA): DTXSID3023188
- ECHA InfoCard: 100.070.598

Chemical and physical data
- Formula: C_{22}H_{22}FN_{3}O_{3}
- Molar mass: 395.434 g·mol^{−1}
- 3D model (JSmol): Interactive image
- SMILES: c1ccc2c(c1)c(=O)n(c(=O)[nH]2)CCN3CCC(CC3)C(=O)c4ccc(cc4)F
- InChI: InChI=1S/C22H22FN3O3/c23-17-7-5-15(6-8-17)20(27)16-9-11-25(12-10-16)13-14-26-21(28)18-3-1-2-4-19(18)24-22(26)29/h1-8,16H,9-14H2,(H,24,29); Key:FPCCSQOGAWCVBH-UHFFFAOYSA-N

Ketanserin, sold under the brand name Sufrexal, is an antihypertensive agent which is used to treat arterial hypertension and vasospastic disorders. It is also used in scientific research as an antiserotonergic agent in the study of the serotonin system; specifically, the 5-HT_{2} receptor family. The drug is taken orally.

Side effects of ketanserin include dizziness, tiredness, edema, dry mouth, weight gain, and QT interval prolongation. Ketanserin acts as a selective antagonist of the serotonin 5-HT_{2A}, α_{1}-adrenergic, and histamine H_{1} receptors. It also shows lower affinity for various other targets.

Ketanserin was discovered at Janssen Pharmaceutica in 1980. It was the first serotonin 5-HT_{2A} receptor antagonist to be discovered that showed selectivity over other serotonin receptors. The drug is not available in the United States and is mostly no longer marketed throughout the rest of the world.

== Uses ==
=== Medical uses ===
Ketanserin is classified as an antihypertensive by the World Health Organization and the National Institute of Health.

It has been used to reverse pulmonary hypertension caused by protamine (which in turn was administered to reverse the effects of heparin overdose).

The reduction in hypertension is not associated with reflex tachycardia.

It has been used in cardiac surgery.

A 2000 Cochrane Review found that, compared to placebo, ketanserin did not provide significant relief for people suffering from Raynaud's phenomenon attacks in the setting of progressive systemic sclerosis (an autoimmune disorder). While the frequency of the attacks was unaffected by ketanserin, there was a reduction in the duration of the individual attacks. However, due to the significant adverse effect burden, the authors concluded that ketanserin's utility for this indication is likely unbeneficial.

Ketanserin is a selective 5-HT_{2A} receptor antagonist that was initially developed as an anti-hypertensive medicine. However, now the drug is available as a topical gel formulation for treating wounds, burns, ulcers, and anal fissures. Its action is through the acceleration of epithelialization.

=== Research uses ===
With tritium (^{3}H) radioactively labeled ketanserin is used as a radioligand for serotonin 5-HT_{2} receptors, e.g. in receptor binding assays and autoradiography. This radio-labeling has enabled the study of serotonin 5-HT_{2A} receptor distribution in the human brain.

An autoradiography study of the human cerebellum has found an increasing binding of ^{3}H-ketanserin with age (from below 50 femtomol per milligram tissue at around 30 years of age to over 100 above 75 years). The same research team found no significant correlation with age in their homogenate binding study.

Ketanserin has also been used with carbon (^{11}C) radioactively labeled NNC112 in order to image cortical D_{1} receptors without contamination by 5-HT_{2} receptors.

Increasing research into the use of psychedelics as antidepressants has seen ketanserin used to both block the hallucinogenic experience, and to disentangle the specific cognitive effects of 5-HT_{2A} activation. Ketanserin has been found to block the psychedelic effects of psilocybin, lysergic acid diethylamide (LSD), mescaline, and ayahuasca (dimethyltryptamine) in clinical studies.

== Pharmacology ==
Human molecular targets of ketanserin
Target	Affinity (K_{i})	Action	Ref(s)
5-HT_{1A}	1,044–>10,000 nM	Antagonist	
5-HT_{1B}	2,515–6,300 nM	Antagonist	
5-HT_{1D}	32–>10,000 nM	Antagonist	
5-HT_{1E}	>10,000 nM		
5-HT_{1F}	1.25–>10,000 nM		
5-HT_{2A}	0.20–9.8 nM	Antagonist	
5-HT_{2B}	200–3,236 nM	Antagonist	
5-HT_{2C}	17–186 nM	Antagonist	
5-HT_{3}	>10,000 nM (rodent)		
5-HT_{4L}	1,000 nM (rat)		
5-HT_{5A}	20,000 nM	Antagonist	
5-HT_{5B}	1,000–1,585 nM (rodent)		
5-HT_{6}	2,800 nM		
5-HT_{7}	320–1,334 nM	Antagonist	
D_{1}	190–464 nM	Antagonist	
D_{2}	>10,000 nM		
D_{3}	?		
D_{4}	148 nM (canine)		
D_{5}	2,500 nM	Antagonist	
α_{1A}	6.3 nM	Antagonist	
α_{1B}	6.3 nM	Antagonist	
α_{1D}	16 nM	Antagonist	
α_{2A}	372 nM (HT29)		
α_{2B}	199 nM		
α_{2C}	159 nM (opossum)		
H_{1}	1.79 nM	Antagonist	
DAT	>10,000 nM		
VMAT1	1,600 nM	Inhibition	
VMAT2	22–540 nM	Inhibition	

=== Pharmacodynamics ===
Ketanserin is a high-affinity non-selective antagonist of 5-HT_{2} receptors in rodents. In addition to the 5-HT_{2} receptors, ketanserin is also a high affinity antagonist for the H_{1} receptor. It has also been found to block the vesicular monoamine transporter 2 (VMAT2).

Occupancy of the serotonin 5-HT_{2A} receptor by ketanserin in humans has been studied.

=== Pharmacokinetics ===
The bioavailability of ketanserin is 50%. Its time to peak levels is 0.53 to 2.3 hours on average, with a range of 0.25 to 5.0 hours. The drug's ability to cross the blood–brain barrier varies in different species, with higher permeability in humans, monkeys, and minipigs than in mice or rats. This is probably due to ketanserin being a P-glycoprotein substrate and due to varying capacity of P-glycoprotein in limiting blood–brain barrier penetration in different species. The plasma protein binding of ketanserin is 95.0% and it is mainly bound to albumin. The elimination half-life of ketanserin is 10 to 29 hours. However, a more recent study found a half-life of 3.5 hours.

== Chemistry ==
Ketanserin is a piperidinylethylquinazoline derivative.

=== Synthesis ===
Thieme Patents: Sino: Revised: Analogues

Either 3-(2-Chloroethyl)quinazoline-2,4(1H,3H)-dione [5081-87-8] (1a), or alternatively 2,3-dihydro-[1,3]oxazolo[2,3-b]quinazolin-5-one [52727-44-3] (1b) can be used as starting material. Attachment of the sidechain to 4-(4-Fluorobenzoyl)piperidine [56346-57-7] (2) completes the synthesis of Ketanserin (3).

=== Analogues ===
Analogues of ketanserin include altanserin, ocaperidone, paliperidone, pelanserin, pirenperone, risperidone, ritanserin, and setoperone, among others.

RH-34 and EZS-8 are analogues of ketanserin with serotonin 5-HT_{2A} receptor agonism and/or serotonergic psychedelic activity.

== History ==
Ketanserin was first described in the scientific literature by 1980.

== Society and culture ==
=== Names ===
Ketanserin is the generic name of the drug and its INN, USAN, and BAN. It is also known by its major brand names Sufrexal and Serefrex and by its former developmental code names R-41468, KJK-945, and R-49945.

== See also ==
- Serotonin 5-HT_{2A} receptor antagonist
- List of investigational hallucinogens and entactogens
- Eplivanserin/volinanserin
