= Dihydroergotamine =

Chemical used to treat migraines

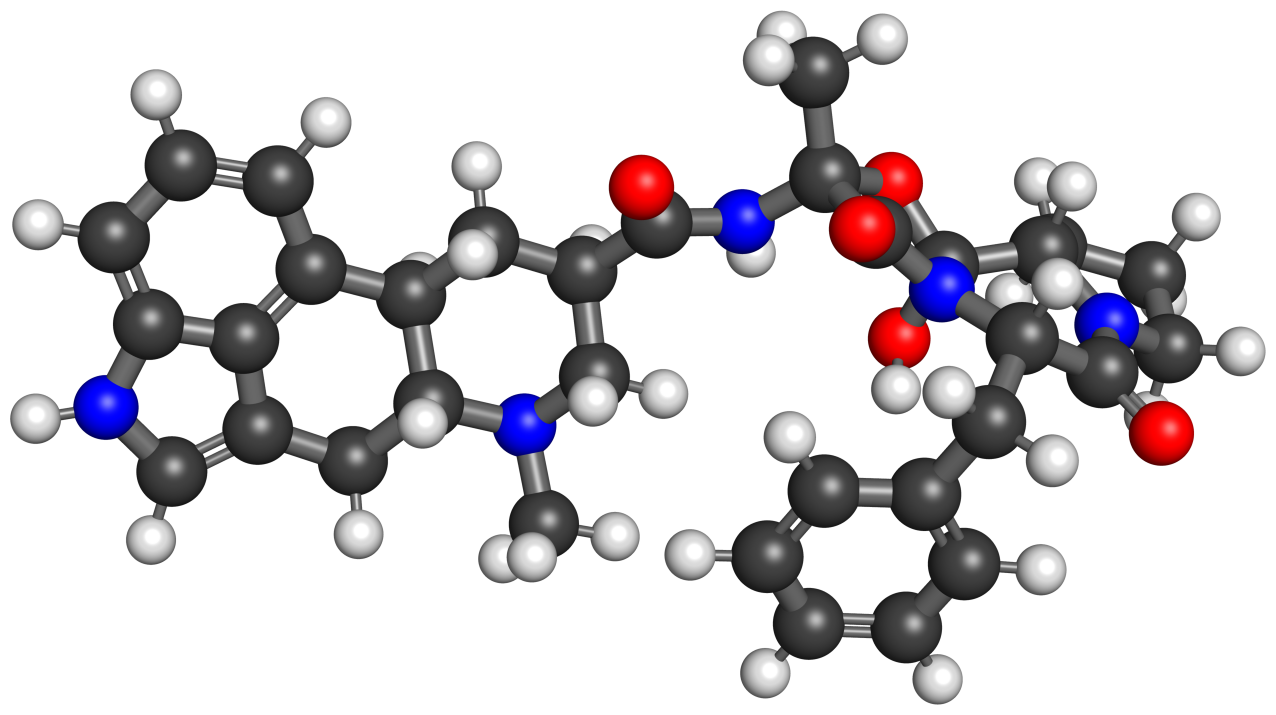

Clinical data
- Pronunciation: /daɪˌhaɪdroʊ.ɜːrˈɡɒtəmiːn/ dy-HY-droh-ur-GOT-ə-meen
- Trade names: D.H.E. 45, others
- Other names: DHE; (5'α)-9,10-Dihydro-12'-hydroxy-2'-methyl-5'-(phenylmethyl)-ergotaman-3',6',18-trione
- AHFS/Drugs.com: Monograph
- MedlinePlus: a603022
- License data: US DailyMed: Dihydroergotamine
- Routes of administration: Nasal, subcutaneous, intramuscular, intravenous
- ATC code: N02CA01 (WHO)

Legal status
- Legal status: BR: Class D1 (Drug precursors); US: ℞-only

Pharmacokinetic data
- Bioavailability: 32% (nasal spray)
- Elimination half-life: 9 hours
- Excretion: Bile duct

Identifiers
- IUPAC name: (2R,4R,7R)-N-[(1S,2S,4R,7S)-7-benzyl-2-hydroxy-4-methyl-5,8-dioxo-3-oxa-6,9-diazatricyclo[7.3.0.0^{2,6}]dodecan-4-yl]-6-methyl-6,11-diazatetracyclo[7.6.1.0^{2,7}.0^{12,16}]hexadeca-1(16),9,12,14-tetraene-4-carboxamide
- CAS Number: 511-12-6; mesylate: 6190-39-2
- PubChem CID: 10531
- IUPHAR/BPS: 121
- DrugBank: DB00320; mesylate: DBSALT000997
- ChemSpider: 10091; mesylate: 64311
- UNII: 436O5HM03C; mesylate: 81AXN7R2QT
- KEGG: D07837; mesylate: D02211
- ChEBI: CHEBI:4562; mesylate: CHEBI:59756
- ChEMBL: ChEMBL1732; mesylate: ChEMBL1200517
- CompTox Dashboard (EPA): DTXSID6045614
- ECHA InfoCard: 100.007.386

Chemical and physical data
- Formula: C_{33}H_{37}N_{5}O_{5}
- Molar mass: 583.689 g·mol^{−1}
- 3D model (JSmol): Interactive image
- SMILES: [H][C@]56C[C@@H](C(=O)N[C@]1(C)O[C@]4(O)N(C1=O)[C@@H](Cc2ccccc2)C(=O)N3CCC[C@]34[H])CN(C)[C@]5([H])Cc7c[nH]c8cccc6c78
- InChI: InChI=1S/C33H37N5O5/c1-32(35-29(39)21-15-23-22-10-6-11-24-28(22)20(17-34-24)16-25(23)36(2)18-21)31(41)38-26(14-19-8-4-3-5-9-19)30(40)37-13-7-12-27(37)33(38,42)43-32/h3-6,8-11,17,21,23,25-27,34,42H,7,12-16,18H2,1-2H3,(H,35,39)/t21-,23-,25-,26+,27+,32-,33+/m1/s1; Key:LUZRJRNZXALNLM-JGRZULCMSA-N

Dihydroergotamine (DHE), sold under the brand names D.H.E. 45 and Migranal among others, is an ergot alkaloid used to treat migraines. It is a derivative of ergotamine. It is administered as a nasal spray or injection and has an efficacy similar to that of sumatriptan. Nausea is a common side effect.

It has similar actions to the triptans, acting as an agonist to the serotonin receptors and causing vasoconstriction of the intracranial blood vessels, but also interacts centrally with dopamine and adrenergic receptors. It can be used to treat acute intractable headache or withdrawal from analgesics.

== Medical uses ==
Subcutaneous and intramuscular injections are generally more effective than the nasal spray and can be self-administered by patients. Intravenous injection is considered very effective for severe migraine or status migrainosus. Dihydroergotamine is also used in the treatment of medication overuse headache.

Dihydroergotamine is indicated for the acute treatment of migraine.

== Contraindications ==
Dihydroergotamine is contraindicated with potent CYP3A4 inhibitors, like macrolide antibiotics.

Contraindications for dihydroergotamine include: pregnancy, kidney failure or liver failure, coronary, cerebral, and peripheral vascular disease, hypersensitivity reactions, sepsis, and uncontrolled hypertension.

== Side effects ==
Nausea is a common side effect of intravenous administration and less common in other modes. Antiemetics can be given prior to DHE to counteract the nausea. Risks and contraindications are similar to the triptans. DHE and triptans should never be taken within 24 hours of each other due to the potential for coronary artery vasospasm. DHE produces no dependence.

== Pharmacology ==
=== Pharmacodynamics ===
Dihydroergotamine's antimigraine activity is due to its action as an agonist at the serotonin 5-HT_{1B}, 5-HT_{1D}, and 5-HT_{1F} receptors. It also interacts with other serotonin, adrenergic, and dopamine receptors.

Dihydroergotamine is an agonist of the serotonin 5-HT_{2B} receptor and has been associated with cardiac valvulopathy.

In spite of acting as an agonist of the serotonin 5-HT_{2A} receptor, dihydroergotamine has been described as non-hallucinogenic. This is also the case with certain other ergoline derivatives, such as bromocriptine and pergolide.

Activities of dihydroergotamine at various sites
Site	Affinity (K_{i}/IC_{50} [nM])	Efficacy (E_{max} [%])	Action
5-HT_{1A}	0.4–1.5	100%	Agonist
5-HT_{1B}	0.006–18	?	Agonist
5-HT_{1D}	0.13–0.5	?	Agonist
5-HT_{1E}	1,100	?	?
5-HT_{1F}	180	?	Agonist
5-HT_{2A}	9.0	?	Agonist
5-HT_{2B}	15–33	?	Agonist
5-HT_{2C}	1.3	?	Agonist
5-HT_{3}	>3,700–>10,000	?	?
5-HT_{4}	60	?	?
5-HT_{5A}	?	?	?
5-HT_{5B}	?	?	?
5-HT_{6}	5.4	?	?
5-HT_{7}	9.1–9.2	?	?
α_{1A}	6.6	?	?
α_{1B}	8.3	?	?
α_{1D}	?	?	?
α_{2A}	1.9	?	?
α_{2B}	3.3	?	?
α_{2C}	1.4	?	?
β_{1}	3,100	?	?
β_{2}	2,700	?	?
β_{3}	271	?	?
D_{1}	2,779	?	?
D_{2}	1.2–5.0	?	Agonist
D_{3}	6.4–16	?	?
D_{4}	8.7	?	?
D_{5}	?	?	?
H_{1}	?	?	?
mACh	?	?	?
Notes: All receptors are human except 5-HT_{3} (rat/mouse), 5-HT_{4} (guinea pig), 5-HT_{5B} (rat—no human counterpart), α_{1A}-adrenergic (rat/human), and α_{2A}-adrenergic (rat/human).

=== Pharmacokinetics ===
Efficacy is variable in the nasal spray form with relative bioavailability of 32% compared to injection.

== History ==
Dihydroergotamine was synthesized by Albert Hofmann and Werner Stoll at Sandoz in 1943. It was first described in the scientific literature that same year. Dihydroergotamine was first approved for medical use under the brand name D.H.E. 45 in 1946. Dihydroergotamine is derived from ergot, a fungus that grows on rye and other grains.

== Society and culture ==
=== Legal status ===
In 2013, the Committee for Medicinal Products for Human Use of the European Medicines Agency recommended that medicines containing ergot derivatives no longer be used to treat several conditions involving problems with memory, sensation or blood circulation, or to prevent migraine headaches because the risks (increased risk of fibrosis and ergotism) were said to be greater than the benefits in these indications.

=== Brand names ===
Brand names of dihydroergotamine include Diergo, Dihydergot, D.H.E. 45, Ergont, Ikaran, Migranal, Orstanorm, and Seglor, among others.
