= Zolmitriptan =

Medication used in treatment of migraines

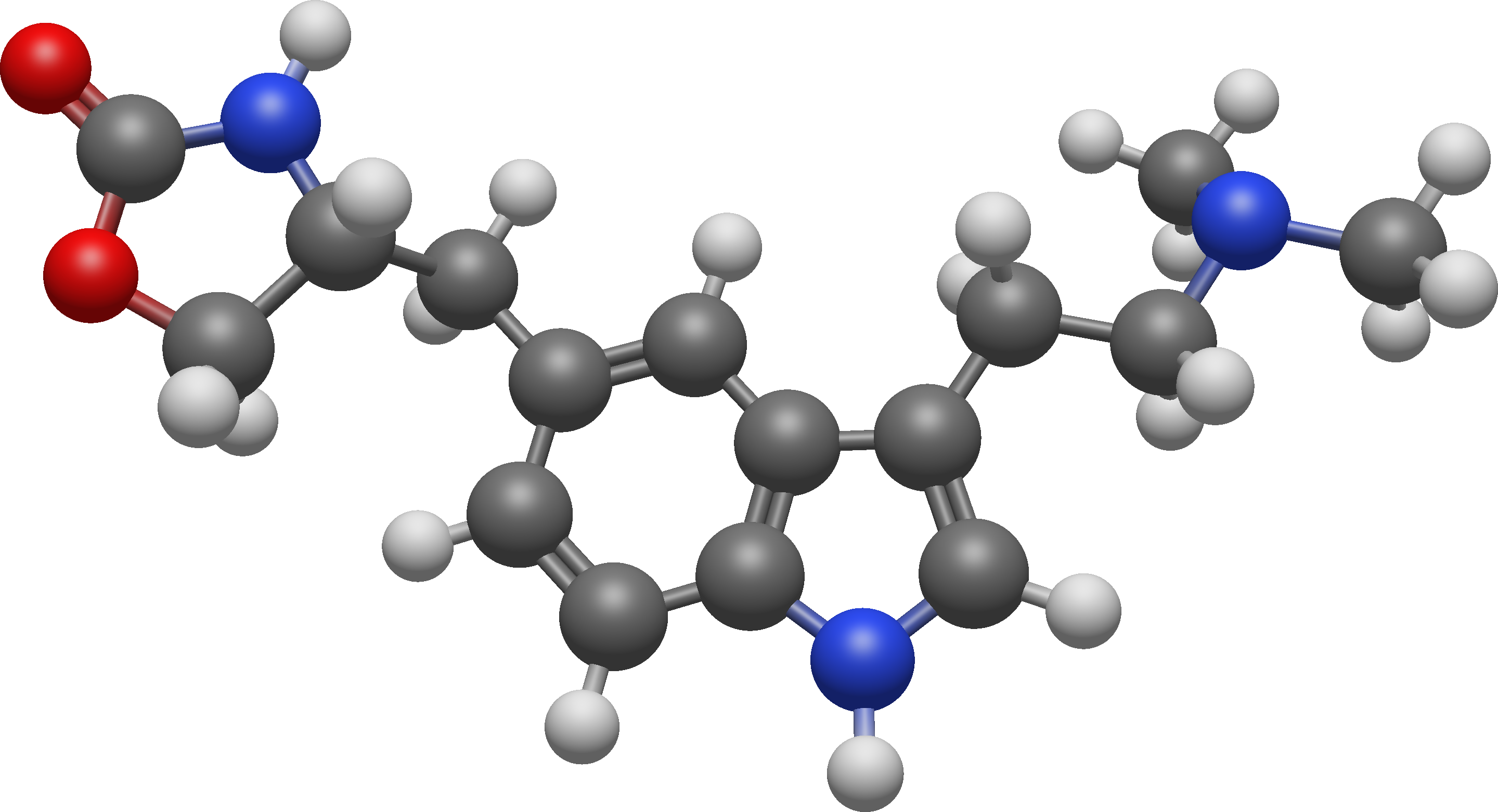

Clinical data
- Trade names: Zomig, others
- Other names: BW-311C90; BW311C90; 311C90; BW-311-C-90; ML-004; ML004; [(4S)-2-Oxo-1,3-oxazolidin-4-yl]methyl-N,N-dimethyltryptamine; [(4S)-2-Oxo-1,3-oxazolidin-4-yl]methyl-DMT
- AHFS/Drugs.com: Monograph
- MedlinePlus: a601129
- License data: US DailyMed: Zolmitriptan
- Pregnancy category: AU: B3
- Routes of administration: By mouth, intranasal
- Drug class: Serotonin 5-HT_{1B}, 5-HT_{1D}, 5-HT_{1E}, and 5-HT_{1F} receptor agonist; Antimigraine agent; Triptan
- ATC code: N02CC03 (WHO)

Legal status
- Legal status: AU: S4 (Prescription only) / S3; CA: ℞-only; US: ℞-only

Pharmacokinetic data
- Bioavailability: Oral: 40%
- Protein binding: 25%
- Metabolism: Liver (CYP1A2-mediated, to active metabolite; also MAO-A)
- Metabolites: • N-Desmethylzolmitriptan • Zolmitriptan N-oxide • Indole acetic acid derivative
- Elimination half-life: Zolmitriptan: 3 hours N-Desmethylzolmitriptan: 3.5 hours
- Excretion: Urine: ~65% Feces: ~30%

Identifiers
- IUPAC name: (S)-4-({3-[2-(Dimethylamino)ethyl]-1H-indol-5-yl}methyl)-1,3-oxazolidin-2-one
- CAS Number: 139264-17-8
- PubChem CID: 60857
- IUPHAR/BPS: 60
- DrugBank: DB00315
- ChemSpider: 54844
- UNII: 2FS66TH3YW
- KEGG: D00415
- ChEBI: CHEBI:10124
- ChEMBL: ChEMBL1185
- CompTox Dashboard (EPA): DTXSID8045933
- ECHA InfoCard: 100.158.186

Chemical and physical data
- Formula: C_{16}H_{21}N_{3}O_{2}
- Molar mass: 287.363 g·mol^{−1}
- 3D model (JSmol): Interactive image
- SMILES: O=C1OC[C@@H](N1)Cc2ccc3c(c2)c(c[nH]3)CCN(C)C
- InChI: InChI=1S/C16H21N3O2/c1-19(2)6-5-12-9-17-15-4-3-11(8-14(12)15)7-13-10-21-16(20)18-13/h3-4,8-9,13,17H,5-7,10H2,1-2H3,(H,18,20)/t13-/m0/s1; Key:ULSDMUVEXKOYBU-ZDUSSCGKSA-N

Zolmitriptan, sold under the brand name Zomig among others, is a serotonergic medication which is used in the acute treatment of migraine attacks with or without aura and cluster headaches. It is taken by mouth as a swallowed or disintegrating tablet or as a nasal spray.

Side effects include tightness in the neck or throat, jaw pain, dizziness, paresthesia, asthenia, somnolence, warm/cold sensations, nausea, chest pressure, and dry mouth. The drug acts as a selective serotonin 5-HT_{1B} and 5-HT_{1D} receptor agonist. Structurally, it is a triptan and a tryptamine derivative.

It was patented in 1990 and was approved for medical use in 1997.

== Medical uses ==
=== Migraine ===
Zolmitriptan is used for the acute treatment of migraines with or without aura in adults. It is not intended for the prophylactic therapy of migraine or for use in the management of hemiplegic or basilar migraine.

=== Off-label uses ===
- Acute treatment of cluster headaches—Level A recommendation from the American Academy of Neurology
- Acute treatment of menstrual migraine

=== Available forms ===
Zolmitriptan is available as a swallowed tablet, an orally disintegrating tablet, and as a nasal spray, in doses of 2.5 and 5 mg. People who get migraines from aspartame should not use the disintegrating tablet (Zomig ZMT) as it contains aspartame.

A 2014 Cochrane review has shown that zolmitriptan 5 mg nasal spray was significantly more effective than the 5 mg oral tablet.

== Contraindications ==
Zolmitriptan is contraindicated in patients with cerebrovascular or cardiovascular disease because serotonin 5-HT_{1B} receptors are present in coronary arteries. Such conditions include, but are not limited to, coronary artery disease, stroke, and peripheral vascular disease. It is also contraindicated in hemiplegic migraine.

== Side effects ==
Side effects include neck/throat/jaw pain/tightness/pressure, dizziness, paresthesia, asthenia, somnolence, warm/cold sensations, nausea, heaviness sensation, and dry mouth.

As for cardiovascular side effects, zolmitriptan can increase systolic blood pressure in the elderly and increase diastolic blood pressure in both the elderly and young people. Additionally, there is the side effect of a dose-related increase in sedation. There is a risk for medication withdrawal headache or medication overuse headache.

Zolmitriptan has a weak affinity for serotonin 5-HT_{1A} receptors; these receptors have been implicated in the development of serotonin syndrome.

== Overdose ==
There is limited experience with overdose of zolmitriptan and there is no specific antidote for zolmitriptan overdose. A dose of zolmitriptan of 50 mg, which is 10- to 40-fold the clinically used dose range of 1.25 to 5 mg, commonly resulted in sedation in patients in a clinical study. Zolmitriptan has a relatively short elimination half-life of 3 hours, and so symptoms of overdose may be expected to resolve within around 15 hours post-intake.

== Interactions ==
Following administration of the non-selective cytochrome P450 inhibitor cimetidine, the elimination half-life and total exposure of zolmitriptan and its active metabolite were approximately doubled. The major metabolite of zolmitriptan, N-desmethylzolmitriptan (183C91), which is active and has several-fold greater affinity for the serotonin 5-HT_{1B} and 5-HT_{1D} receptors than zolmitriptan, is metabolized into an inactive form by monoamine oxidase A (MAO-A). The reversible inhibitor of MAO-A (RIMA) moclobemide combined with zolmitriptan has been found to increase N-desmethylzolmitriptan exposure and peak levels by 1.5- to 3-fold.

== Pharmacology ==
=== Pharmacodynamics ===
Zolmitriptan activities
Target	Affinity (K_{i}, nM)
5-HT_{1A}	16–316 (K_{i}); 3,020–>10,000 (EC_{50}); 55% (E_{max})
5-HT_{1B}	0.47–20 (K_{i}); 3.8–60 (EC_{50}); 99–102% (E_{max})
5-HT_{1D}	0.11–4 (K_{i}); 0.29–1.6 (EC_{50}); 86–106% (E_{max})
5-HT_{1E}	10–>10,000 (K_{i}); 6.6–62 (EC_{50}); 101% (E_{max})
5-HT_{1F}	28–617 (K_{i}); 10–420 (EC_{50}); 97% (E_{max})
5-HT_{2A}	>10,000 (K_{i}) >10,000 (EC_{50})
5-HT_{2B}	65–>10,000 (K_{i}) >10,000 (EC_{50})
5-HT_{2C}	79,400 (K_{i}) (guinea pig); ND (EC_{50})
5-HT_{3}	>3,160 (mouse)
5-HT_{4}	>3,160 (guinea pig)
5-HT_{5A}	398 (rat)
5-HT_{6}	>3,160
5-HT_{7}	87–96 (K_{i}); 525 (EC_{50})
α_{1A}–α_{1D}	ND
α_{2}	79,000
α_{2A}–α_{2C}	ND
β_{1}–β_{3}	ND
D_{1}, D_{2}	>100,000
D_{3}–D_{5}	ND
H_{1}–H_{4}	ND
M_{1}–M_{5}	ND
I_{1}, I_{2}	ND
σ_{1}, σ_{2}	ND
TAAR1	ND
SERT	ND
NET	ND
DAT	ND
Notes: The smaller the value, the more avidly the drug binds to the site. All proteins are human unless otherwise specified. Refs:

Zolmitriptan is a selective serotonin 5-HT_{1B} and 5-HT_{1D} receptor agonist with weak affinity for the serotonin 5-HT_{1A} receptor. It also has affinity for other serotonin receptors, including the serotonin 5-HT_{1E}, 5-HT_{1F}, 5-HT_{2B}, 5-HT_{5A}, and 5-HT_{7} receptors. Conversely, its affinities for the serotonin 5-HT_{2A}, 5-HT_{2C}, 5-HT_{3}, 5-HT_{4}, and 5-HT_{6} receptors are negligible or undetectable. It is likewise inactive as a serotonin 5-HT_{2A} receptor agonist.

Zolmitriptan's major metabolite, N-desmethylzolmitriptan (183C91), is also active and has about 2- to 6-fold the affinity of zolmitriptan for the serotonin 5-HT_{1B} and 5-HT_{1D} receptors.

Its action on serotonin 5-HT_{1B} and 5-HT_{1D} receptors causes vasoconstriction in intracranial blood vessels; as well it can inhibit the release of pro-inflammatory neuropeptides from trigeminal perivascular nerve endings. It crosses the blood–brain barrier as evidenced by the presence of radiolabeled zolmitriptan within the cells of the trigeminal nucleus caudalis and nucleus tractus solitarii.

=== Pharmacokinetics ===
==== Absorption ====
Zolmitriptan has a rapid onset of action and has been detected in the brain as early as within 5 minutes of intranasal administration. On average, zolmitriptan has an oral bioavailability of 40%, a mean volume of distribution of 8.3 L/kg after oral administration, and 2.4 L/kg after intravenous administration. According to a study of healthy volunteers, food intake seems to have no significant effect on the effectiveness of zolmitriptan in both men and women.

==== Distribution ====
Zolmitriptan is a more lipophilic compound with greater central permeability than certain other triptans like sumatriptan. It has been found to cross the blood–brain barrier and enter the central nervous system both in animals and humans. In a clinical pharmacokinetic study, brain concentrations were about 20% of plasma concentrations. However, in another clinical study, the drug achieved relatively low occupancy of central serotonin 5-HT_{1B} receptors (4–5%) as measured by positron emission tomography (PET) imaging.

==== Metabolism ====
Zolmitriptan is metabolized into three major metabolites by the human hepatic cytochrome P450 enzymes—primarily CYP1A2. Two-thirds of the parent compound breaks down into the active metabolite N-desmethylzolmitriptan (183C91), while the remaining one-third separates into the other two inactive metabolites: zolmitriptan N-oxide and an indole acetic acid derivative. N-Desmethylzolmitriptan circulates at higher levels than those of zolmitriptan. This metabolite is deaminated by monoamine oxidase A (MAO-A).

==== Elimination ====
Zolmitriptan has an elimination half-life of about 3 hours before it undergoes renal elimination; its clearance is greater than the glomerular filtration rate suggesting that there is some renal tubular secretion of the compound.

== Chemistry ==
Zolmitriptan, also known as [(4S)-2-oxo-1,3-oxazolidin-4-yl]methyl-N,N-dimethyltryptamine, is a tryptamine derivative and a 5-substituted derivative of the psychedelic drug dimethyltryptamine (DMT). It is specifically the derivative of DMT in which the hydrogen atom at position 5 of the indole ring has been substituted with a [(4S)-2-oxo-1,3-oxazolidin-4-yl]methyl group.

The experimental log P of zolmitriptan is 1.6 to 1.8. For comparison, the experimental log P of sumatriptan is 0.8 to 0.93. Zolmitriptan is much more lipophilic than sumatriptan.

Analogues of zolmitriptan include other triptans like sumatriptan, naratriptan, rizatriptan, eletriptan, almotriptan, and frovatriptan.

== History ==
Zolmitriptan was patented in 1990 and was first described in the scientific literature by 1994. It was first introduced for medical use in the United States in 1997.

== Society and culture ==
=== Brand names ===
Zolmitriptan is marketed by AstraZeneca with the brand names Zomig, Zomigon (Argentina, Canada, and Greece), AscoTop (Germany) and Zomigoro (France).

=== Economics ===
In 2008, Zomig generated nearly $154 million in sales.

AstraZeneca's U.S. patent on Zomig tablets expired on November 14, 2012, and its pediatric exclusivity extension expired on May 14, 2013. The patent in certain European countries has already expired too, and generic drug maker Actavis released a generic version in those countries, starting in March 2012.

=== Legal status ===
In Russia, versions of zolmitriptan which are not registered in the National registry of medications may be regarded as narcotic drugs (derivatives of dimethyltryptamine (DMT)).

== Research ==
=== Obsessive–compulsive disorder ===
Zolmitriptan showed no effect on obsessive–compulsive disorder (OCD) symptoms nor on mood or anxiety in a clinical study.

=== Social deficits and aggression ===
Zolmitriptan, in a modified-release formulation with code name ML-004 (or ML004), is under development by MapLight Therapeutics for the treatment of pervasive developmental disorders (e.g., autism), agitation, and aggression. The drug has been found to reduce aggression in rodents and has also been reported to decrease aggression in humans. As of June 2023, zolmitriptan is in phase 2 clinical trials for pervasive developmental disorders, phase 1 clinical trials for agitation, and is in the preclinical stage of development for aggression. Results from a phase 2 trial were released in June 2026, with the drug failing to improve social communication but meaningfully improving irritability.

== See also ==
- Buspirone/zolmitriptan
