= Almotriptan =

Chemical compound

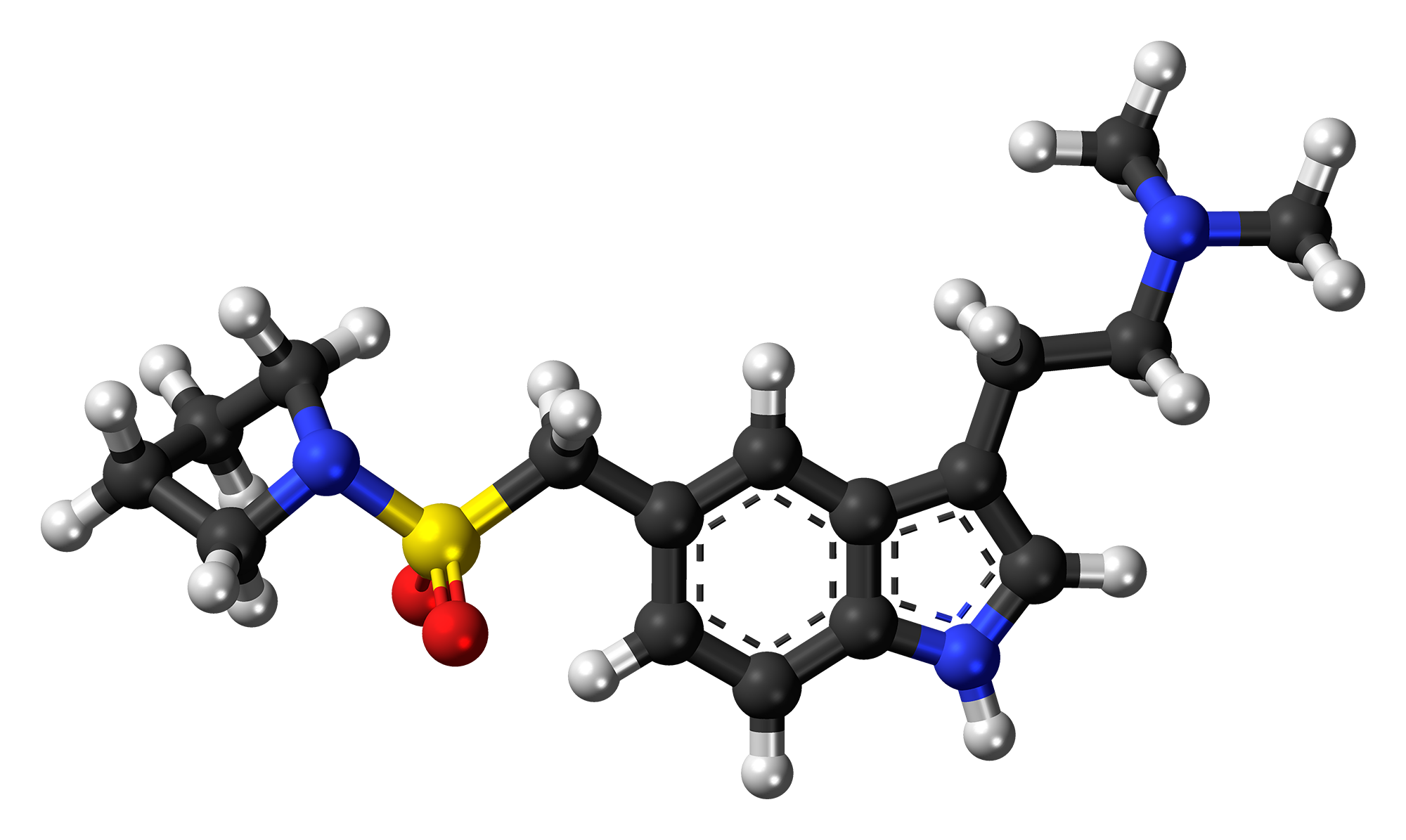

Clinical data
- Trade names: Axert, Almogran
- Other names: LAS-31416; LAS31416
- AHFS/Drugs.com: Monograph
- MedlinePlus: a603028
- License data: US DailyMed: Almotriptan
- Routes of administration: By mouth
- Drug class: Serotonin 5-HT_{1B}, 5-HT_{1D}, and 5-HT_{1F} receptor agonist; Triptan; Antimigraine agent
- ATC code: N02CC05 (WHO)

Legal status
- Legal status: UK: POM (Prescription only); US: ℞-only; EU: Rx-only; In general: ℞ (Prescription only)

Pharmacokinetic data
- Bioavailability: 70%
- Protein binding: 35%
- Metabolism: Liver
- Elimination half-life: 3–4 hours

Identifiers
- IUPAC name: N,N-dimethyl-2- [5-(pyrrolidin-1-ylsulfonylmethyl)- 1H-indol-3-yl]-ethanamine
- CAS Number: 154323-57-6
- PubChem CID: 123606
- IUPHAR/BPS: 7110
- DrugBank: DB00918
- ChemSpider: 110198
- UNII: 1O4XL5SN61
- KEGG: D02824; as salt: D02825
- ChEBI: CHEBI:520985
- ChEMBL: ChEMBL1505
- CompTox Dashboard (EPA): DTXSID5044289

Chemical and physical data
- Formula: C_{17}H_{25}N_{3}O_{2}S
- Molar mass: 335.47 g·mol^{−1}
- 3D model (JSmol): Interactive image
- SMILES: CN(C)CCc2c[nH]c3ccc(CS(=O)(=O)N1CCCC1)cc23
- InChI: InChI=1S/C17H25N3O2S/c1-19(2)10-7-15-12-18-17-6-5-14(11-16(15)17)13-23(21,22)20-8-3-4-9-20/h5-6,11-12,18H,3-4,7-10,13H2,1-2H3; Key:WKEMJKQOLOHJLZ-UHFFFAOYSA-N

Almotriptan, sold under the brand names Axert and Almogran among others, is a triptan medication used in the treatment of heavy migraine headache.

Almotriptan was patented in 1992 and approved for medical use in 2000. It was discovered and developed by Almirall-Prodesfarma.

== Medical uses ==
Almotriptan is prescribed to treat the acute headache phase of migraine attacks with or without aura. Almotriptan is approved in the US for the treatment of migraine in adolescents from 12 to 17 years of age.

=== Effectiveness ===
The efficacy and tolerability of almotriptan has been studied in numerous randomized, controlled trials totaling more than 4,800 adults with either moderate or severe attacks of migraine. Its efficacy is significantly more effective than placebo and alleviates nausea, photophobia and phonophobia linked to migraine attacks. Almotriptan has similar efficacy as a standard dose of sumatriptan, another triptan drug, and fewer adverse effects.

== Contraindications ==
As with other triptans, almotriptan should not be used in patients with a history, symptoms or signs of ischaemic heart disease (myocardial infarction, angina pectoris, documented silent ischaemia, Prinzmetal's angina) or severe hypertension and uncontrolled mild or moderate hypertension. Other contraindications are previous cerebrovascular accident (CVA) or transient ischaemic attack (TIA), peripheral vascular disease, severe hepatic impairment, concomitant administration of ergotamine, ergotamine derivatives (including methysergide) and other 5-HT1_{B/D} agonists.

== Side effects ==
Almotriptan has proved to have an adverse effects profile similar to placebo when used following the Summary of Product Characteristics instructions (see references).

== Interactions ==
Almotriptan is metabolized mainly by monoamine oxidase A (MAO-A) and to lesser extent by CYP3A4 and CYP2D6. Studies of drugs used as preventive against migraine (propranolol and verapamil), antidepressants (moclobemide and fluoxetine) yielded results that showed significant altering of the pharmacokinetics of almotriptan though they were deemed not clinically relevant.

== Pharmacology ==
=== Mechanism of action ===
Almotriptan activities
| Target | Affinity (K_{i}, nM) |
|---|---|
| 5-HT_{1A} | 186–850 (K_{i}); 3,310–>10,000 (EC_{50}) |
| 5-HT_{1B} | 3.5–63 (K_{i}); 14–100 (EC_{50}) |
| 5-HT_{1D} | 5.5–16 (K_{i}); 18–20 (EC_{50}) |
| 5-HT_{1E} | >10,000 (K_{i}) >10,000 (EC_{50}) |
| 5-HT_{1F} | 23 (K_{i}); 16–126 (EC_{50}) |
| 5-HT_{2A} | >10,000 (K_{i}) >10,000 (EC_{50}) |
| 5-HT_{2B} | >10,000 (K_{i}); 6,310 (EC_{50}) |
| 5-HT_{2C} | ND (K_{i}); ND (EC_{50}) |
| 5-HT_{3} | ND |
| 5-HT_{4} | ND |
| 5-HT_{5A} | ND |
| 5-HT_{6} | ND |
| 5-HT_{7} | 347 (K_{i}) >10,000 (EC_{50}) |
| α | >1,000 |
| α_{1A}–α_{1D} | ND |
| α_{2A}–α_{2C} | ND |
| β | >1,000 |
| β_{1}–β_{3} | ND |
| D_{1}, D_{2} | >1,000 |
| D_{3}–D_{5} | ND |
| H_{1} | ND |
| H_{2} | >1,000 |
| H_{3}, H_{4} | ND |
| M_{1}–M_{5} | ND |
| I_{1}, I_{2} | ND |
| σ_{1}, σ_{2} | ND |
| TAAR1 | ND |
| SERT | ND |
| NET | ND |
| DAT | ND |
Notes: The smaller the value, the more avidly the drug binds to the site. All proteins are human unless otherwise specified. Refs:

Like all triptans, almotriptan has a high and specific affinity for serotonin 5-HT_{1B/1D} receptors. Binding of the drug to the receptor leads to vasoconstriction of the cranial (brain) blood vessels and thus affects the redistribution of blood flow. Almotriptan significantly increases cerebral blood flow and reduces blood flow through extracerebral cranial vessels. Even though it affects cranial blood vessels a single standard dose of almotriptan has no clinically significant effect on blood pressure or heart rate in both young and elderly healthy volunteers. Larger doses seem to slightly increase blood pressure but not beyond clinical relevance.

=== Pharmacokinetics ===
Almotriptan has linear pharmacokinetics up to the 16-fold standard dose. Its biological half-life is 3 hours, and its bioavailability 70%.

C_{max} is observed 1.5–4 hours after oral administration, and approximately 50% of the drug is excreted unchanged in the urine. Metabolism is mediated through the enzymes MAO-A and CYP3A4 and CYP2D6 oxidation.

Almotriptan clearance is moderately reduced in the elderly but does not require dose adjustment. Sex does not alter the pharmacokinetics of the drug. People with moderate-to-severe renal dysfunction are recommended to use only half the dose.

== Chemistry ==
Almotriptan is a tryptamine derivative and a 5-substituted derivative of the psychedelic drug dimethyltryptamine (DMT).

Its experimental and predicted log P are both 1.6.

== History ==
Almotriptan was patented in 1992 and was approved for medical use in 2000.

== Society and culture ==
=== Brand names ===
Brand names include Axert (US, Canada), Almogran (Belgium, Denmark, Finland, France, Germany, Italy, Ireland Portugal, Spain, the United Kingdom, the Netherlands, Sweden, Switzerland, South Korea...), Almotrex (Italy), Almozen (Bulgaria and Poland), Dezamigren (Poland), and Amignul (Spain).
