= Rizatriptan =

Medication used for the treatment of migraine headaches

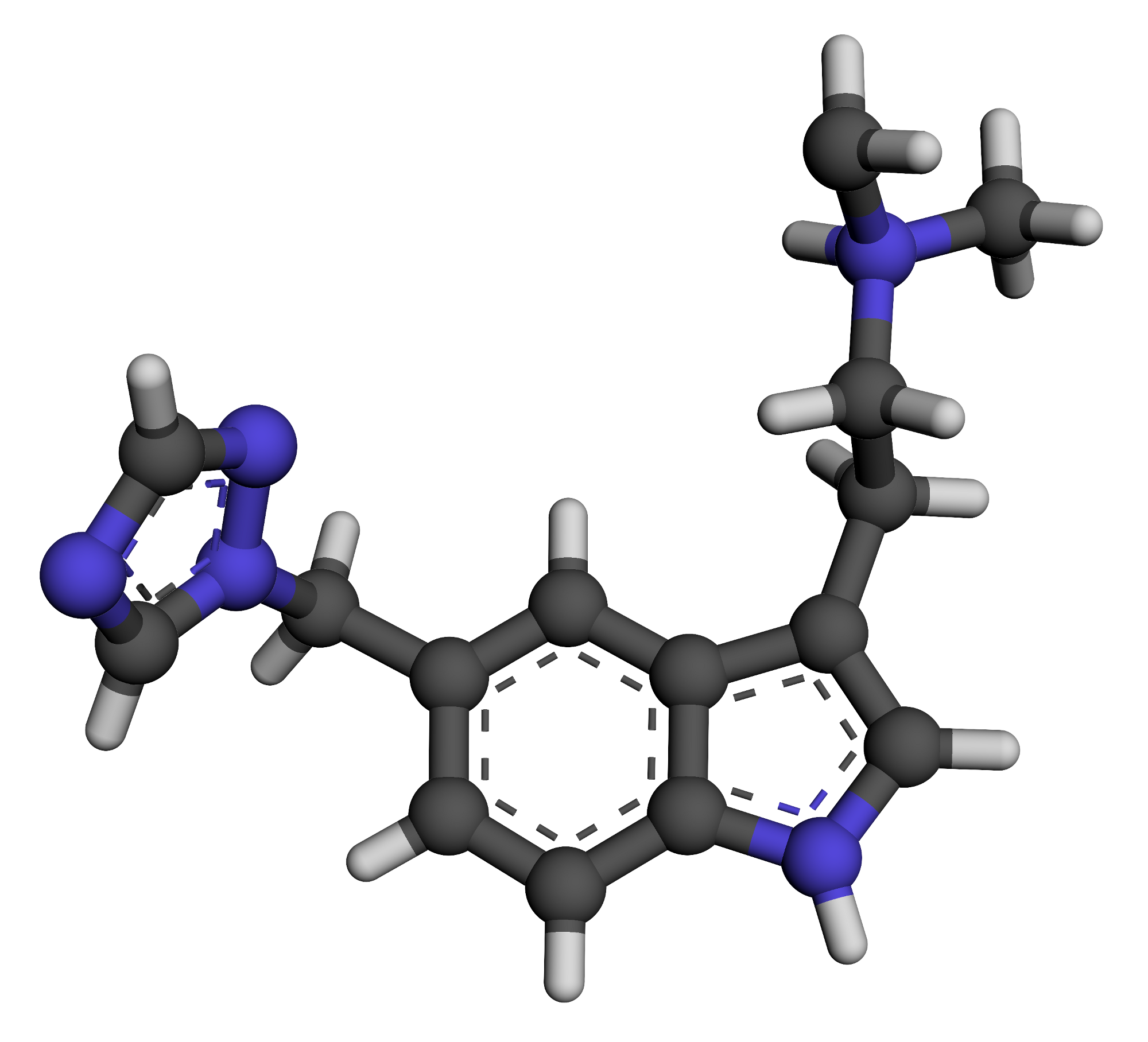

Clinical data
- Trade names: Maxalt, Maxalt-MLT, Rizafilm, others
- Other names: L-705126; L705126; MK-0462; MK0462; MK-462; MK462; 5-(1H-1,2,4-Triazol-1-ylmethyl)-N,N-dimethyltryptamine; 5-(1H-1,2,4-Triazol-1-ylmethyl)-DMT
- AHFS/Drugs.com: Monograph
- MedlinePlus: a601109
- License data: US DailyMed: Rizatriptan
- Pregnancy category: AU: B1
- Routes of administration: By mouth
- Drug class: Serotonin 5-HT_{1B}, 5-HT_{1D}, 5-HT_{1E}, and 5-HT_{1F} receptor agonist; Antimigraine agent; Triptan
- ATC code: N02CC04 (WHO)

Legal status
- Legal status: AU: S4 (Prescription only) / S3; CA: ℞-only; US: ℞-only; In general: ℞ (Prescription only)

Pharmacokinetic data
- Bioavailability: 45%
- Protein binding: 14%
- Metabolism: By monoamine oxidase
- Elimination half-life: 2–3 hours
- Excretion: 82% urine; 12% feces

Identifiers
- IUPAC name: N,N-dimethyl-2-[5-(1H-1,2,4-triazol-1-ylmethyl)-1H-indol-3-yl]ethanamine
- CAS Number: 145202-66-0
- PubChem CID: 5078
- IUPHAR/BPS: 51
- DrugBank: DB00953
- ChemSpider: 4900
- UNII: WR978S7QHH
- KEGG: D00675
- ChEBI: CHEBI:48273
- ChEMBL: ChEMBL905
- CompTox Dashboard (EPA): DTXSID2023565
- ECHA InfoCard: 100.243.719

Chemical and physical data
- Formula: C_{15}H_{19}N_{5}
- Molar mass: 269.352 g·mol^{−1}
- 3D model (JSmol): Interactive image
- SMILES: n1cncn1Cc2cc3c(cc2)[nH]cc3CCN(C)C
- InChI: InChI=1S/C15H19N5/c1-19(2)6-5-13-8-17-15-4-3-12(7-14(13)15)9-20-11-16-10-18-20/h3-4,7-8,10-11,17H,5-6,9H2,1-2H3; Key:ULFRLSNUDGIQQP-UHFFFAOYSA-N

Rizatriptan, sold under the brand name Maxalt among others, is a medication used for the treatment of migraine headaches. It is taken by mouth. It can also be applied on the tongue. It is a serotonin (5-HT) 1B/1D receptor agonist (triptan).

Common side effects include chest pain, dizziness, dry mouth, and tingling. Other side effects may include myocardial infarction, stroke, high blood pressure, serotonin syndrome, and anaphylaxis. Excessive use may result in medication overuse headaches. Use is not recommended during pregnancy and breastfeeding is not recommended within 24 hours after taking a dose. Rizatriptan is in the triptan class and is believed to work by activating the 5-HT_{1} receptor.

Rizatriptan was patented in 1991 and came into medical use in 1998. It is available as a generic medication. In 2023, it was the 208th most commonly prescribed medication in the United States, with more than 2 million prescriptions. Rizatriptan is available in combination with meloxicam as meloxicam/rizatriptan.

== Medical uses ==
Rizatriptan is indicated to treat acute migraine attacks with or without aura. It does not prevent future migraine attacks. A 2010 review found rizatriptan to be more efficacious and tolerable than sumatriptan.

== Contraindications ==
Rizatriptan and other triptans can cause vasoconstriction; they are contraindicated in people with cardiovascular conditions.

== Adverse effects ==
Frequent adverse effects (incidence less than 10%) are dizziness, drowsiness, asthenia/fatigue, and nausea. Clinical adverse experiences were typically mild and short-lasting (2–3 hours).

== Interactions ==
Rizatriptan has an important but complex interaction with a metabolite of the beta blocker propranolol. This interaction involves the enzyme monoamine oxidase A (MAO-A). Due to the interaction, the dose of rizatriptan should be reduced to 5 mg when it is combined with propranolol.

== Pharmacology ==
=== Mechanism of action ===
Rizatriptan activities
Target	Affinity (K_{i}, nM)
5-HT_{1A}	48–500 (K_{i}) >10,000 (EC_{50}); 40% (E_{max})
5-HT_{1B}	3–138 (K_{i}); 1.4–234 (EC_{50}); 74–99% (E_{max})
5-HT_{1D}	1.5–138 (K_{i}); 1.6–16 (EC_{50}); 83–105% (E_{max})
5-HT_{1E}	87–316 (K_{i}); 6.8–870 (EC_{50}); 107% (E_{max})
5-HT_{1F}	138–5,370 (K_{i}); 4.2–2,540 (EC_{50}); 93% (E_{max})
5-HT_{2A}	>10,000 (K_{i}) >10,000 (EC_{50})
5-HT_{2B}	257–3,090 (K_{i}); 3,240 (EC_{50})
5-HT_{2C}	>3,160 (K_{i}); ND (EC_{50})
5-HT_{3}	>3,160 (mouse)
5-HT_{4}	>3,160 (guinea pig)
5-HT_{5A}	5,500 (rat)
5-HT_{6}	>3,160
5-HT_{7}	1,860–>10,000 (K_{i}) >10,000 (EC_{50})
α_{1A}–α_{1D}	ND
α_{2A}–α_{2C}	ND
β_{1}–β_{3}	ND
D_{1}–D_{5}	ND
H_{1}–H_{4}	ND
M_{1}–M_{5}	ND
I_{1}, I_{2}	ND
σ_{1}, σ_{2}	ND
TAAR1	ND
SERT	ND
NET	ND
DAT	ND
Notes: The smaller the value, the more avidly the drug binds to the site. All proteins are human unless otherwise specified. Refs:

Rizatriptan acts as an agonist at serotonin 5-HT_{1B} and 5-HT_{1D} receptors. Like the other triptans sumatriptan and zolmitriptan, rizatriptan induces vasoconstriction—possibly by inhibiting the release of calcitonin gene-related peptide from sensory neurons in the trigeminal nerve.

== Chemistry ==
Rizatriptan, also known as 5-(1H-1,2,4-triazol-1-ylmethyl)-N,N-dimethyltryptamine, is a tryptamine derivative and a 5-substituted derivative of the psychedelic drug dimethyltryptamine (DMT).

The experimental log P of rizatriptan is 1.4 and its predicted log P is 1.67 to 1.77.

== History ==
Rizatriptan was patented in 1991 and was introduced for medical use in 1998.

== Society and culture ==
=== Brand names ===
Brand names include Rizalt, Rizalt RPD, Rizact (India), Rizafilm, Maxalt, and Maxalt-MLT.
