= Avitriptan =

Chemical compound

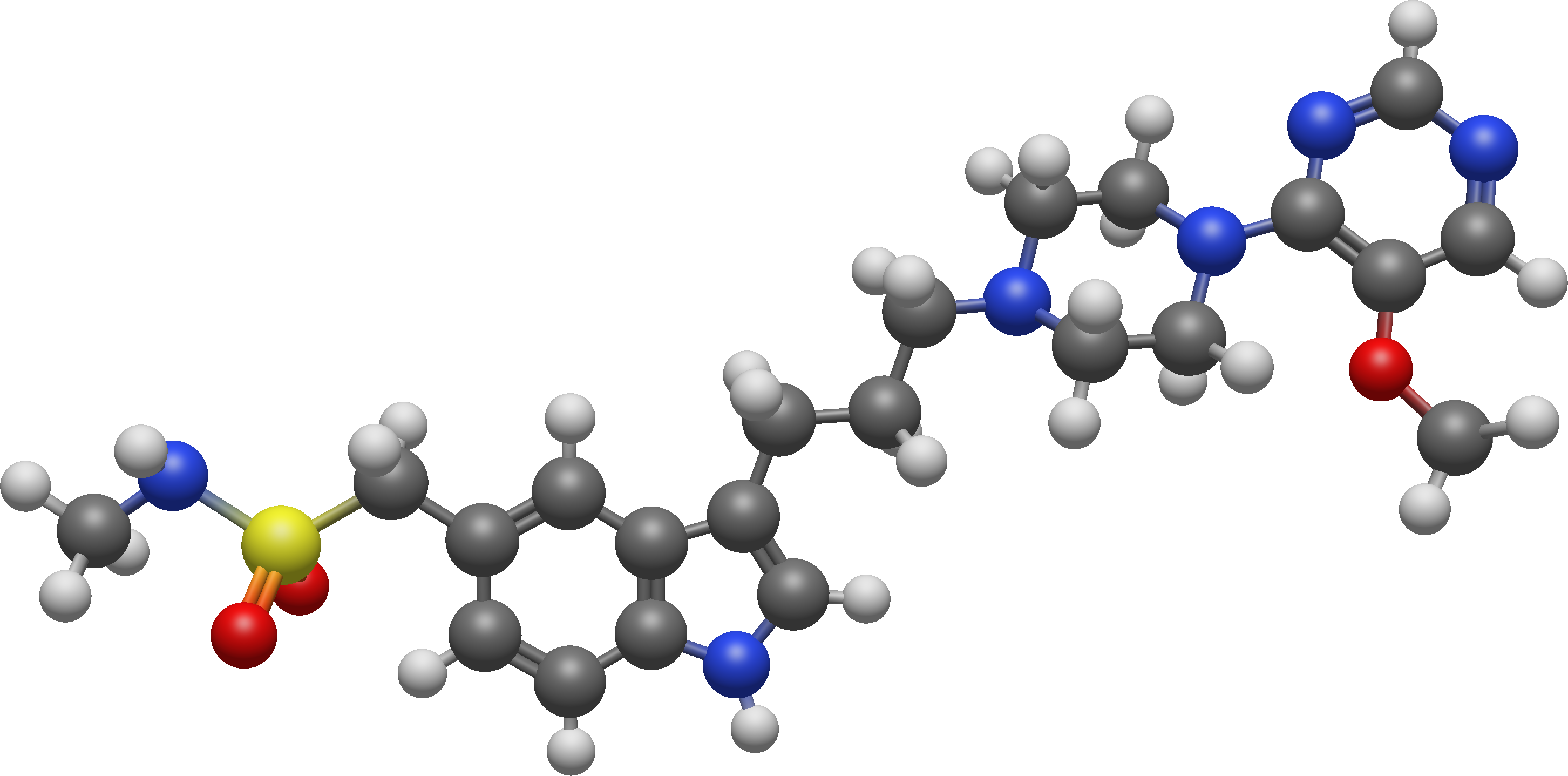

Clinical data
- Other names: BMS-180048; BMS-180,048; BMS180048
- Drug class: Serotonin 5-HT_{1B} and 5-HT_{1D} receptor agonist; Antimigraine agent; Triptan
- ATC code: None

Legal status
- Legal status: Never marketed

Identifiers
- IUPAC name: 1-[3-[3-[4-(5-methoxypyrimidin-4-yl)piperazin-1-yl]propyl]-1H-indol-5-yl]-N-methyl-methanesulfonamide
- CAS Number: 151140-96-4
- PubChem CID: 133081
- ChemSpider: 117442
- UNII: 6RS056L04P
- KEGG: D03014
- ChEMBL: ChEMBL2105880
- CompTox Dashboard (EPA): DTXSID60164718

Chemical and physical data
- Formula: C_{22}H_{30}N_{6}O_{3}S
- Molar mass: 458.58 g·mol^{−1}
- 3D model (JSmol): Interactive image
- SMILES: O=S(=O)(NC)Cc1ccc2c(c1)c(c[nH]2)CCCN4CCN(c3ncncc3OC)CC4
- InChI: InChI=1S/C22H30N6O3S/c1-23-32(29,30)15-17-5-6-20-19(12-17)18(13-25-20)4-3-7-27-8-10-28(11-9-27)22-21(31-2)14-24-16-26-22/h5-6,12-14,16,23,25H,3-4,7-11,15H2,1-2H3; Key:WRZVGHXUPBWIOO-UHFFFAOYSA-N

Avitriptan (INN; development code BMS-180048) is an antimigraine drug of the triptan family which was never marketed. It acts as a serotonin 5-HT_{1B} and 5-HT_{1D} receptor agonist. The drug reached phase 3 clinical trials prior to the discontinuation of its development.

== Pharmacology ==
Avitriptan activities
Target	Affinity (K_{i}, nM)
5-HT_{1A}	19 (K_{i}); 646–>10,000 (EC_{50})
5-HT_{1B}	1.6–21 (K_{i}); 2.1–2.7 (EC_{50})
5-HT_{1D}	0.78–4.4 (K_{i}); 0.54 (EC_{50})
5-HT_{1E}	3,550 (K_{i}); 3,020–>10,000 (EC_{50})
5-HT_{1F}	78–182 (K_{i}); 81–891 (EC_{50})
5-HT_{2A}	2,340 (K_{i}); 123 (EC_{50})
5-HT_{2B}	1,150 (K_{i}); 389 (EC_{50})
5-HT_{2C}	ND (K_{i}); ND (EC_{50})
5-HT_{3}	>1,000 (rat)
5-HT_{4}	ND
5-HT_{5A}	ND
5-HT_{6}	ND
5-HT_{7}	759 (K_{i}); 4,170 (EC_{50})
α_{1A}–α_{1D}	ND
α_{2A}–α_{2C}	ND
β_{1}–β_{3}	ND
D_{1}–D_{5}	ND
H_{1}–H_{4}	ND
M_{1}–M_{5}	ND
I_{1}, I_{2}	ND
σ_{1}, σ_{2}	ND
TAAR1	ND
SERT	ND
NET	ND
DAT	ND
Notes: The smaller the value, the more avidly the drug binds to the site. All proteins are human unless otherwise specified. Refs:

Avitriptan acts as a selective serotonin 5-HT_{1B} and 5-HT_{1D} receptor agonist. It is also notable in being a weak serotonin 5-HT_{2A} receptor agonist (EC_{50} = 123 nM), albeit with about two orders of magnitude lower activational potency than at the serotonin 5-HT_{1B} and 5-HT_{1D} receptors.

Besides its activities at serotonin receptors, avitriptan has been found to act as a weak aryl hydrocarbon receptor agonist.

== Chemistry ==
Avitriptan is a triptan and a modified analogue of tryptamines like the psychedelic drug dimethyltryptamine (DMT). However, avitriptan itself is not technically a tryptamine as it features a propylamine side chain instead of the ethylamine side chain present in tryptamines. Besides this difference, avitriptan is substituted at the 5 position of the indole ring system and the amine moiety has been cyclized and extended.

The predicted log P of avitriptan is 1.8.

== See also ==
- Triptan
- Donitriptan
