= Sumatriptan =

Medication used for migraines & cluster headaches

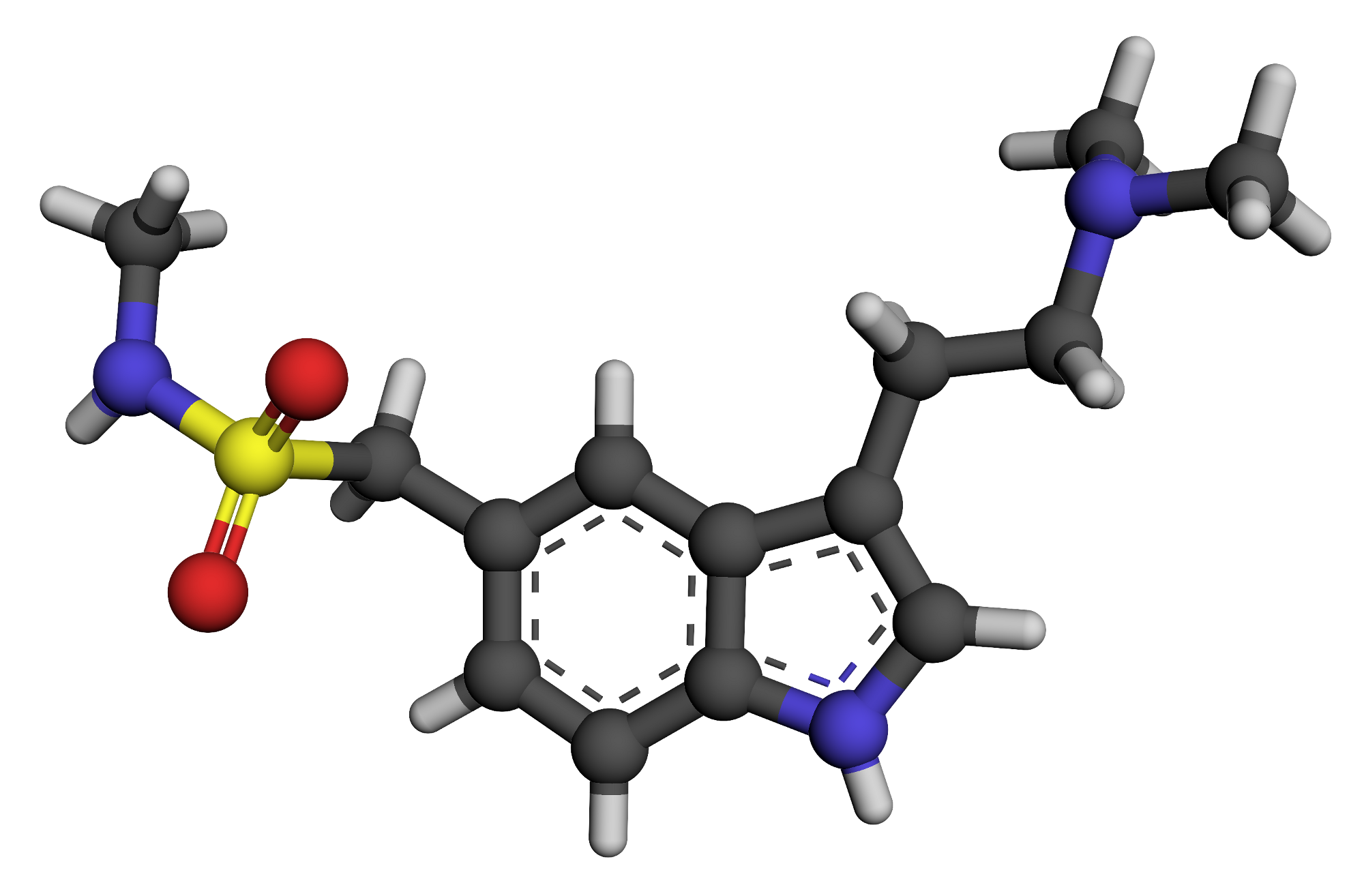

Clinical data
- Trade names: Imitrex, others
- Other names: GR-43175; GR43175; 5-(Methylsulfamoylmethyl)-N,N-dimethyltryptamine; 5-(Methylsulfamoylmethyl)-DMT
- AHFS/Drugs.com: Monograph
- MedlinePlus: a601116
- License data: US DailyMed: Sumatriptan
- Routes of administration: By mouth, subcutaneous, intranasal, transdermal
- Drug class: Antimigraine agent; Triptan; Serotonin 5-HT_{1B}, 5-HT_{1D} receptor, and 5-HT_{1F} receptor agonist
- ATC code: N02CC01 (WHO)

Legal status
- Legal status: CA: ℞-only; UK: P (Pharmacy medicines); US: ℞-only; In general: ℞ (Prescription only)

Pharmacokinetic data
- Bioavailability: 15% (oral); 96% (subcutaneous)
- Protein binding: 14–21%
- Metabolism: Monoamine oxidase (MAO)
- Elimination half-life: 2.5 hours
- Excretion: 60% urine; 40% feces

Identifiers
- IUPAC name: 1-[3-(2-Dimethylaminoethyl)-1H-indol-5-yl]-N-methyl-methanesulfonamide
- CAS Number: 103628-46-2
- PubChem CID: 5358
- IUPHAR/BPS: 54
- DrugBank: DB00669
- ChemSpider: 5165
- UNII: 8R78F6L9VO
- KEGG: D00451
- ChEBI: CHEBI:10650
- ChEMBL: ChEMBL128
- CompTox Dashboard (EPA): DTXSID4023628
- ECHA InfoCard: 100.130.518

Chemical and physical data
- Formula: C_{14}H_{21}N_{3}O_{2}S
- Molar mass: 295.40 g·mol^{−1}
- 3D model (JSmol): Interactive image
- SMILES: O=S(=O)(NC)Cc1cc2c(cc1)[nH]cc2CCN(C)C
- InChI: InChI=1S/C14H21N3O2S/c1-15-20(18,19)10-11-4-5-14-13(8-11)12(9-16-14)6-7-17(2)3/h4-5,8-9,15-16H,6-7,10H2,1-3H3; Key:KQKPFRSPSRPDEB-UHFFFAOYSA-N

Sumatriptan, sold under the brand name Imitrex among others, is a medication used to treat migraine headaches and cluster headaches. It is taken orally, intranasally, or by subcutaneous injection. Therapeutic effects generally occur within three hours. Sumatriptan is a serotonin (5-HT_{1B/1D}) receptor agonist (triptan).

The drug acts as a serotonin 5-HT_{1B}, 5-HT_{1D}, and 5-HT_{1F} receptor agonist and its common side effects include chest pressure, fatigue, vomiting, tingling, and vertigo. Serious side effects may include serotonin syndrome, heart attack, stroke, and seizures. With excessive use, medication overuse headaches may occur. It is unclear if use during pregnancy or breastfeeding is safe. The mechanism of action is not entirely clear. It is in the triptan class of medications.

Sumatriptan was patented in 1982 and approved for medical use in 1992. It is on the World Health Organization's List of Essential Medicines. It is available as a generic medication. In 2023, it was the 107th most commonly prescribed medication in the United States, with more than 6 million prescriptions. It is also available as the combination product sumatriptan/naproxen.

== Medical uses ==
Sumatriptan is indicated for the acute treatment of migraine with or without aura in adults; or the acute treatment of cluster headache in adults.

Sumatriptan is effective for ending or relieving the intensity of migraine and cluster headaches. Injected sumatriptan is more effective than other formulations.

Oral sumatriptan can be used also in the treatment of post-dural puncture headache.

== Contraindications ==
Contraindications of sumatriptan include history of coronary artery disease (atherosclerosis) or coronary artery vasospasm, Wolff–Parkinson–White syndrome or other cardiac accessory conduction pathway disorders, history of stroke, transient ischemic attack, or hemiplegic or basilar migraine, peripheral vascular disease, ischemic bowel disease, uncontrolled hypertension, use of another triptan or ergot-related medication within the last 24 hours, concomitant or recent use of a monoamine oxidase inhibitor (MAOI), hypersensitivity to sumatriptan, and severe hepatic impairment.

== Adverse effects ==
Serious cardiac events, including some that have been fatal, have occurred following the use of sumatriptan injection or tablets. Events reported have included coronary artery vasospasm, transient myocardial ischemia, myocardial infarction, ventricular tachycardia, and ventricular fibrillation. There are reports of Takotsubo cardiomyopathy and transient amnesia after sumatriptan use.

The most common side effects reported by at least 2% of patients in controlled trials of sumatriptan (25, 50, and 100 mg tablets) for migraine are atypical sensations (paresthesia and warm/cold sensations) reported by 4% in the placebo group and 5–6% in the sumatriptan groups, pain and other pressure sensations (including chest pain) reported by 4% in the placebo group and 6–8% in the sumatriptan groups, neurological events (vertigo) reported by less than 1% in the placebo group and less than 1-2% in the sumatriptan groups. Malaise/fatigue occurred in less than 1% of the placebo group and 2–3% of the sumatriptan groups. Sleep disturbance occurred in less than 1% in the placebo group to 2% in the sumatriptan group.

Sumatriptan has a low abuse potential; however overuse is associated with medication overuse headache. Moreover, prolonged sumatriptan use is associated with pronociceptive effects, resulting in allodynia. This effect's association with medication overuse headache, however, is controversial, due to the fact that animal-model studies are not consistent with typical presentation of this disorder.

== Overdose ==
Overdose in animals produced effects including convulsions, tremor, paralysis, inactivity, extremity erythema, abnormal breathing, cyanosis, ataxia, mydriasis, and injection site reactions. The elimination half-life of sumatriptan in humans is 2.5 hours. The effect of dialysis on sumatriptan levels is unknown.

Overdose of sumatriptan can cause sulfhemoglobinemia, a rare condition in which the blood changes from red to green, due to the integration of sulfur into the hemoglobin molecule. If sumatriptan is discontinued, the condition reverses within a few weeks.

== Interactions ==
Concurrent use with other triptans or ergot-containing medications (e.g., ergotamine, dihydroergotamine) within 24 hours can result in additive vasoconstriction. Increased systemic exposure to sumatriptan can occur if used within 2 weeks after a monoamine oxidase inhibitor (MAOI). Cases of serotonin syndrome have been reported with co-administration of triptans and serotonin reuptake inhibitors.

== Pharmacology ==
=== Mechanism of action ===
Sumatriptan activities
Target	Affinity (K_{i}, nM)
5-HT_{1A}	72–1,100 (K_{i}) >10,000 (EC_{50}); 35–93% (E_{max})
5-HT_{1B}	0.5–62 (K_{i}); 12–234 (EC_{50}); 96–102% (E_{max})
5-HT_{1D}	0.5–30 (K_{i}); 2.0–220 (EC_{50}); 86–103% (E_{max})
5-HT_{1E}	646–2,520 (K_{i}); 1,020–10,000 (EC_{50}); 56% (E_{max})
5-HT_{1F}	11–501 (K_{i}); 9.3–250 (EC_{50}); 98% (E_{max})
5-HT_{2A}	376–>10,000 (K_{i}) >10,000 (EC_{50})
5-HT_{2B}	126–>10,000 (K_{i}) >10,000 (EC_{50})
5-HT_{2C}	>10,000 (K_{i}) >10,000 (EC_{50}) (pig)
5-HT_{3}	>10,000 (K_{i}) (rat) >10,000 (EC_{50}) (mouse)
5-HT_{4}	1,000 (K_{i}) (rat) >10,000 (EC_{50}) (guinea pig)
5-HT_{5A}	3,200–5,000
5-HT_{5B}	807–7,943 (rat/mouse)
5-HT_{6}	2,600–>10,000
5-HT_{7}	25–1,380 (K_{i}); 6,030 (EC_{50})
α_{1A}–α_{1D}	ND
α_{2A}–α_{2C}	ND
β_{1}–β_{3}	ND
D_{1}, D_{2}	>10,000
D_{3}–D_{5}	ND
H_{1}–H_{4}	ND
M_{1}–M_{5}	ND
I_{1}, I_{2}	ND
σ_{1}, σ_{2}	ND
TAAR1	ND
SERT	ND
NET	ND
DAT	ND
Notes: The smaller the value, the more avidly the drug binds to the site. All proteins are human unless otherwise specified. Refs:

Sumatriptan is structurally similar to the neurotransmitter serotonin (5-HT) and acts as an agonist of the serotonin 5-HT_{1B}, 5-HT_{1D}, and 5-HT_{1F} receptors. Sumatriptan's primary therapeutic effect is related in its inhibition of the release of calcitonin gene-related peptide (CGRP), likely through its 5-HT_{1D/1B} receptor agonist action. This has been substantiated by the efficacy of more recently developed CGRP targeting drugs and antibodies developed for the preventive treatment of migraine. How agonism of the 5-HT_{1D/1B} receptors inhibits CGRP release is not fully understood. CGRP is believed to cause sensitization of trigeminal nociceptive neurons, contributing to the pain experienced in migraine.

Sumatriptan is also shown to decrease the activity of the trigeminal nerve, which presumably accounts for sumatriptan's efficacy in treating cluster headaches. The injectable form of the drug has been shown to abort a cluster headache within 30 minutes in 77% of cases.

Sumatriptan does not affect oxytocin or vasopressin levels in humans.

=== Pharmacokinetics ===
==== Absorption ====
Sumatriptan is administered in several forms: tablets, subcutaneous injection, and nasal spray. Oral administration (as succinate salt) has low bioavailability, partly due to presystemic metabolism—some of it gets broken down in the stomach and bloodstream before it reaches the target arteries. There is no simple, direct relationship between sumatriptan concentration (pharmacokinetics) per se in the blood and its anti-migraine effect (pharmacodynamics). This paradox has, to some extent, been resolved by comparing the rates of absorption of the various sumatriptan formulations, rather than the absolute amounts of drug that they deliver.

==== Distribution ====
Sumatriptan is a relatively hydrophilic molecule, which may limit its ability to cross the blood–brain barrier and enter the central nervous system. In accordance, early animal studies found lack of indication of central penetration by sumatriptan. This was in contrast to more lipophilic triptans like zolmitriptan, naratriptan, rizatriptan, and eletriptan. For these reasons, it was thought for many years that sumatriptan could not cross the blood–brain barrier in significant amounts to exert central effects.

However, in subsequent animal studies, sumatriptan was found to enter the brain and produce centrally mediated effects. Besides animal research, clinical studies have found sumatriptan to produce centrally mediated side effects such as sleepiness, tiredness, thinking difficulty, and dizziness, among others. In addition, sumatriptan has been found to be discernibly psychoactive in human drug discrimination tests, with effects like apathy, sedation, and mild dysphoria. Certain other clinical findings also support centrally mediated effects of sumatriptan.

A 2010 literature review concluded that sumatriptan can enter the brain to some minor extent in both animals and humans but that this minor penetration is nonetheless sufficient to cause pharmacological effects. Subsequent research has found sumatriptan given during migraine attacks decreases brain serotonin 5-HT_{1B} receptor binding in humans, with a corresponding receptor occupancy of 16%. However, this apparent occupancy could alternatively be due to increased serotonin release during migraine attacks. In contrast to receptor antagonists, it is notable that agonists require only a low fractional receptor occupancy to produce central effects. Relatedly, the serotonin 5-HT_{1B} receptor occupancy observed with sumatriptan was comparable to that with centrally acting opioids. Besides the clinical findings, further animal studies have found that sumatriptan rapidly enters the brain in spite of its poor lipophilicity and was able to do so more quickly than the benzodiazepine oxazepam.

==== Metabolism ====
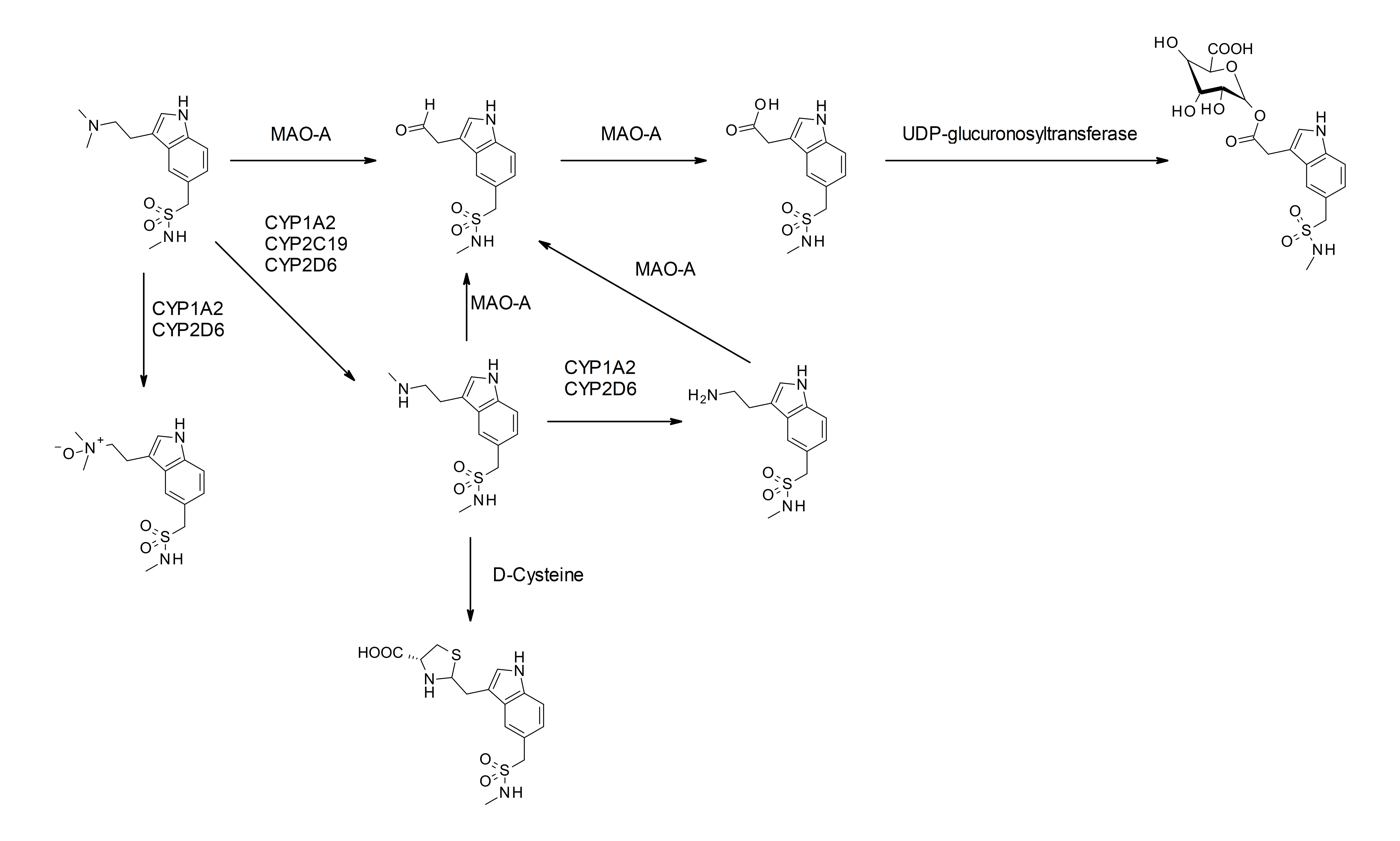
Sumatriptan metabolic pathways (MAO-A – monoamine oxidase A, CYP - cytochrome P450 isoenzymes).

Sumatriptan is metabolized primarily by monoamine oxidase A into indol-3-yl-acetaldehyde and then into corresponding carboxylic acid. It is further modified by UDP-glucuronosyltransferase into a conjugate with glucuronic acid. Other pathways are mediated by cytochrome P450 isoenzymes, which give an N-oxide derivative, and N-desmethyl and N,N-didesmethyl forms (the latter can be converted into the aldehyde by monoamine oxidase A). The N-desmethyl derivative can also undergo a reaction with D-cysteine.

==== Elimination ====
The metabolites of sumatriptan are excreted in the urine and bile. Only about 3% of the active drug may be recovered unchanged.

== Chemistry ==
Sumatriptan, also known as 5-(methylsulfamoylmethyl)-N,N-dimethyltryptamine, is a tryptamine derivative and a 5-substituted derivative of the psychedelic drug dimethyltryptamine (DMT).

The experimental log P of sumatriptan is 0.8 to 0.93 and its predicted log P is 0.46 to 1.17.

== History ==
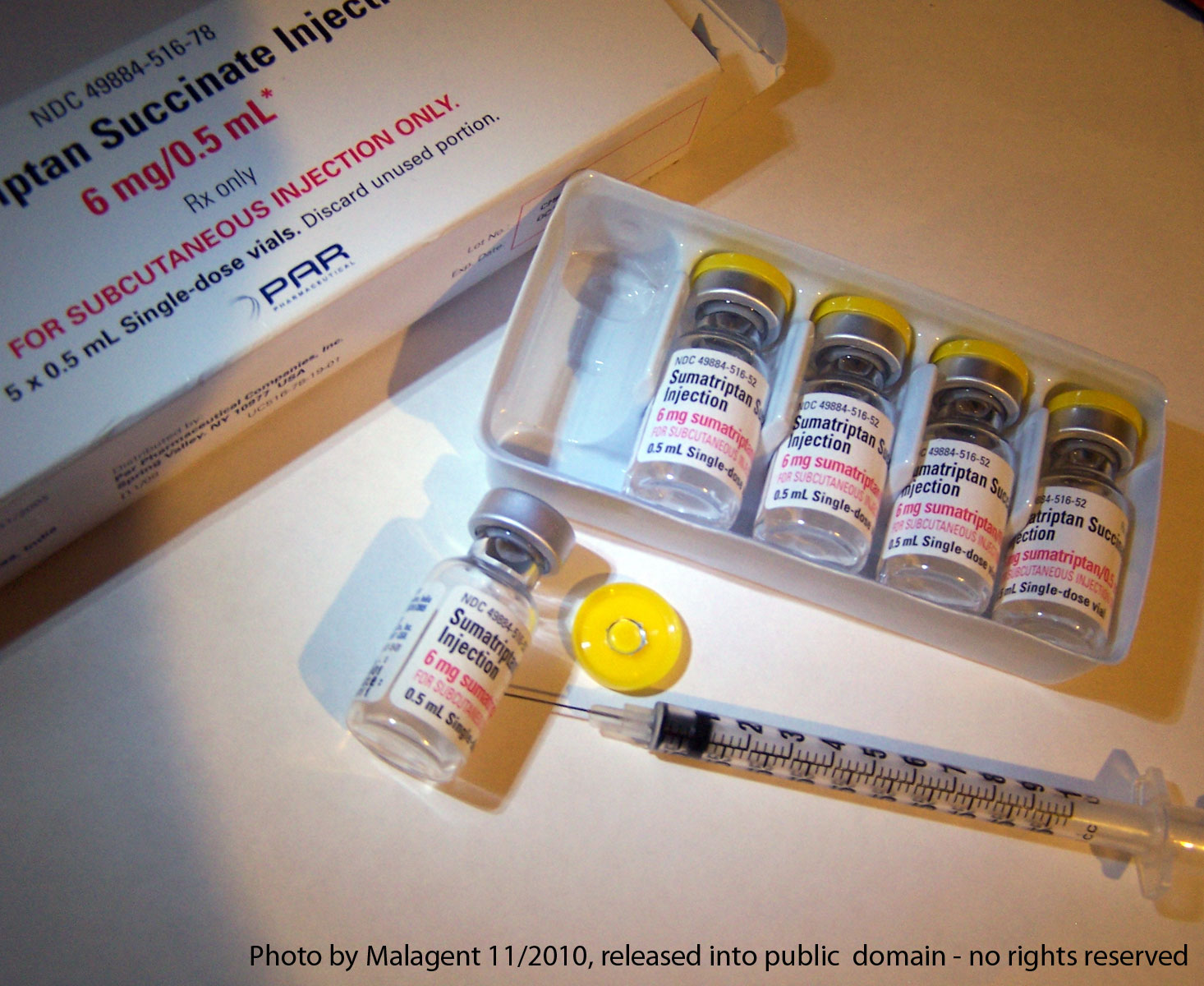
Sumatriptan vials

In 1991, Glaxo received approval for sumatriptan, which was the first available triptan.

In July 2009, the US Food and Drug Administration (FDA) approved a single-use jet injector formulation of sumatriptan. The device delivers a subcutaneous injection of sumatriptan, without the use of a needle. Autoinjectors with needles have been previously available in Europe and North America.

Phase III studies with an iontophoretic transdermal patch (Zelrix/Zecuity) started in July 2008. This patch uses low voltage controlled by a pre-programmed microchip to deliver a single dose of sumatriptan through the skin within 30 minutes. Zecuity was approved by the FDA in January 2013. Sales of Zecuity have been stopped following reports of skin burns and irritation.

== Society and culture ==
=== Legal status ===
In the United States, it is available only by medical prescription. It is available over the counter in many states in Australia. The product requires labelling by a pharmacist and is only available in packs of two without a medical prescription. However, it can be bought over the counter in the UK and Sweden.

=== Generics ===
Glaxo patents for sumatriptan expired in February 2009. At that time, Imitrex sold for about $25 a pill. Par Pharmaceutical then introduced generic versions of sumatriptan injection (sumatriptan succinate injection) 4 and 6 mg starter kits and 4 and 6 mg filled syringe cartridges, and 6 mg vials soon after.

Mylan Laboratories Inc., Sun Pharma, Sandoz (a subsidiary of Novartis), Dr. Reddy's Laboratories, and other companies have been producing generic versions of sumatriptan tablets in 25, 50, and 100 mg doses. Generic forms of the drug are available in US and European markets after Glaxo's patent protections expired in the respective countries. A nasal spray form of sumatriptan known as AVP-825 has been developed by Avanir and is generically available in some countries.

=== Controversy ===
According to the American Headache Society, "Patients frequently state that they have difficulty accessing triptans prescribed to them." In the US, triptans cost from $12 to $120 each, and more than 80% of US health insurance plans place a limit on the number of pills available to a patient per month, which has been called "arbitrary and unfair."
