= Donitriptan =

Chemical compound

Clinical data
- Other names: F-11356; F11356; F-12640; F12640
- Drug class: Serotonin 5-HT_{1B} and 5-HT_{1D} receptor agonist; Antimigraine agent; Triptan
- ATC code: None

Legal status
- Legal status: Never marketed

Identifiers
- IUPAC name: 4-[4-({[3-(2-Aminoethyl)-1H-indol-5-yl]oxy}acetyl)-1-piperazinyl]benzonitrile
- CAS Number: 170912-52-4
- PubChem CID: 197706
- ChemSpider: 171128
- UNII: 70968BVH2J
- ChEMBL: ChEMBL1742428
- CompTox Dashboard (EPA): DTXSID20168974

Chemical and physical data
- Formula: C_{23}H_{25}N_{5}O_{2}
- Molar mass: 403.486 g·mol^{−1}
- 3D model (JSmol): Interactive image
- SMILES: c1cc(ccc1C#N)N2CCN(CC2)C(=O)COc3ccc4c(c3)c(c[nH]4)CCN
- InChI: InChI=1S/C23H25N5O2/c24-8-7-18-15-26-22-6-5-20(13-21(18)22)30-16-23(29)28-11-9-27(10-12-28)19-3-1-17(14-25)2-4-19/h1-6,13,15,26H,7-12,16,24H2; Key:SOHCKWZVTCTQBG-UHFFFAOYSA-N

Donitriptan (INN; developmental code name F-11356) is a triptan drug which was investigated as an antimigraine agent but was never marketed. It acts as a selective serotonin 5-HT_{1B} and 5-HT_{1D} receptor agonist. The drug reached phase 2 clinical trials prior to the discontinuation of its development.

== Pharmacology ==
Donitriptan activities
Target	Affinity (K_{i}, nM)
5-HT_{1A}	12–25 (K_{i}); 182–1,150 (EC_{50})
5-HT_{1B}	0.08–0.36 (K_{i}); 0.10–1.8 (EC_{50}); 94–100% (E_{max})
5-HT_{1D}	0.06–0.48 (K_{i}); 0.27–0.83 (EC_{50}); 97–99% (E_{max})
5-HT_{1E}	1,150–1,700 (K_{i}) >10,000 (EC_{50})
5-HT_{1F}	3,390–6,610 (K_{i}) >10,000 (EC_{50})
5-HT_{2A}	182–447 (K_{i}); 7.9 (EC_{50})
5-HT_{2B}	813 (K_{i}); 25 (EC_{50})
5-HT_{2C}	575 (K_{i}) (rat); ND (EC_{50})
5-HT_{3}	>10,000 (mouse)
5-HT_{4}	2,000 (guinea pig)
5-HT_{5A}	813
5-HT_{6}	2,340
5-HT_{7}	372–617 (K_{i}); 5,890 (EC_{50})
α_{1A}–α_{1D}	ND
α_{2A}–α_{2C}	ND
β_{1}–β_{3}	ND
D_{1}	>10,000
D_{2}	>10,000
D_{3}–D_{5}	ND
H_{1}	>10,000
H_{2}	>10,000
H_{3}, H_{4}	ND
M_{1}–M_{5}	ND
mACh	>10,000
I_{1}, I_{2}	>1,000
σ_{1}, σ_{2}	ND
TAAR1	ND
SERT	>1,000 (IC_{50})
NET	>1,000 (IC_{50})
DAT	>1,000 (IC_{50})
MAO-A	>10,000
MAO-B	>10,000
Notes: The smaller the value, the more avidly the drug binds to the site. All proteins are human unless otherwise specified. Refs:

Donitriptan acts as a high-affinity, high-efficacy near-full agonist of the serotonin 5-HT_{1B} (K_{i} = 0.079–0.40 nM; E_{max} = 94%) and 5-HT_{1D} receptors (K_{i} = 0.063–0.50 nM; E_{max} = 97%), and is among the most potent of the triptan series of drugs. It is also notable and unique among most of the triptans in being a potent serotonin 5-HT_{2A} receptor agonist (EC_{50} = 7.9 nM), albeit with about one or two orders of magnitude lower activational potency than at the serotonin 5-HT_{1B} and 5-HT_{1D} receptors.

== Chemistry ==
Donitriptan is a tryptamine derivative, a 5-substituted derivative of tryptamine and 5-methoxytryptamine, and an analogue of the psychedelic drugs dimethyltryptamine (DMT) and 5-MeO-DMT.

The predicted log P of donitriptan is 1.32 to 2.2.

== History ==
Donitriptan was being developed in France by bioMérieux-Pierre Fabre and made it to phase II clinical trials in Europe before development was discontinued.

== See also ==
- Triptan
- Avitriptan
