= C17H17N3O3 =

The molecular formula C_{17}H_{17}N_{3}O_{3} (molar mass: 311.335 g/mol) may refer to:

- Imazaquin
- (R)-3-Nitrobiphenyline
