= L-694247 =

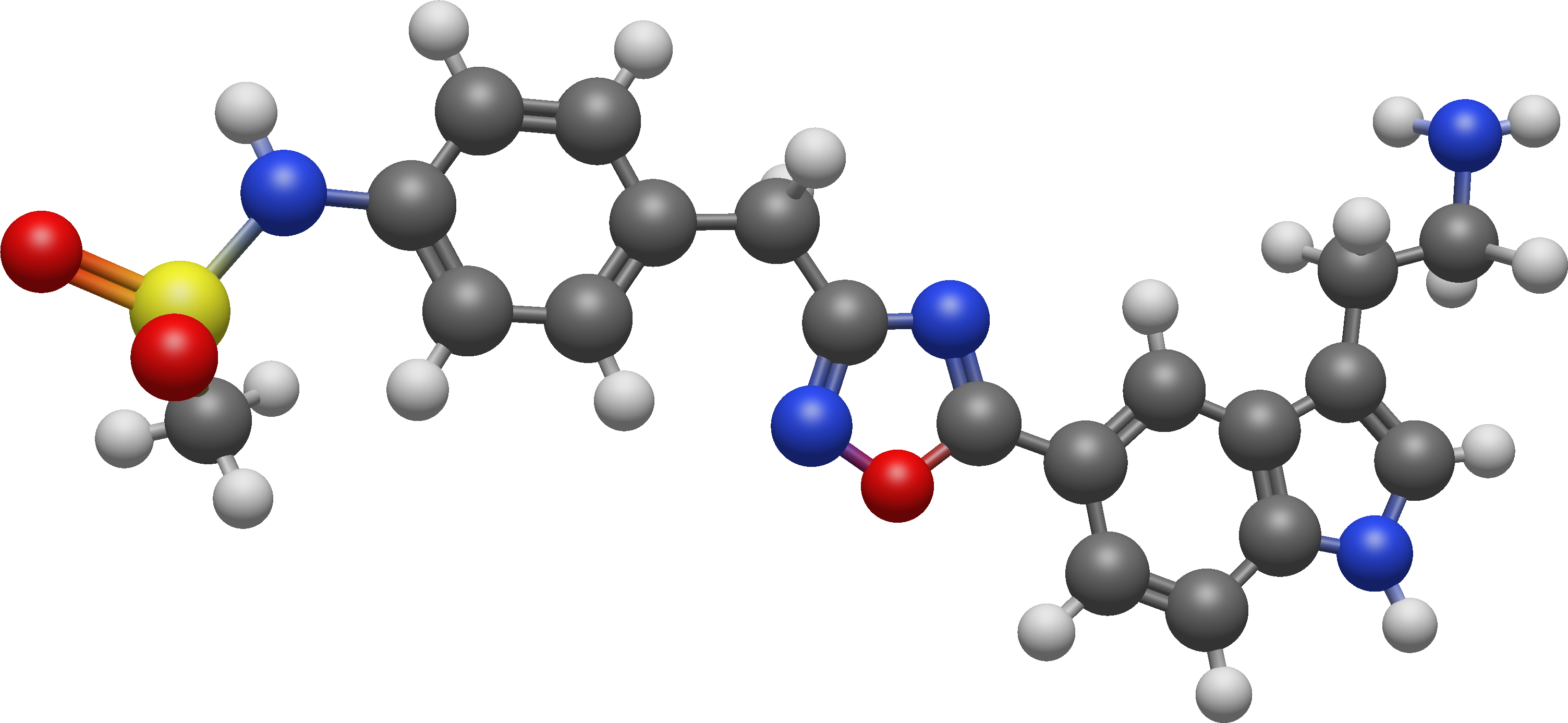

Names
- Preferred IUPAC name N-[4-({5-[3-(2-Aminoethyl)-1H-indol-5-yl]-1,2,4-oxadiazol-3-yl}methyl)phenyl]methanesulfonamide

Identifiers
CAS Number	137403-12-4
3D model (JSmol)	Interactive image
ChEBI	CHEBI:92341
ChEMBL	ChEMBL39317
ChemSpider	116658
PubChem CID	132059
UNII	PZ5DP5EN56
CompTox Dashboard (EPA)	DTXSID20160175
- InChI: InChI=1S/C20H21N5O3S/c1-29(26,27)25-16-5-2-13(3-6-16)10-19-23-20(28-24-19)14-4-7-18-17(11-14)15(8-9-21)12-22-18/h2-7,11-12,22,25H,8-10,21H2,1H3 Key: HKXMQLISPYELRD-UHFFFAOYSA-N
- SMILES: CS(=O)(=O)Nc1ccc(cc1)Cc2nc(on2)c3ccc4c(c3)c(c[nH]4)CCN

Properties
Chemical formula	C_{20}H_{21}N_{5}O_{3}S
Molar mass	411.48 g mol^{−1}
- Except where otherwise noted, data are given for materials in their standard state (at 25 °C [77 °F], 100 kPa). Infobox references

L-694247 is a selective serotonin 5-HT_{1B} and 5-HT_{1D} full agonist, with similar affinities and activational potencies at these two receptors, about 20- to 25-fold greater affinity for the serotonin 5-HT_{1D} receptor over the serotonin 5-HT_{1A} receptor, and negligible affinity for the serotonin 5-HT_{1E} and 5-HT_{1F} receptors.

When L-694247 was injected intraventricularly in dehydrated rats, it inhibited water intake. Pre-treatment with a serotonin 5-HT_{1D} antagonist abolished this effect. Administration of L-694,247 to normally hydrated rats had no effect on water intake.

L-694247 is a 5-substituted tryptamine derivative.

== See also ==
- Triptan
