= External compression headache =

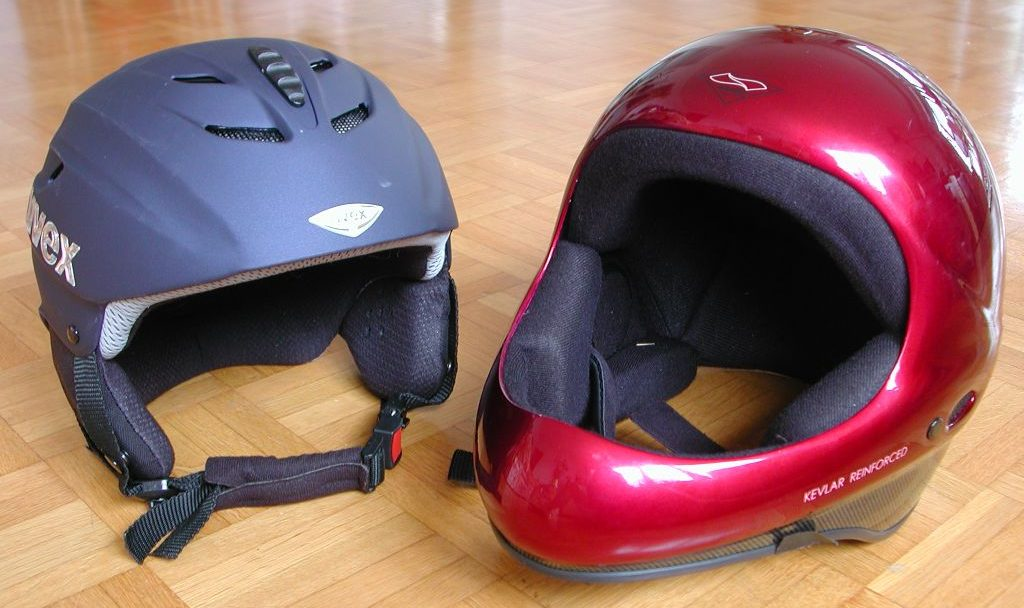
- A photo of a ski helmet and a motorcycle helmet, types of headwear that can cause external-compression headaches if worn tighthly for long periods
- Specialty: Neurology

External compression headache is caused by any type of headwear. This includes headwear that places pressure on the head — including tight hats, helmets, headbands, wigs and other artificial hair accessories, headphones and goggles. It is not known why some people are more sensitive than others to this type of pressure. External compression headaches can affect anyone who uses headwear. The headaches are more common among people who have migraines. It is believed to affect about four percent of the population. It is also referred to as "swim goggle headache".

These headaches can be brought on by such innocuous sources as wearing a halter top (presses against the neck), earplugs (presses against the jaw and inner ear), or wearing even a tiny hair clip (compresses the scalp). There is no known preventive treatment except to avoid the offending trigger. However, once symptoms arise and the trigger is removed, triptan-type migraine treatment is effective.
