= Buspirone/zolmitriptan =

- Buspirone (top) and zolmitriptan (bottom)

Combination of
- Buspirone: Serotonin 5-HT_{1A} receptor agonist
- Zolmitriptan: Serotonin 5-HT_{1B} and 5-HT_{1D} receptor agonist

Clinical data
- Other names: Zolmitriptan/buspirone; AV-2860; AV2860; JM-010; JM010
- Routes of administration: Oral
- Drug class: Non-selective serotonin 5-HT_{1} receptor agonist

Buspirone/zolmitriptan, also known by its developmental code names AV-2860 and JM-010, is a combination of buspirone, a serotonin 5-HT_{1A} receptor partial agonist, and zolmitriptan, a serotonin 5-HT_{1B}, 5-HT_{1D}, 5-HT_{1E}, and 5-HT_{1F} receptor agonist, which is under development for the treatment of drug-induced dyskinesia, specifically levodopa-induced dyskinesia in people with Parkinson's disease. It is taken orally. The drug is under development by Contera Pharma and Bukwang Pharmaceutical. As of November 2024, it is in phase 2 clinical trials for treatment of drug-induced dyskinesia. Buspirone/zolmitriptan has failed to meet its endpoints in phase 2 trials.

== See also ==
- List of investigational Parkinson's disease drugs
- Befiradol (F-13640; NLX-112)
- Piclozotan (SUN-4057)
