= Sumatriptan/naproxen =

Pharmaceutical product

Combination of
- Sumatriptan: Triptan
- Naproxen: Nonsteroidal anti-inflammatory drug (NSAID)

Clinical data
- Trade names: Treximet, Suvexx, others
- AHFS/Drugs.com: Monograph
- License data: US DailyMed: Sumatriptan naproxen
- Routes of administration: By mouth
- ATC code: N02CC51 (WHO)

Legal status
- Legal status: CA: ℞-only; US: ℞-only

Identifiers
- KEGG: D11577

Sumatriptan/naproxen, sold under the brand name Treximet among others, is a fixed-dose combination medication used to treat migraines. It is taken by mouth. It contains sumatriptan, as the succinate, a serotonin 5-hydroxytryptamine (5-HT) 1b/1d receptor agonist (triptan); and naproxen as the sodium salt, a member of the arylacetic acid group of nonsteroidal anti-inflammatory drugs (NSAIDs).

== Medical uses ==
Sumatriptan/naproxen is indicated for the acute treatment of migraine with or without aura in people twelve years of age and older.

A Cochrane review in 2020 found that the combination of sumatriptan plus naproxen was better than placebo for relieving acute migraine attacks in adults. When the starting headache intensity was mild, 5 in 10 (50%) of people treated with the combination were pain-free at two hours compared with about 2 in 10 (18%) with placebo. Almost 6 in 10 (58%) people with moderate or severe pain who were treated with the combination had pain reduced to mild or none at two hours, compared with 3 in 10 (27%) with placebo. The combination was also better than the same dose of either drug given alone in these people. Results were 5 in 10 (52%) people with sumatriptan alone or about 4 in 10 (44%) with naproxen alone.

== Side effects ==
Some of the listed side effects include dizziness, nausea, sleepiness, dry mouth, pain in neck, throat or jaw, numbness or tingling.
