= Meloxicam/rizatriptan =

Combination medication

Combination of
- Meloxicam: Nonsteroidal anti-inflammatory drug
- Rizatriptan: serotonin (5-HT) 1B/1D receptor agonist (triptan)

Clinical data
- Trade names: Symbravo
- AHFS/Drugs.com: Monograph
- MedlinePlus: a625033
- License data: US DailyMed: Meloxicam, rizatriptan
- Routes of administration: By mouth
- ATC code: M01AC56 (WHO)

Legal status
- Legal status: US: ℞-only

Identifiers
- CAS Number: 145202-66-0
- KEGG: D13056

Meloxicam/rizatriptan, sold under the brand name Symbravo, is a fixed-dose combination medication used for the treatment of migraine. It is a combination of meloxicam, a nonsteroidal anti-inflammatory medication; and rizatriptan (as rizatriptan benzoate), a serotonin (5-HT) 1B/1D receptor agonist (triptan). It is taken by mouth.

Meloxicam/rizatriptan was approved for medical use in the United States in January 2025.

== Medical uses ==
Meloxicam/rizatriptan is indicated for the acute treatment of migraine with or without aura in adults.

== Society and culture ==
=== Legal status ===
Meloxicam/rizatriptan was approved for medical use in the United States in January 2025.
