= IS-159 =

Clinical data
- Other names: IS159; Serotonin-O-carboxymethylglycyltyrosinamide; Serotonin-carboxylmethyleneoxy-L-tyrosylglycinamide; 2-(3-(2-aminoethyl)-1H-indol-5-yloxy)acetyl-L-tyrosyl-glycinamide
- Routes of administration: Intranasal, subcutaneous
- Drug class: Serotonin 5-HT_{1B} and 5-HT_{1D} receptor agonist; Triptan-like drug; Antimigraine agent
- ATC code: None

Pharmacokinetic data
- Onset of action: 15–20 minutes (T_{max})
- Elimination half-life: 2–2.5 hours

Identifiers
- IUPAC name: (2S)-2-[[2-[[3-(2-aminoethyl)-1H-indol-5-yl]oxy]acetyl]amino]-N-(2-amino-2-oxoethyl)-3-(4-hydroxyphenyl)propanamide
- CAS Number: 133790-13-3
- PubChem CID: 196859
- ChemSpider: 170507
- UNII: 7N2D7W2TCJ
- CompTox Dashboard (EPA): DTXSID80928273

Chemical and physical data
- Formula: C_{23}H_{27}N_{5}O_{5}
- Molar mass: 453.499 g·mol^{−1}
- 3D model (JSmol): Interactive image
- SMILES: C1=CC(=CC=C1C[C@@H](C(=O)NCC(=O)N)NC(=O)COC2=CC3=C(C=C2)NC=C3CCN)O
- InChI: InChI=1S/C23H27N5O5/c24-8-7-15-11-26-19-6-5-17(10-18(15)19)33-13-22(31)28-20(23(32)27-12-21(25)30)9-14-1-3-16(29)4-2-14/h1-6,10-11,20,26,29H,7-9,12-13,24H2,(H2,25,30)(H,27,32)(H,28,31)/t20-/m0/s1; Key:PBRWGFLPYQYNGI-FQEVSTJZSA-N

IS-159, also known as serotonin-O-carboxymethylglycyltyrosinamide, is a triptan-like serotonin 5-HT_{1B} and 5-HT_{1D} receptor agonist which was under development for the treatment of migraine but was never marketed. It is taken intranasally or subcutaneously.

The drug is a small serotonin-containing peptide and is described as being peripherally selective. It acts as a selective and potent serotonin 5-HT_{1B} and 5-HT_{1D} receptor agonist (K_{i} = 3.2 nM and 1.6 nM, respectively). IS-159 has more than 300-fold lower affinity for the serotonin 5-HT_{1A} receptor (K_{i} = 1,000) and is inactive at the serotonin 5-HT_{1E} and 5-HT_{1F} receptors (K_{i} = >10,000 nM). The drug's pharmacokinetics in humans have been studied.

IS-159 was originated by Immunotech in France and was under development by Immunotech and The Medicines Company in the 1990s and early 2000s, but development was discontinued in 2003. The drug reached phase 2 clinical trials prior to the discontinuation of its development.

== See also ==
- List of investigational headache and migraine drugs
