= C17H25N3O2S =

The molecular formula C_{17}H_{25}N_{3}O_{2}S (molar mass: 335.46 g/mol, exact mass: 335.1667 u) may refer to:

- Almotriptan
- Naratriptan
