= Ergotamine/caffeine =

Pharmaceutical product

Combination of
- Ergotamine: vasoconstrictor, neurotransmitter agonist and antagonist
- Caffeine: vasoconstrictor, phosphodiesterase inhibitor

Clinical data
- Trade names: Cafergot, Migergot, others
- AHFS/Drugs.com: Multum Consumer Information
- MedlinePlus: a601048
- License data: US DailyMed: Ergotamine and caffeine
- Pregnancy category: AU: C; Contraindicated
- Routes of administration: By mouth, rectal
- ATC code: N02CA52 (WHO)

Legal status
- Legal status: US: ℞-only

Identifiers
- CAS Number: 69063-86-1
- KEGG: D07600

Ergotamine/caffeine, sold under the brand name Cafergot among others, is a fixed-dose combination medication used for the treatment of migraine. It contains ergotamine, as the tartrate, an alpha adrenergic blocking agent; and caffeine, a cranial vasoconstrictor.

Ergotamine/caffeine is available as a generic medication.

== Medical uses ==
Ergotamine/caffeine is indicated as therapy to abort or prevent vascular headache.

== Mechanism of action ==
Ergotamine binds to 5-HT_{1B} and 5-HT_{1D} receptors. This along with binding to other serotonergic and dopaminergic receptors is their presumed mechanism of action in treating migraine.

== Adverse effects ==
Because the vasoconstrictive effects of ergotamine and caffeine are not selective for the brain, adverse effects due to systemic vasoconstriction can occur. Cold feet or hands, angina pectoris, myocardial infarction, or dizziness are some examples.

It has also been shown to be associated with mitral valve stenosis.
