= Headache attributed to a substance or its withdrawal =

- Specialty: Neurology

Headaches can be attributed to many different substances. Some of these include alcohol, NO, carbon monoxide poisoning, cocaine, caffeine and monosodium glutamate. Chronic use of certain medications used to treat headaches can also start causing headaches, known as medication overuse headaches. Headaches may also be a symptom of medication withdrawal.

== Classification ==
These headaches have been further sub classified by the ICHD2 into

- Headaches induced by acute substance use or exposure
- Medication overuse headaches (MOH)
- Headaches attributed to chronic medication use
- Headaches attributed to substance withdrawal

== Causes ==
A number of different causes contribute to this class of headache. Several common chemicals may be the culprit. Nitrite compounds dilate blood vessels, causing dull and pounding headaches with repeat exposure. Nitrite is found in dynamite, heart medicine and it is a chemical used to preserve meat (ergo these being known as "nitrite" or "hot dog" headaches). Eating foods prepared with monosodium glutamate (MSG) may thus result in headache. Acetaldehyde from alcohol may also cause a headache either acutely or after a number of hours (hangover).

Poisons, like carbon tetrachloride found in insecticides and lead can also cause headaches with repeated exposure. Ingesting lead paint or having contact with lead batteries can cause headaches, and so can exposure to materials that contain chemical solvents, like benzene, which are found in turpentine, spray adhesives, rubber cement, and inks. Headaches are also a symptom of carbon monoxide poisoning.

Drugs such as amphetamines can cause headaches as a side effect. Another type of drug-related headache occurs during withdrawal from long-term therapy with the antimigraine drug ergotamine tartrate. This is more commonly known as rebound headache, although some sources use the term interchangeably.

== Diagnosis ==
Headaches due to environmental causes are usually diagnosed by taking an exposure history.

== Treatment ==
These headaches are treated by determining the cause of the headache and treating or removing this cause
