= Arthur Stoll =

Swiss biochemist

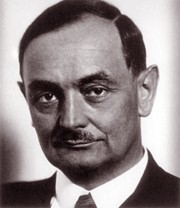
- Born: 8 January 1887; Schinznach-Dorf, Aargau, Switzerland
- Died: 13 January 1971 (aged 84); Dornach, Solothurn, Switzerland
- Education: ETH Zurich
- Awards: Marcel Benoist Prize (1942); Fellow of the Royal Society
- Scientific career
- Workplaces: Ludwig-Maximilians-Universität München

Arthur Stoll (8 January 1887 – 13 January 1971) was a Swiss biochemist.

== Education and career ==
The son of a teacher and school headmaster, he studied chemistry at ETH Zurich, with a PhD in 1911, where he studied with Richard Willstätter. In 1912, he became a research assistant at the Kaiser Wilhelm Institute for Chemistry in Berlin, with Richard Willstätter, with whom he explored important insights on the importance of chlorophyll in carbon assimilation.

In 1917, he was appointed professor of chemistry at the Ludwig-Maximilians-Universität München. In the same year, he was hired as head of the pharmaceutical department of the Sandoz chemical factory in Basel. In this company, he was president from 1949 to 1956, Director from 1964 he held the office of President of the Board.

Together with Sandoz employees, he developed a range of methods for producing drugs. Thus, he developed the first isolation of ergot alkaloids (as ergotamine and ergobasine) and cardiac glycosides, which are used as a medicine for heart diseases and migraines. A continuous process for the production of soluble calcium salts was developed. He worked with Albert Hofmann.

== Personal life ==
Stoll also collected modern art, including paintings by Ferdinand Hodler.

=== Werner Stoll ===
Arthur Stoll had a son, Werner A. Stoll (1915–1995), a psychiatrist who conducted clinical studies on LSD with Albert Hofmann after Hofmann discovered LSD in 1943.

== Awards ==
- member of the German Academy of Natural Scientists Leopoldina
- Foreign member of the Royal Swedish Academy of Sciences
- Foreign Member of the Royal Society
- 1959 Paul Karrer Gold Medal
