= (R)-3-Nitrobiphenyline =

Drug

Clinical data
- MedlinePlus: a682611

Identifiers
- IUPAC name: (R)-2-[1-(3'-Nitrobiphenyl-2-yloxy)ethyl]-4,5-dihydro-1H-imidazole
- CAS Number: 945618-95-1
- PubChem CID: 16757089
- ChemSpider: 23288036
- UNII: PQ8VMX7SUU
- ChEMBL: ChEMBL242693
- CompTox Dashboard (EPA): DTXSID401028500

Chemical and physical data
- Formula: C_{17}H_{17}N_{3}O_{3}
- Molar mass: 311.341 g·mol^{−1}
- 3D model (JSmol): Interactive image
- SMILES: c2ccc([N](=O)=O)cc2-c1ccccc1OC(C)C3=NCCN3
- InChI: InChI=1S/C17H17N3O3/c1-12(17-18-9-10-19-17)23-16-8-3-2-7-15(16)13-5-4-6-14(11-13)20(21)22/h2-8,11-12H,9-10H2,1H3,(H,18,19)/t12-/m1/s1; Key:NMSAVNXFCXMJJY-GFCCVEGCSA-N

(R)-3-Nitrobiphenyline is a drug. As an α_{2}-adrenergic agonist, it activates α_{2} adrenergic receptors, which respond to the hormones adrenaline (also known as epinephrine) and noradrenaline (norepinephrine). It is selective for the α_{2C} subtype, as well as being a weak antagonist at the α_{2A} and α_{2B} subtypes. It has been used in scientific research to characterize the binding and functional properties of the α_{2C} subtype.
