= 5-HT5B receptor =

5-HT receptor protein and the gene which encodes it

HTR5BP

Identifiers
- Aliases: HTR5BP, 5-HT5B, GPR134, HTR5B, 5-hydroxytryptamine receptor 5B, pseudogene
- External IDs: MGI: 96284; GeneCards: HTR5BP

Gene location (Mouse)
Chr.	Chromosome 1 (mouse)
Band	1 E2.3|1 52.98 cM	Start	121,437,571 bp
Band	1 E2.3|1 52.98 cM	End	121,456,194 bp
Orthologs
Databases	NCBI: entry; OMA: entry
Species	Human	Mouse
Entrez	645694	15564
Ensembl	ENSG00000125631	ENSMUSG00000050534
UniProt	n a	P31387
RefSeq (mRNA)	n/a	NM_010483
RefSeq (protein)	n/a	NP_034613
Location (UCSC)	n/a	Chr 1: 121.44 – 121.46 Mb
PubMed search
- Wikidata
View/Edit Human	View/Edit Mouse

5-HT_{5B} receptor is a 5-HT receptor protein and the gene which encodes it. The protein is found in rodents, but not in humans, because stop codons in the gene's coding sequence prevent the gene from expressing a functional protein. It is believed that the function of the 5-HT_{5B} receptor has been replaced in humans by some other subclass of 5-HT receptor. 5-HT_{5B} receptor is a G protein-coupled receptor. 5-HT_{5B} receptor mRNA is expressed primarily in the habenula, hippocampus and inferior olive of rat brains. Known agonists for 5-HT_{5B} include ergotamine and LSD. Known antagonists include methiothepin.
