= Ergotamine =

Chemical compound in the ergot family of alkaloids

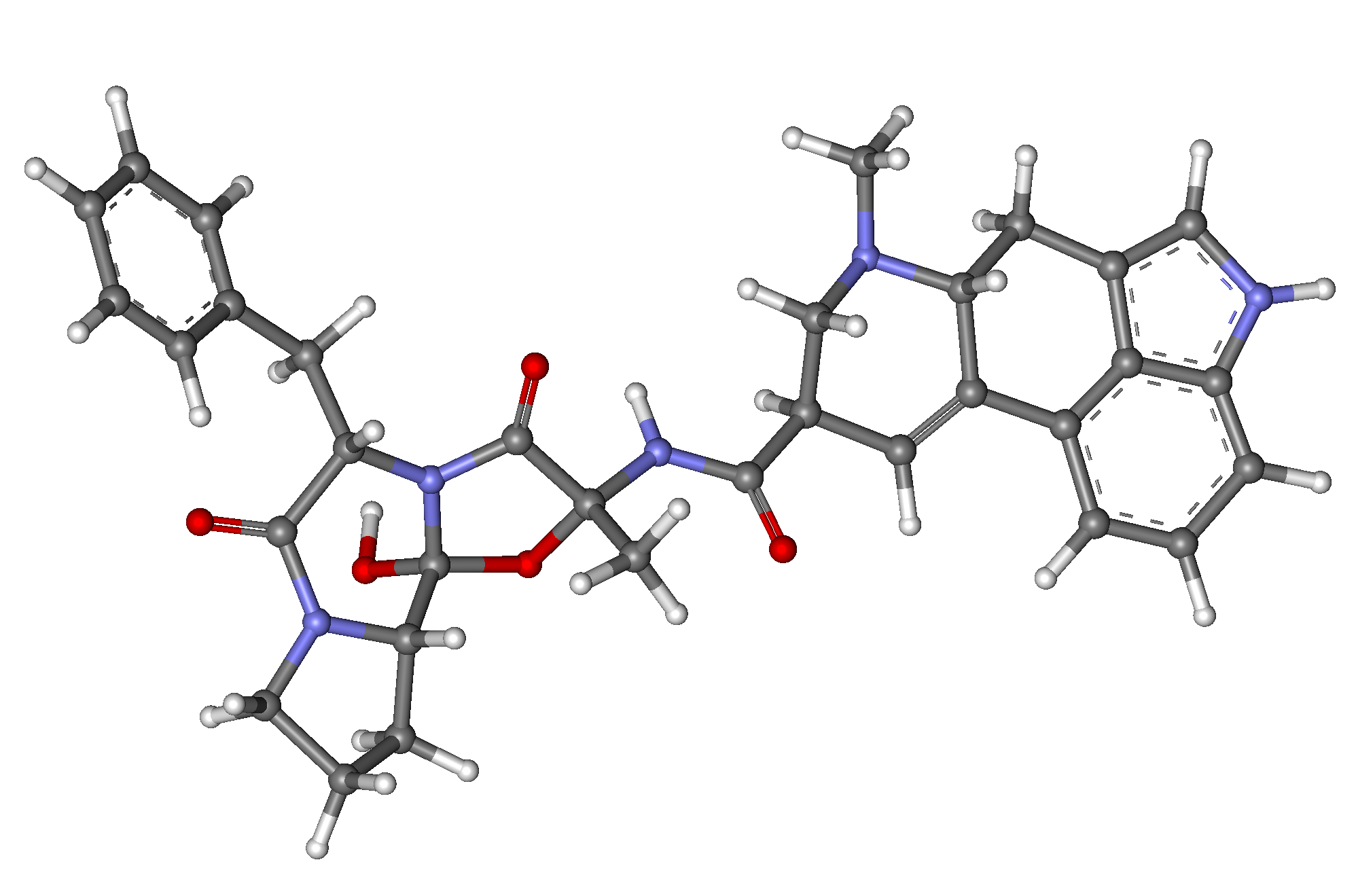

Clinical data
- Trade names: Ergomar, others
- Other names: 2'-Methyl-5'α-benzyl-12'-hydroxy-3',6',18-trioxoergotaman; 9,10α-Dihydro-12'-hydroxy-2'-methyl-5'α-(phenylmethyl)ergotaman-3',6',18-trione
- AHFS/Drugs.com: Monograph
- License data: US DailyMed: Ergotamine
- Pregnancy category: AU: C; US: Contraindicated
- Routes of administration: Oral
- ATC code: N02CA02 (WHO)

Legal status
- Legal status: AU: S4 (Prescription only); BR: Class D1 (Drug precursors); CA: Schedule VI; UK: POM (Prescription only); US: ℞-only

Pharmacokinetic data
- Bioavailability: Intravenous: 100%, Intramuscular: 47%, Oral: <1% (Enhanced by co-administration of caffeine)
- Metabolism: Liver
- Elimination half-life: 2 hours
- Excretion: 90% Bile duct

Identifiers
- IUPAC name: (6aR,9R)-N-((2R,5S,10aS,10bS)-5-Benzyl-10b-hydroxy-2-methyl-3,6-dioxooctahydro-2H-oxazolo[3,2-a]pyrrolo[2,1-c]pyrazin-2-yl)-7-methyl-4,6,6a,7,8,9-hexahydroindolo[4,3-fg]quinoline-9-carboxamide
- CAS Number: 113-15-5
- PubChem CID: 8223
- IUPHAR/BPS: 149
- DrugBank: DB00696
- ChemSpider: 7930
- UNII: PR834Q503T
- KEGG: D07906
- ChEBI: CHEBI:64318
- ChEMBL: ChEMBL442
- PDB ligand: ERM (PDBe, RCSB PDB)
- CompTox Dashboard (EPA): DTXSID9043774
- ECHA InfoCard: 100.003.658

Chemical and physical data
- Formula: C_{33}H_{35}N_{5}O_{5}
- Molar mass: 581.673 g·mol^{−1}
- 3D model (JSmol): Interactive image
- SMILES: C[C@@]1(C(=O)N2[C@H](C(=O)N3CCC[C@H]3[C@@]2(O1)O)CC4=CC=CC=C4)NC(=O)[C@H]5CN([C@@H]6CC7=CNC8=CC=CC(=C78)C6=C5)C
- InChI: InChI=1S/C33H35N5O5/c1-32(35-29(39)21-15-23-22-10-6-11-24-28(22)20(17-34-24)16-25(23)36(2)18-21)31(41)38-26(14-19-8-4-3-5-9-19)30(40)37-13-7-12-27(37)33(38,42)43-32/h3-6,8-11,15,17,21,25-27,34,42H,7,12-14,16,18H2,1-2H3,(H,35,39)/t21-,25-,26+,27+,32-,33+/m1/s1; Key:XCGSFFUVFURLIX-VFGNJEKYSA-N

Ergotamine, sold under the brand name Ergomar among others, is an ergopeptine and part of the ergot family of alkaloids; it is structurally and biochemically closely related to ergoline. It is structurally similar to several neurotransmitters, and it acts as a vasoconstrictor. It is used for acute migraines, sometimes with caffeine as the combination ergotamine/caffeine.

The drug is a non-selective modulator or agonist of serotonin receptors and other receptors. It is peripherally selective and crosses into the brain in minimal amounts.

Medicinal use of ergot fungus began in the 16th century, for the induction of childbirth; but dosage uncertainty discouraged its use. It has been used to prevent post-partum hemorrhage (bleeding after childbirth). It was first isolated from the ergot fungus by Arthur Stoll, at Sandoz in 1918, and was marketed as Gynergen in 1921.

== Medical uses ==
Ergotamine is indicated as therapy to abort or prevent vascular headache.

=== Available forms ===
Ergotamine is available as a suppository and as a tablet, sometimes as a combination drug, alongside caffeine.

Previously, ergotamine was combined with belladonna extract and phenobarbital known as Bellaraminal.

== Contraindications ==
Contraindications include: atherosclerosis, Buerger's syndrome, coronary artery disease, hepatic disease, pregnancy, pruritus, Raynaud's syndrome, and renal disease. It's also contraindicated if patient is taking macrolide antibiotics (e.g., erythromycin), certain HIV protease inhibitors (e.g., ritonavir, nelfinavir, indinavir), certain azole antifungals (e.g., ketoconazole, itraconazole, voriconazole) delavirdine, efavirenz, or a 5-HT_{1} receptor agonist (e.g., sumatriptan).

== Side effects ==
Side effects of ergotamine include nausea and vomiting. At higher doses, it can cause raised arterial blood pressure, vasoconstriction (including coronary vasospasm) and bradycardia or tachycardia. Severe vasoconstriction may cause symptoms of intermittent claudication.

== Pharmacology ==
=== Pharmacodynamics ===
Ergotamine interacts with serotonin, adrenergic, and dopamine receptors. It is an agonist of serotonin receptors including the serotonin 5-HT_{1} and 5-HT_{2} subtypes. Ergotamine is an agonist of the serotonin 5-HT_{2B} receptor and has been associated with cardiac valvulopathy. Despite acting as a potent serotonin 5-HT_{2A} receptor agonist, ergotamine is said to be non-hallucinogenic similarly to lisuride. This has been posited to be due to functional selectivity at the serotonin 5-HT_{2A} receptor. However, ergotamine is also peripherally selective, which may instead account for its lack of psychedelic effects.

Activities of ergotamine at various sites
Site	Affinity (K_{i}/IC_{50} [nM])	Efficacy (E_{max} [%])	Action
5-HT_{1A}	0.17–0.3	?	Full agonist
5-HT_{1B}	0.3–4.7	?	Agonist
5-HT_{1D}	0.3–6.0	?	Agonist
5-HT_{1E}	19–840	?	Agonist
5-HT_{1F}	170–171	?	Agonist
5-HT_{2A}	0.64–0.97	?	Full agonist
5-HT_{2B}	1.3–45	?	Partial agonist
5-HT_{2C}	1.9–9.8	?	Partial agonist
5-HT_{3}	>10,000	–	–
5-HT_{4}	65	?	?
5-HT_{5A}	14	?	Agonist
5-HT_{5B}	3.2–16	?	?
5-HT_{6}	12	?	?
5-HT_{7}	1,291	?	Agonist
α_{1A}	15–>10,000	–	–
α_{1B}	12–>10,000	–	–
α_{1D}	?	?	?
α_{2A}	106	?	?
α_{2B}	88	?	?
α_{2C}	>10,000	–	–
β_{1}	>10,000	–	–
β_{2}	>10,000	–	–
D_{1}	>10,000	–	–
D_{2}	4.0–>10,000	–	Agonist
D_{3}	3.2–>10,000	–	–
D_{4}	12–>10,000	–	–
D_{5}	170	?	?
H_{1}	>10,000	–	–
H_{2}	>10,000	–	–
M_{1}	862	?	?
M_{2}	911	?	?
M_{3}	>10,000	–	–
M_{4}	>10,000	–	–
M_{5}	>10,000	–	–
Notes: All receptors are human except 5-HT_{5A} (mouse/rat) and 5-HT_{5B} (mouse/rat—no human counterpart). No affinity for histamine H_{1} or H_{2}, cannabinoid CB_{1}, GABA, glutamate, or nicotinic acetylcholine receptors, nor the monoamine transporters (all >10,000 nM).

=== Pharmacokinetics ===
The bioavailability of ergotamine is around 2% orally, 6% rectally, and 100% by intramuscular or intravenous injection. The low oral and rectal bioavailability is due to low gastrointestinal absorption and high first-pass metabolism.

However, ergotamine does not readily cross the blood–brain barrier and hence is peripherally selective. This is due to it being an avid substrate for P-glycoprotein and breast cancer resistance protein (BCRP). Only minimal amounts of the drug (~1%) cross into the brain.

== Natural occurrence ==
=== Biosynthesis ===
Ergotamine is a secondary metabolite (natural product) and the principal alkaloid produced by the ergot fungus, Claviceps purpurea, and related fungi in the family Clavicipitaceae. Its biosynthesis in these fungi requires the amino acid L-tryptophan and dimethylallyl pyrophosphate. These precursor compounds are the substrates for the enzyme, tryptophan dimethylallyltransferase, catalyzing the first step in ergot alkaloid biosynthesis, i.e., the prenylation of L-tryptophan. Further reactions, involving methyltransferase and oxygenase enzymes, yield the ergoline, lysergic acid. Lysergic acid (LA) is the substrate of lysergyl peptide synthetase, a nonribosomal peptide synthetase, which covalently links LA to the amino acids, L-alanine, L-proline, and L-phenylalanine. Enzyme-catalyzed or spontaneous cyclizations, oxygenations/oxidations, and isomerizations at selected residues precede, and give rise to, formation of ergotamine.

== Society and culture ==
=== Legal status ===
==== United States ====
Ergotamine is a List I regulated chemical in the United States.

== See also ==
- Substituted ergoline
- Non-hallucinogenic 5-HT_{2A} receptor agonist
