= Triptan =

Class of pharmaceutical drugs

Triptans
- Drug class
- Chemical structure of sumatriptan, the prototypical triptan

Class identifiers
- Use: Migraine, cluster headache
- ATC code: N02CC
- Biological target: Serotonin 5-HT_{1B}, 5-HT_{1D}, and 5-HT_{1F} receptors

Legal status

Triptans are a family of antimigraine drugs used to abort migraines and cluster headaches. While effective at treating individual headaches, they do not provide preventive treatment and are not curative. They are not effective for the treatment of tension–type headache, except in persons who also experience migraines. Triptans do not relieve other kinds of pain. They are taken orally and by other routes.

The drugs of this class act as agonists for serotonin 5-HT_{1B} and 5-HT_{1D} receptors at blood vessels and nerve endings in the brain. Some also activate the 5-HT_{1F} receptor. Structurally, triptans are substituted tryptamines or closely related to tryptamines, for instance the psychedelic drug dimethyltryptamine (DMT).

The first clinically available triptan was sumatriptan, which has been marketed since 1991. Subsequently, a variety of other triptans have also been marketed, including zolmitriptan, naratriptan, rizatriptan, almotriptan, eletriptan, and frovatriptan. Triptans have largely replaced ergoline drugs like ergotamine and dihydroergotamine, an older class of medications used to relieve migraine and cluster headaches.

== Medical uses ==
=== Migraine ===
Triptans are used for the treatment of severe migraine attacks or those that do not respond to NSAIDs or other over-the-counter drugs. Triptans are a mid-line treatment suitable for many migraineurs with typical attacks. They may not work for atypical or unusually severe migraine attacks, transformed migraine, or status migrainosus (continuous migraine).

Triptans are highly effective, reducing the symptoms or aborting the attack within 30 to 90 minutes in 70–80% of patients. A 2024 systematic review and network meta analysis compared the effectiveness of medications for acute migraine attacks in adults. It found that triptans were the most effective class of drugs followed by non-steroidal anti-inflammatories.

A test measuring a person's skin sensitivity during a migraine may indicate whether the individual will respond to treatment with triptans. Triptans are most effective in those with no skin sensitivity; with skin sensitivity, it is best to take triptans within twenty minutes of the headache's onset.

Oral rizatriptan and nasal zolmitriptan are the most used triptans for migraines in children.

==== Correct timing of intake ====
Triptans should be taken as soon as possible after the onset of pain. In case of migraine with aura they are to be taken after the aura and with the onset of pain. If taken too early, they may not have the full effect on symptom reduction, and in case of an aura, they can worsen the aura. It is assumed that blood vessels are constricted during the aura phase and dilated during the pain phase, so a constrictive medication like a triptan is not recommended during the aura.

=== Cluster headache ===
Triptans are effective for the treatment of cluster headache. This has been demonstrated for subcutaneous sumatriptan and intranasal zolmitriptan, the former of which is more effective according to a 2013 Cochrane review. Tablets were not considered appropriate in this review.

=== Altitude sickness ===
A single randomized controlled trial found that sumatriptan may be able to prevent altitude sickness.

=== Available forms ===
All marketed triptans are available in oral form; some in form of sublingual tablets. Sumatriptan and zolmitriptan are also available as nasal sprays. For sumatriptan, a number of other application forms are marketed: suppositories, a subcutaneous injection, an iontophoretic transdermal patch, which uses low voltage controlled by a pre-programmed microchip to deliver a single dose of sumatriptan through the skin within 30 minutes; a drug-device combination containing sumatriptan powder that is "breath powered" allowing the user to blow sumatriptan powder in to their nostrils; as well as a needle-free injection system that works with air pressure.

Formulations
Tablet	Oral disintegrating tablets	Nasal spray	Subcutaneous injection	Rectal suppository
all triptans	rizatriptan	sumatriptan	sumatriptan	sumatriptan
	zolmitriptan	zolmitriptan		

== Contraindications ==
All triptans are contraindicated in patients with cardiovascular diseases (coronary spasms, symptomatic coronary artery disease, after a heart attack or stroke, uncontrolled hypertension, Raynaud's disease, peripheral artery disease). Most triptans are also contraindicated during pregnancy and breastfeeding and for patients younger than 18; but sumatriptan and zolmitriptan nasal sprays are also approved for youths over 12. In spite of expert opinion and evidence to the contrary, the FDA and some other drug governance bodies have stated that monoamine oxidase inhibitors are contraindicated for sumatriptan, zolmitriptan and rizatriptan, and combination with ergot alkaloids such as ergotamine for all substances.

At least two triptans (sumatriptan and rizatriptan) have been listed under the unacceptable medication by the Canadian Blood Services as a potential risk to the recipient; hence, donors are required not to have taken the medication for the last 72 hours.

== Adverse effects ==
Triptans have few side effects if used in correct dosage and frequency. The most common adverse effect is recurrence of migraine. A systematic review found that "rizatriptan 10 mg was the only triptan with a recurrence rate [the reappearance of moderate to severe pain within 24 hours after the response at 2 hours] greater than that of placebo".

There is a theoretical risk of coronary spasm in patients with established heart disease, and cardiac events after taking triptans may rarely occur.

== Interactions ==
Combination of triptans with other serotonergic drugs such as ergot alkaloids, monoamine oxidase inhibitors, selective serotonin reuptake inhibitors (SSRIs), serotonin–norepinephrine reuptake inhibitors (SNRIs) or St John's wort has been alleged to induce symptoms of a serotonin syndrome (a syndrome of changes in mental status, autonomic instability, neuromuscular abnormalities, and gastrointestinal symptoms), whereas scientific studies indicate there is no potential for life-threatening serotonin syndrome in patients taking triptans and SSRI or SNRIs at the same time, although the FDA has officially stated otherwise. Combining triptans with ergot alkaloids is contraindicated because of the danger of coronary spasms.

In a study from Harvard Medical School and the University of Florida College of Medicine involving 47,968 patients and published on 26 February 2018, concomitant use of a selective serotonin reuptake inhibitor or selective norepinephrine reuptake inhibitor for depression with a triptan for migraine did not demonstrate an increased risk of the serotonin syndrome.

Pharmacokinetic interactions (for example, mediated by CYP liver enzymes or transporter proteins) are different for the individual substances; for most triptans, they are mild to absent. Eletriptan blood plasma levels are increased by strong inhibitors of CYP3A4, and frovatriptan levels by CYP1A2 inhibitors such as fluvoxamine.

== Pharmacology ==
=== Mechanism of action ===
Their action is attributed to their agonist effects on serotonin 5-HT_{1B} and 5-HT_{1D} receptors in blood vessels (causing their constriction) and nerve endings in the brain, and subsequent inhibition of pro-inflammatory neuropeptide release, including CGRP and substance P. Triptans are selective agents for 5-HT_{1B} and 5-HT_{1D} and have low or even no affinity for other types of 5-HT receptors.

5-HT receptors are classified into seven different families named 5-HT_{1} to 5-HT_{7}. All receptors are G protein coupled receptors with seven transmembrane domains with the one exception of 5-HT_{3} receptor which is a ligand gated ion channel. There is a high homology in the amino acid sequence within each family. Each family couples to the same second messenger systems. Subtypes of 5-HT_{1} are the 5-HT_{1A}, 5-HT_{1B}, 5-HT_{1D}, 5-HT_{1E} and 5-HT_{1F} receptors. All 5-HT_{1D} receptors are coupled to inhibition of adenylate cyclase. 5-HT_{1B} and 5-HT_{1D} receptors have been difficult to distinguish on a pharmacological basis. After cloning two distinct genes for 5-HT_{1B} and 5-HT_{1D} receptors, a better insight into distribution and expression in different tissues was gained, except in brain tissue where they are overlapping in several areas.

Most mammalian species, including humans, have 5-HT_{1D} binding sites widely distributed throughout the central nervous system. 5-HT_{1D} receptors are found in all areas of the brain but they differ in quantity at each area. An important initiator of head pain is suggested to be the activation of trigeminovascular afferent nerves which upon activation releases neuropeptides such as CGRP, substance P and neurokinin A. Also they are thought to promote neurogenic inflammatory response important for sensitization of sensory afferents, and also transmission and generation of head pain centrally. 5-HT_{1D} has been found responsible for inhibition of neurogenic inflammation upon administration with sumatriptan and other related compounds that act on prejunctional 5-HT_{1D} receptors.

All triptans, like the older drug dihydroergotamine, have agonistic effects on the 5-HT_{1D} receptor. Comparison of sumatriptan and dihydroergotamine showed that dihydroergotamine has high affinity and sumatriptan has medium affinity for 5-HT_{1D}. Triptans have at least three modes of action. These antimigraine mechanisms are:

1. vasoconstriction of pain producing intra cranial extracerebral vessels by a direct effect on vascular smooth muscle. Sumatriptan and rizatriptan have been shown to cause vasoconstriction in the human middle meningeal arteries.
2. inhibition of vasoactive neuropeptide release by trigeminal terminals innervating intracranial vessels and the dura mater. The trigeminocervical complex has 5-HT_{1D} receptors that bind dihydroergotamine and triptans in humans. Rizatriptan has been shown to block dural vasodilation and plasma protein extravasation by inhibiting the release of CGRP via activation of receptors on preganglionic trigeminal sensory nerve terminals. Sumatriptan is shown to inhibit potassium stimulated CGRP secretion from cultured trigeminal neurons in a dose dependant manner and may also inhibit the release of substance P.
3. inhibition of nociceptive neurotransmission within the trigeminocervical complex in the brainstem and upper cervical spinal column. Rizatriptan has central trigeminal antinociceptive activity.

Other possibilities of triptans in antimigraine effects are modulation of nitric oxide dependent signal transduction pathways, nitric oxide scavenging in the brain, and sodium dependent cell metabolic activity.

Most of the triptans, for instance sumatriptan, zolmitriptan, and others, are inactive as serotonin 5-HT_{2A} receptor agonists. However, a few triptans, including donitriptan, avitriptan, and eletriptan, have been found to act as serotonin 5-HT_{2A} receptor agonists, albeit with one to three orders of magnitude lower activational potency than at the serotonin 5-HT_{1B} and 5-HT_{1D} receptors.

=== Pharmacokinetics ===
Triptans have a wide variety of pharmacokinetic properties. Bioavailability is between 14% and 70%, biological half-life (T_{1/2}) is between 2 and 26 hours. Their good ability to cross the blood–brain barrier and the rather long half-life of some triptans may result in lower frequencies of migraine recurrence.

=== Comparison ===
Comparative pharmacology of marketed triptans in their oral formulations
Drug	Brand	Company	Targets	5-HT_{1D} affinity (K_{i})	F	log P	log D (at pH 7.4)	T_{max}	T_{1/2}	Metabolism	Dose
Sumatriptan	Imitrex	GSK	5-HT_{1B/D}	3.2–13 nM	14–17%	0.8	–1.3	2–2.5 h	2.5 h	MAO-A	25, 50, 100 mg
Zolmitriptan	Zomig	Grünenthal	5-HT_{1B/D}	0.63 nM	40%	1.6	–0.7	1.5–2 h	2–3 h	MAO-A; CYP1A2	2.5, 5 mg
Naratriptan	Amerge	GSK	5-HT_{1B/D}	5.0 nM	70%	2.2	–0.2	2–3 h	6 h	Many CYPs; MAO-A	1, 2.5 mg
Rizatriptan	Maxalt	Merck	5-HT_{1B/D}	20 nM	45%	1.4	–0.7	1–1.5 h	2–2.5 h	MAO-A	5, 10 mg
Almotriptan	Axert	Almirall- Prodesfarma	5-HT_{1B/D} 5-HT_{1F}	16 nM	70%	1.6	+0.35	2.5 h	3.6 h	CYP2D6; CYP3A4; MAO-A	6.25, 12.5 mg
Eletriptan	Relpax	Pfizer	5-HT_{1B/D} 5-HT_{1F}	1.3 nM	50%	3.9	+0.5	1–2 h	3.6–5.5 h	CYP3A4	20, 40, 80 mg
Frovatriptan	Frova	Vernalis	5-HT_{1B/D}	4.0 nM	24–30%	0.9	–1.53	2–4 h	26 h	CYP1A2	2.5 mg

Zolmitriptan is different from the other triptans because it is converted to an active N-desmethyl metabolite which has higher affinity for the serotonin 5-HT_{1D} and 5-HT_{1B} receptors; both substances have a biological half-life of 2 to 3 hours. In studies, newer triptans are mostly compared to sumatriptan. They are better than sumatriptan for their longer half-life in plasma and higher oral bioavailability, but have a higher potential for central nervous side effects.

Donitriptan and avitriptan were never marketed.

== Chemistry ==
Chemical structures of triptans and related compounds
Serotonin	Dimethyltryptamine	Sumatriptan
Rizatriptan	Naratriptan	Eletriptan
Donitriptan	Almotriptan	Frovatriptan
Avitriptan	Zolmitriptan	LY-334370
LY-344864	L-694247	IS-159

Triptans are either tryptamines or closely related compounds. Most triptans are simple tryptamines. These include sumatriptan, rizatriptan, donitriptan, almotriptan, zolmitriptan, and L-694247. Certain triptans, including eletriptan, frovatriptan, and LY-344864, are cyclized tryptamines. Other triptans, including naratriptan, LY-334370, and avitriptan, are not technically tryptamines, although they are still closely related to tryptamines. Naratriptan and LY-334370 are piperidinylindoles rather than tryptamines, while avitriptan features a cyclized propylamine side chain instead of the ethylamine side chain present in tryptamines. A number of triptans, including sumatriptan, rizatriptan, eletriptan, almotriptan, zolmitriptan, contain the psychedelic drug dimethyltryptamine (DMT) within their chemical structures and hence are derivatives of DMT. Triptans may be thought of as synthetic analogues of the monoamine neurotransmitter serotonin (5-hydroxytryptamine; 5-HT). Another triptan-like drug is IS-159.

== History ==
The history of triptans began with the proposed existence of then unknown serotonin (5-hydroxytryptamine, 5-HT). In the late 1940s two groups of investigators, one in Italy and the other in the United States, identified a substance that was called serotonin in the US and enteramine in Italy. In the early 1950s it was confirmed that both substances were the same. In the mid-1950s it was proposed that serotonin had a role as a neurotransmitter in the central nervous system (CNS) of animals. Investigations of the mechanism of action were not very successful as experimental techniques were lacking.

Later in the 1960s, studies showed that vasoconstriction caused by 5-HT, noradrenaline and ergotamine could reduce migraine attacks. Patrick P.A. Humphrey among others at Glaxo started researching the 5-HT receptor to discover a more direct 5-HT agonist with fewer side effects.

They continued developing and working on a desirable action on 5-HT by 5-HT_{1} receptor activation for an anti-migraine drug. Continued work led to the development of sumatriptan, now known as the first 5-HT_{1} agonist, selective for the 5-HT_{1D/B} receptors and also the 5-HT_{1F} receptor with less affinity. By 1991 sumatriptan became available in clinical use in the Netherlands and in the US in 1993. However, there was always a debate about its mechanism of action, and it still remains unclear today. Later, Mike Moskowitz proposed a theory about "neuronal extravasation", and this was the first clue that sumatriptan might have a direct neuronal effect in migraine attacks.

Sumatriptan became a prototype for other triptans that have been developed for improved selectivity for the 5-HT_{1D/B} receptors.

== Society and culture ==
=== Legal status ===
These drugs have been available only by prescription (US, Canada and UK), but sumatriptan became available over-the-counter in the UK in June 2006. The brand name of the OTC product in the UK is Imigran Recovery. The patent on Imitrex STATDose expired in December 2006, and injectable sumatriptan became available as a generic formula in August 2008. Sumavel Dosepro is a needle-free delivery of injectable sumatriptan that was approved in the US by the FDA in July 2009. Sumatriptan became available as a generic in the US in late 2009. It used to be sold over-the-counter in Romania under the Imigran brand; however, as of August 2014 prescription is required. Zecuity, a sumatriptan transdermal patch, was approved by the US FDA in January 2013. The sumatriptan nasal powder was approved by the FDA in January 2016 and became available in the U.S. May 2016. Naratriptan is available OTC in Germany and Brazil.
