= Alpha-2C adrenergic receptor =

Protein-coding gene in the species Homo sapiens

ADRA2C
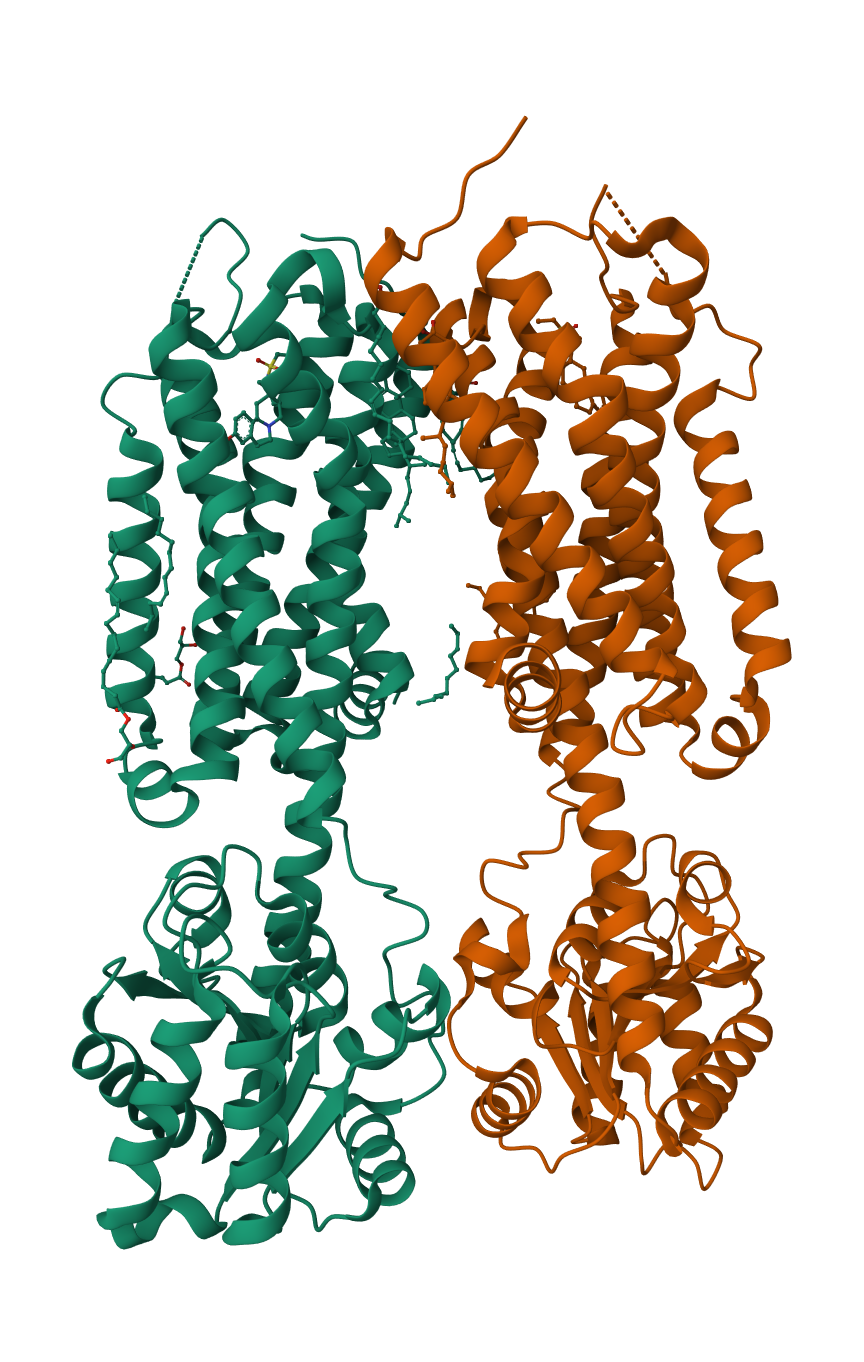

Identifiers
- Aliases: ADRA2C, ADRA2L2, ADRA2RL2, ADRARL2, ALPHA2CAR, adrenoceptor alpha 2C
- External IDs: MGI: 87936; GeneCards: ADRA2C

Gene location (Human)
| Chr. | Chromosome 4 (human) |
| Band | 4p16.3 | Start | 3,766,348 bp |
| Band | 4p16.3 | End | 3,768,526 bp |

Gene location (Mouse)
| Chr. | Chromosome 5 (mouse) |
| Band | 5 B2|5 18.09 cM | Start | 35,435,663 bp |
| Band | 5 B2|5 18.09 cM | End | 35,439,107 bp |
RNA expression pattern
| Bgee | Human / Mouse (ortholog); Top expressed in: decidua; canal of the cervix; Descending thoracic aorta; ascending aorta; popliteal artery; tibial arteries; saphenous vein; vena cava; right coronary artery; Skeletal muscle tissue of rectus abdominis / Top expressed in: lumbar spinal ganglion; nucleus accumbens; epithelium of lens; perirhinal cortex; entorhinal cortex; CA3 field; dorsal striatum; superior frontal gyrus; Region I of hippocampus proper; retinal pigment epithelium; More reference expression data |
| BioGPS | n/a |
Gene ontology
| Molecular function | G protein-coupled receptor activity; epinephrine binding; protein homodimerization activity; signal transducer activity; adrenergic receptor activity; protein binding; alpha-2A adrenergic receptor binding; alpha2-adrenergic receptor activity; protein heterodimerization activity |
| Cellular component | cytoplasm; axon terminus; integral component of membrane; endosome; membrane; plasma membrane; integral component of plasma membrane; axon; glutamatergic synapse; integral component of postsynaptic membrane; integral component of postsynaptic density membrane; soma |
| Biological process | G protein-coupled receptor signaling pathway; activation of protein kinase B activity; negative regulation of epinephrine secretion; regulation of sensory perception of pain; regulation of smooth muscle contraction; regulation of insulin secretion; female pregnancy; cell-cell signaling; negative regulation of norepinephrine secretion; negative regulation of uterine smooth muscle contraction; adenylate cyclase-activating adrenergic receptor signaling pathway; regulation of vasoconstriction; positive regulation of neuron differentiation; positive regulation of vasoconstriction; signal transduction; platelet activation; positive regulation of MAPK cascade; adrenergic receptor signaling pathway; receptor transactivation; adenylate cyclase-modulating G protein-coupled receptor signaling pathway |
Sources:Amigo / QuickGO
Orthologs
| Databases | NCBI: entry; OMA: entry |
| Species | Human | Mouse |
| Entrez | 152 | 11553 |
| Ensembl | ENSG00000184160 | ENSMUSG00000045318 |
| UniProt | P18825 | Q01337 |
| RefSeq (mRNA) | NM_000683 | NM_007418 |
| RefSeq (protein) | NP_000674 | NP_031444 |
| Location (UCSC) | Chr 4: 3.77 – 3.77 Mb | Chr 5: 35.44 – 35.44 Mb |
| PubMed search |
- Wikidata
| View/Edit Human | View/Edit Mouse |

The alpha-2C adrenergic receptor (α_{2C} adrenoceptor), also known as ADRA2C, is an alpha-2 adrenergic receptor, and also denotes the human gene encoding it.

== Receptor ==
Alpha-2-adrenergic receptors include 3 highly homologous subtypes: alpha_{2A}, alpha_{2B}, and alpha_{2C}. These receptors have a critical role in regulating neurotransmitter release from sympathetic nerves and from adrenergic neurons in the central nervous system. Studies in mice revealed that both the alpha_{2A} and alpha_{2C} subtypes were required for normal presynaptic control of transmitter release from sympathetic nerves in the heart and from central noradrenergic neurons; the alpha_{2A} subtype inhibited transmitter release at high stimulation frequencies, whereas the alpha_{2C} subtype modulated neurotransmission at lower levels of nerve activity.

== Gene ==
This gene encodes the alpha2C subtype, which contains no introns in either its coding or untranslated sequences.

== Ligands ==
=== Agonists ===
- (R)-3-Nitrobiphenyline (also weak antagonist at α_{2A} and α_{2B})

=== Antagonists ===
- BMY 7378 (also α_{1D} antagonist)
- Brexpiprazole
- JP-1302: selective over α2A, α2B, α2C
- N-{2-[4-(2,3-dihydro-benzo[1,4]dioxin-2-ylmethyl)-[1,4]diazepan-1-yl]-ethyl}-2-phenoxy-nicotinamide
- Pirepemat
- Quetiapine
- Risperidone
- Mirtazapine
- Mianserin
- Spiroxatrine
- Yohimbine derivatives 9 and 10: >43 fold selectivity over α2A, α2B and α1 subtypes

== See also ==
- Adrenergic receptor
