= 5-HT1E receptor =

Protein-coding gene in the species Homo sapiens

HTR1E

Identifiers
- Aliases: HTR1E, 5-HT1E, 5-HT1E receptor, 5-hydroxytryptamine receptor 1E
- External IDs: OMIM: 182132; GeneCards: HTR1E

Gene location (Human)
Chr.	Chromosome 6 (human)
Band	6q14.3	Start	86,937,528 bp
Band	6q14.3	End	87,016,679 bp
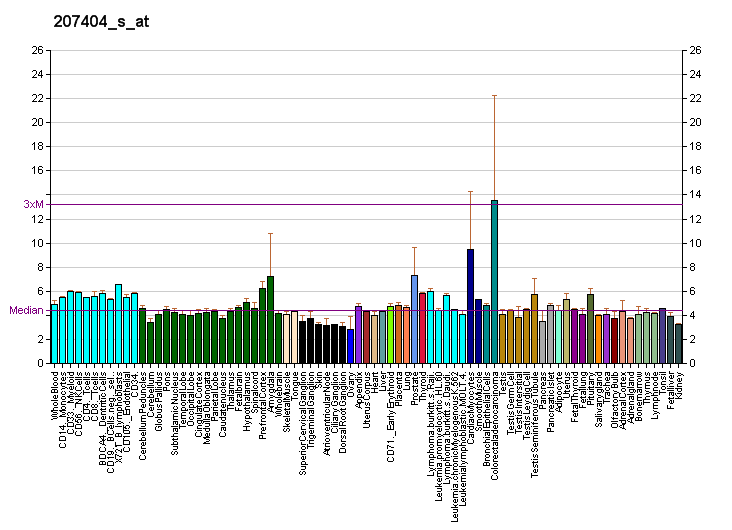
RNA expression pattern
Bgee	Human / Mouse (ortholog); Top expressed in: gonad; testicle; prefrontal cortex; Brodmann area 9; Brodmann area 46; right frontal lobe; cingulate gyrus; anterior cingulate cortex; nucleus accumbens; superior frontal gyrus / n/a; More reference expression data
BioGPS	More reference expression data
Gene ontology
Molecular function	G protein-coupled receptor activity; signal transducer activity; serotonin binding; G protein-coupled serotonin receptor activity; neurotransmitter receptor activity; protein binding
Cellular component	integral component of membrane; plasma membrane; integral component of plasma membrane; membrane; dendrite
Biological process	G protein-coupled receptor signaling pathway; G protein-coupled receptor signaling pathway, coupled to cyclic nucleotide second messenger; adenylate cyclase-inhibiting G protein-coupled receptor signaling pathway; signal transduction; chemical synaptic transmission; G protein-coupled serotonin receptor signaling pathway
Sources:Amigo / QuickGO
Orthologs
Databases	NCBI: entry; OMA: entry
Species	Human	Mouse
Entrez	3354	n/a
Ensembl	ENSG00000168830	n/a
UniProt	P28566	n/a
RefSeq (mRNA)	NM_000865	n/a
RefSeq (protein)	NP_000856	n/a
Location (UCSC)	Chr 6: 86.94 – 87.02 Mb	n/a
PubMed search		n/a
- Wikidata
View/Edit Human

5-hydroxytryptamine (serotonin) 1E receptor (5-HT_{1E}) is a highly expressed human G-protein coupled receptor that belongs to the 5-HT_{1} receptor family (G_{i}-coupled serotonin receptor). The human gene is denoted as HTR1E.

== Function ==
The function of the 5-HT_{1E} receptor is unknown due to the lack of selective pharmacological tools, specific antibodies, and permissive animal models. The 5-HT_{1E} receptor gene lacks polymorphisms amongst humans (few mutations), indicating a high degree of evolutionary conservation of genetic sequence, which suggests that the 5-HT_{1E} receptor has an important physiological role in humans. It is hypothesized that the 5-HT_{1E} receptor is involved in the regulation of memory in humans due to the high abundance of receptors in the frontal cortex, hippocampus, and olfactory bulb, all of which are regions of the brain integral to memory regulation.

This receptor is unique among the serotonin receptors in that it is not known to be expressed by rats or mouse species, all of which lack the gene encoding the 5-HT_{1E} receptor. However the genomes of the pig, rhesus monkey, and several lagomorphs (including rabbit) as well as the guinea pig each encode a homologous 5-HT_{1E} receptor gene. The guinea pig is the most likely candidate for future study of 5-HT_{1E} receptor function in vivo. The expression of 5-HT_{1E} receptors in the guinea pig brain has been pharmacologically confirmed; 5-HT_{1E} receptor expression patterns of the human and guinea pig brains appear to be similar. In the human cortex, the expression of 5-HT_{1E} undergoes a marked transition during adolescence, in a way that is strongly correlated with the expression of 5-HT_{1B}.

The most closely related receptor to the 5-HT_{1E} is the 5-HT_{1F} receptor. They share 57% amino acid sequence homology and have some pharmacological characteristics in common. Both receptors are G_{i}-coupled (inhibit adenylate cyclase activity) and both receptors have high affinities for 5-HT and low affinities for 5-carboxyamidotryptaine and mesulergine. However, due to major differences in brain expression patterns, these receptors are unlikely to mediate similar functions in humans. For example, 5-HT_{1E} receptors are abundant in the hippocampus but are not detectable in the striatum (caudate and putamen of the human brain), while the opposite is true for the 5-HT_{1F} receptor. Thus, conclusions about the function of the 5-HT_{1E} receptor cannot be ascribed to the function of the 5-HT_{1F} receptor, and vice versa.

== Selective ligands ==
No highly selective 5-HT_{1E} ligands are available yet. [^{3}H]5-HT remains the only radioligand available with high affinity for the 5-HT_{1E} receptor (5nM).

=== Agonists ===
- BRL-54443 (5-Hydroxy-3-(1-methylpiperidin-4-yl)-1H-indole) - mixed 5-HT_{1E/1F} agonist

=== Antagonists ===
None as yet.

== See also ==
- 5-HT_{1} receptor
- 5-HT receptor
