= Fentanyl/fluanisone =

Combination drug

Combination of
- Fentanyl: Opioid analgesic
- Fluanisone: Typical antipsychotic

Clinical data
- Trade names: Hypnorm
- Pregnancy category: N/A
- Routes of administration: Injection
- ATCvet code: QN02AB73 (WHO)

Legal status
- Legal status: Veterinary use only

Identifiers
- CAS Number: 52869-98-4

Fentanyl/fluanisone (trade name Hypnorm) is a veterinary combination drug consisting of fentanyl (a potent synthetic narcotic analgesic with a rapid onset and short duration of action) and fluanisone (a typical antipsychotic and sedative of the butyrophenone class) for use in mice, rats, rabbits and guinea pigs.

== See also ==
- Hydrocodone/paracetamol
- Hydrocodone/ibuprofen
- Oxycodone/paracetamol
- Oxycodone/aspirin
- Oxycodone/naloxone
- Morphine/naltrexone
