= List of veterinary drugs =

This article lists veterinary pharmaceutical drugs alphabetically by name. Many veterinary drugs have more than one name and, therefore, the same drug may be listed more than once.

Abbreviations are used in the list as follows:

- INN = International Nonproprietary Name
- BAN = British Approved Name
- USAN = United States Adopted Name

== A ==
- acepromazine – sedative, tranquilizer, and antiemetic
- afoxolaner - antiparasitic
- albendazole - anthelminthic
- alphaxolone - hypnotic/sedative
- alprazolam – benzodiazepine used as an anxiolytic and tranquilizer
- altrenogest – used to synchronizes estrus
- amantadine – analgesic for chronic pain
- aminophylline – bronchodilator
- amitraz – antiparasitic
- amitriptyline – tricyclic antidepressant used to treat separation anxiety, excessive grooming dogs and cats
- amlodipine – calcium channel blocker used to decrease blood pressure
- amoxicillin – antibacterial
- apomorphine – emetic (used to induce vomiting)
- artificial tears – lubricant eye drops used as a tear supplement
- atenolol – treats cardiac arrhythmias, hypertension, and diabetes plus other cardiovascular disorders
- atipamezole – α_{2}-adrenergic antagonist used to reverse the sedative and analgesic effects of alpha-2 adrenergic receptor agonists

Azathioprine (Imuran, Azasan): This medication is an immune-suppressing drug used to treat various autoimmune diseases in dogs.

== B ==
- bedinvetmab - nerve growth factor inhibitor monoclonal antibody used for osteoarthritis in dogs
- benazepril – ACE-inhibitor used in heart failure, hypertension, chronic kidney failure and protein-losing nephropathy
- bethanechol – stimulates bladder contractions, tranquilizer, makes the patient feel no pain
- bexagliflozin - oral antidiabetic medication
- bupivacaine – local anesthetic primarily utilized pre- and post-operatively
- buprenorphine – narcotic for pain relief in cats after surgery
- butorphanol – mu agonist/kappa antagonist, used as a cough suppressant and for a muscle relaxation effect in horses

== C ==
- carprofen – COX-2 selective NSAID used to relieve pain and inflammation in dogs and cats
- cefpodoxime – antibiotic
- cephalexin – antibiotic, particularly useful for susceptible Staphylococcus infections
- ciprofloxacin – antibiotic of quinolone group
- clamoxyquine – antiparasitic to treat salmonids for infection with the myxozoan parasite, Myxobolus cerebralis
- clavamox – antibiotic, used to treat skin and other infections
- clindamycin – antibiotic with particular use in dental infections with effects against most aerobic Gram-positive cocci, as well as muchenionoweloozi disorder.
- clomipramine – primarily used in dogs to treat behavioral problems

== D ==
- deracoxib – nonsteroidal anti-inflammatory drug (NSAID)
- dexamethasone – anti-inflammatory steroid
- diazepam – benzodiazepine used to treat status epilepticus, also used as a preanaesthetic and a sedative
- dichlorophene – fungicide, germicide, and antimicrobial agent, also used for the removal of parasites
- diphenhydramine – histamine blocker
- doxycycline – antibiotic, also used to treat Lyme disease

== E ==
- enalapril – ACE-inhibitor used to treat high blood pressure and heart failure
- enrofloxacin – Broad spectrum antibiotic (Gram-positive and -negative) -- not recommended for streptococci, or anaerobic bacteria
- equine chorionic gonadotropin – gonadotropic hormone used to induce ovulation in livestock prior to artificial insemination

== F ==
- fenbendazole – antiparasitic - another medication "febantel" is metabolized to fenbendazole
- fipronil – antiparasitic
- firocoxib - nonsteroidal anti-inflammatory drug used as an analgesic in horses
- flumazenil - reversal agent for benzodiazepines
- flunixin meglumine – nonsteroidal anti-inflammatory drug used as an analgesic and antipyretic in horses
- fluralaner - antiparasitic
- frunevetmab - nerve growth factor inhibitor monoclonal antibody used for osteoarthritis in cats
- furosemide – diuretic used to prevent exercise-induced pulmonary hemorrhage in horses

== G ==
- gabapentin – pain reliever
- gentamicin/betamethasone valerate/clotrimazole – combination drug product used to treat ear disease in dogs
- glycopyrrolate – emergency drug used for cardiac support
- grapiprant - non-cyclooxygenase inhibiting nonsteroidal anti-inflammatory drug (NSAID)

== H ==
- hydromorphone – opioid analgesic used as a premedication
- hydroxyzine – antihistamine drug used primarily for treatment of allergies

== I ==
- imidacloprid/moxidectin – antiparasitic
- isoxsuprine – vasodilator used for laminitis and navicular disease in horses
- ivermectin – a broad-spectrum antiparasitic used in horses, cattle, sheep, goats and dogs

== K ==
- ketamine – dissociative anesthetic and tranquilizer in cats, dogs, horses, and other animals
- ketoprofen – nonsteroidal anti-inflammatory drug (NSAID)

== L ==
- levamisole – antiparasitic
- levetiracetam – anti-convulsant used for seizures
- levothyroxine – used in the treatment of hypothyroidism
- lokivetmab -Anti IL31 monoclonal antibody used for atopic dermatitis in dogs
- lufenuron – insecticide used for flea control

== M ==
- marbofloxacin – antibiotic
- maropitant – antiemetic
- mavacoxib – nonsteroidal anti-inflammatory drug (NSAID)
- medetomidine – surgical anesthetic and analgesic
- meloxicam – nonsteroidal anti-inflammatory drug (NSAID)
- metacam – used to reduce inflammation and pain
- methimazole – used in treatment of hyperthyroidism
- methocarbamol - muscle relaxant used to reduce muscle spasms associated with inflammation, injury, intervertebral disc disease, and certain toxicities
- metoclopramide – potent antiemetic, secondarily as a prokinetic
- metronidazole – antibiotic against anaerobic bacteria
- milbemycin oxime – broad spectrum antiparasitic used as an anthelmintic, insecticide and miticide
- mirtazapine – antiemetic and appetite stimulant in cats and dogs
- mitratapide – used to help weight loss in dogs
- morphine – pure mu agonist/opioid analgesic used as a premedication
- moxifloxacin – antibiotic

== N ==
- neomycin – antibacterial
- nimesulide – nonsteroidal anti-inflammatory drug (NSAID)
- nitarsone – feed additive used in poultry to increase weight gain, improve feed efficiency, and prevent histomoniasis (blackhead disease)
- nitenpyram – insecticide
- nitroscanate – anthelmintic used to treat roundworms, hookworms and tapeworms
- nitroxynil – anthelmintic for fasciola and liver fluke infestations
- nystatin – antifungal

== O ==
- oclacitinib – antipruritic
- ofloxacin – fluoroquinolone antibiotic
- omeprazole – used for treatment and prevention of gastric ulcers in horses
- oxibendazole – anthelmintic
- oxymorphone – analgesic
- oxytetracycline – antibiotic

== P ==
- pentobarbital – humane euthanasia of animals not to be used for food
- pentoxyfylline – xanthine derivative used in as an antiinflammatory drug and in the prevention of endotoxemia
- pergolide – dopamine receptor agonist used for the treatment of pituitary pars intermedia dysfunction in horses
- phenobarbital – anti-convulsant used for seizures
- phenylbutazone – nonsteroidal anti-inflammatory drug (NSAID)
- phenylpropanolamine – controls urinary incontinence in dogs
- phenytoin/pentobarbital – animal euthanasia product containing phenytoin and pentobarbital
- pimobendan – phosphodiesterase 3 inhibitor used to manage heart failure in dogs
- pirlimycin – antimicrobial
- ponazuril – anticoccidial
- praziquantel – treatment of infestations of the tapeworms Dipylidium caninum, Taenia pisiformis, Echinococcus granulosus
- prazosin – sympatholytic used in hypertension and abnormal muscle contractions
- prednisolone – glucocorticoid (steroid) used in the management of inflammation and auto-immune disease, primarily in cats
- prednisone – glucocorticoid (steroid) used in the management of inflammation and auto immune disease
- pregabalin – neuropathic pain reliever and anti-convulsant
- propofol – short acting intravenous drug used to induce anesthesia
- pyrantel – effective against ascarids, hookworms and stomach worms

== R ==
- rafoxanide – antiparasitic
- rifampin – anti-microbial primarily used in conjunction with other erythromycin in the treatment of Rhodococcus equi infections in foals
- robenacoxib – nonsteroidal anti-inflammatory drug (NSAID)
- roxarsone – arsenical used as a coccidiostat and for increased weight gain

== S ==
- sarolaner - antiparasitic
- selamectin – antiparasitic treating fleas, roundworms, ear mites, heartworm, and hookworms
- silver sulfadiazine – antibacterial
- streptomycin – antibiotic used in large animals
- sucralfate – treats gastric ulcers
- sulfasalazine – anti-inflammatory and antirheumatic

== T ==
- Telazol – intravenous drug used to induce anesthesia; combination of tiletamine and zolazepam
- telmisartan - Angiotensin II receptor blocker
- tepoxalin – nonsteroidal anti-inflammatory drug (NSAID)
- theophylline – for bronchospasm and cardiogenic edema
- thiabendazole – antiparasitic
- thiostrepton – antibiotic
- tolfenamic acid — nonsteroidal anti-inflammatory drug (NSAID)
- tramadol – analgesic
- trazodone – antidepressant
- triamcinolone acetonide – corticosteroid
- trilostane – for canine Cushing's (hyperadrenocorticism) syndrome
- trimethoprim — used widely for bacterial infections, is in the family of sulfa drugs
- trimethoprim/sulfadoxine — antibacterial containing trimethoprim and sulfadoxine
- trimethoprim/sulfamethoxazole - antibacterial containing trimethoprim and sulfamethoxazole
- tylosin – antibiotic

== U ==
- ursodeoxycholic acid (INN) or ursodiol (USAN) — hydrophilic bile acid used to treat liver diseases

== V ==
- velagliflozin - oral antidiabetic medication

== X ==
- xylazine – α_{2}-adrenergic agonist, used to temporarily sedate animals

== Y ==
- yohimbine – used to reverse effects of xylazine, also called an "antidote" to xylazine

== Z ==
- zonisamide – anti-convulsant used for seizures
