= Oxycodone/aspirin =

Combination drug

Combination of
- Oxycodone: Opioid analgesic
- Aspirin: Non-steroidal anti-inflammatory drug

Clinical data
- Trade names: Percodan
- AHFS/Drugs.com: percodan
- License data: US FDA: Percodan
- Routes of administration: Oral
- ATC code: N02AJ18 (WHO)

Legal status
- Legal status: US: Schedule II

Identifiers
- CAS Number: 64336-56-7
- KEGG: D11176

Oxycodone/aspirin (trade name Percodan) is a combination drug marketed by Endo Pharmaceuticals. It is a tablet containing a mixture of 325 mg (5 grains) of aspirin and 4.8355 mg of oxycodone HCl (equivalent to 4.3346 mg of oxycodone as the free base); it is an opioid/non-opioid combination used to treat moderate to moderately severe pain. The safety of the combination during pregnancy has not been established, although aspirin is generally contraindicated during pregnancy, and the drug has been placed in pregnancy category D. Inactive ingredients include D&C Yellow 10, FD&C Yellow 6, microcrystalline cellulose, and corn starch. Percodan was first marketed by DuPont Pharmaceuticals and prescribed in the United States in 1950. Once a widely prescribed painkiller, it has largely been replaced by alternative oxycodone compounds containing paracetamol (acetaminophen) instead of aspirin, such as Percocet.

== Pharmacology ==
The oxycodone component in the combination is technically 14-hydroxy-7,8-dihydrocodein-6-one, a white odorless, crystalline powder which is synthesized from the opium alkaloid thebaine. Thebaine by itself has no therapeutic value. Oxycodone is metabolized into oxymorphone. Unlike morphine and like codeine, oxycodone has a good oral potency. Prior to the introduction of paracetamol, Percodan was the mainstay in post-operative oral pain treatment due to the potency and long half-life of oxycodone. It originally contained a small amount of caffeine.

== Reformulation ==
Percodan was reformulated in 2005; prior to 2005, it contained two oxycodone salts—4.62 mg of oxycodone hydrochloride and 0.38 mg of oxycodone terephthalate. Since the latter salt is unusual in the pharmacopeia, the manufacturer increased the amount of oxycodone hydrochloride to 4.8355 mg and discontinued the oxycodone terephthalate.

== History ==
Percodan was patented in 1953 by Mozes J. Lewenstein.

== Miscellaneous ==
The combination oxycodone/aspirin is also sold under the brand name Endodan. All products containing oxycodone (including Percodan, Percocet, OxyContin) have the potential to be habit-forming. Oxycodone can produce drug dependence of the morphine type and, therefore, has the potential for being addictive.

“Percodan” is mentioned in a 1990 version of the song, Pennyroyal Tea by Nirvana. It is implies the painkiller is being used to combat pain caused by “bad posture”. However, this line was not included in the final 1993 version recorded on the In Utero album. The band’s lead singer, Kurt Cobain, also admitted that he had taken the medication on recreational basis too.

== See also ==
- Embeda
- Hypnorm
- Percocet
- Targin
- Vicodin
- Vicoprofen
