= Oxycodone/ibuprofen =

Combination drug

Combination of
- Oxycodone: Opioid analgesic
- Ibuprofen: NSAID

Clinical data
- Trade names: Combunox
- Routes of administration: Oral
- ATC code: N02AJ19 (WHO)

Legal status
- Legal status: In general: ℞ (Prescription only)

Identifiers
- CAS Number: 701907-98-4
- KEGG: D11573

Oxycodone/ibuprofen (INNs, trade name Combunox) is an oral combination drug formulation of the opioid analgesic oxycodone and the nonsteroidal anti-inflammatory drug (NSAID) ibuprofen that is used in the treatment of chronic and acute pain. This particular drug is supplied in a fixed dose combination tablet which contains Oxycodone Hydrochloride, USP 5 mg with Ibuprofen, USP 400 mg.

== See also ==
- Oxycodone/paracetamol
- Oxycodone/aspirin
- Hydrocodone/ibuprofen
