= Ensaculin =

Chemical compound

Clinical data
- ATC code: none

Pharmacokinetic data
- Elimination half-life: 13.7 hours

Identifiers
- IUPAC name: 7-methoxy-6-[3-[4-(2-methoxyphenyl)piperazin-1-yl]propoxy]-3,4-dimethylchromen-2-one
- CAS Number: 155773-59-4
- PubChem CID: 208923
- ChemSpider: 181019
- UNII: 869PGR00AT
- ChEMBL: ChEMBL1963107
- CompTox Dashboard (EPA): DTXSID10870034

Chemical and physical data
- Formula: C_{26}H_{32}N_{2}O_{5}
- Molar mass: 452.551 g·mol^{−1}
- 3D model (JSmol): Interactive image
- SMILES: O=C/4Oc3cc(OC)c(OCCCN2CCN(c1ccccc1OC)CC2)cc3\C(=C\4C)C
- InChI: InChI=1S/C26H32N2O5/c1-18-19(2)26(29)33-23-17-24(31-4)25(16-20(18)23)32-15-7-10-27-11-13-28(14-12-27)21-8-5-6-9-22(21)30-3/h5-6,8-9,16-17H,7,10-15H2,1-4H3; Key:FQELZLMTAPJJOL-UHFFFAOYSA-N

Ensaculin (KA-672) is a drug from the coumarin family, which has been researched as a potential treatment for dementia. It acts on a number of receptor systems, being both a weak NMDA antagonist and a 5HT_{1A} agonist. Animal studies have shown promising nootropic effects, although efficacy in humans has yet to be proven. It was well tolerated in human trials, with the main side effect being orthostatic hypotension (low blood pressure upon standing).

== See also ==
- Enciprazine
- Mafoprazine
- BMY-14802
- Azaperone
- Fluanisone
