= C10H10N2O3 =

The molecular formula C_{10}H_{10}N_{2}O_{3} (molar mass: 206.20 g/mol) may refer to:

- Caroxazone
- Imidazole salicylate
- Paraxazone
