= C9H13N3 =

The molecular formula C_{9}H_{13}N_{3} (molar mass: 163.22 g/mol, exact mass: 163.1109 u) may refer to:

- Pyridinylpiperazine, or 1-(2-Pyridinyl)piperazine
- ABT-202
