= C16H21ClN4 =

The molecular formula C_{16}H_{21}ClN_{4} (molar mass: 304.82 g/mol, exact mass: 304.1455 u) may refer to:

- Enpiprazole
- Mepiprazole (Psigodal)
