= Celecoxib/tramadol =

Combination drug

Combination of
- Celecoxib: Nonsteroidal anti-inflammatory drug (NSAID)
- Tramadol hydrochloride: Opioid agonist

Clinical data
- Trade names: Seglentis
- Other names: E-58425
- License data: US DailyMed: Celecoxib_and_tramadol
- Routes of administration: By mouth
- ATC code: N02AJ16 (WHO)

Legal status
- Legal status: US: Schedule IV

Identifiers
- KEGG: D12491

Celecoxib/tramadol sold under the brand name Seglentis, is a fixed-dose combination of the anti-inflammatory celecoxib and the opioid tramadol used for the management and treatment of pain.

Developed by Spanish pharmaceutical company Esteve, it was approved for medical use in the United States in October 2021.
