= C11H15NO4 =

The molecular formula C_{11}H_{15}NO_{4} (molar mass: 225.24 g/mol) may refer to:

- Etilevodopa, a dopaminergic agent
- Morpholine salicylate, a nonsteroidal anti-inflammatory drug
