= BMY-14802 =

Chemical compound

Clinical data
- Other names: BMS-181100; MJ-14802
- ATC code: None

Identifiers
- IUPAC name: 1-(4-fluorophenyl)-4-[4-(5-fluoropyrimidin-2-yl)piperazin-1-yl]butan-1-ol
- CAS Number: 105565-56-8
- PubChem CID: 108046
- IUPHAR/BPS: 8
- ChemSpider: 97151
- UNII: A5NB5G07JO
- ChEMBL: ChEMBL60859
- CompTox Dashboard (EPA): DTXSID70909596

Chemical and physical data
- Formula: C_{18}H_{22}F_{2}N_{4}O
- Molar mass: 348.398 g·mol^{−1}
- 3D model (JSmol): Interactive image
- SMILES: c1cc(F)ccc1C(O)CCCN2CCN(CC2)c3ncc(F)cn3
- InChI: InChI=1S/C18H22F2N4O/c19-15-5-3-14(4-6-15)17(25)2-1-7-23-8-10-24(11-9-23)18-21-12-16(20)13-22-18/h3-6,12-13,17,25H,1-2,7-11H2; Key:ZXUYYZPJUGQHLQ-UHFFFAOYSA-N

BMY-14802, also known as BMS-181100, is a drug with antipsychotic effects which acts as both a sigma receptor antagonist and a 5-HT_{1A} receptor agonist. It also has affinity for the 5-HT_{2} and D_{4} receptors. The drug reached phase III clinical trials for the treatment of psychosis but was never marketed.

== Synthesis ==
Patent (Ex1/2/5/6/7):

The reaction of 4-chloro-4'-fluorobutyrophenone [3874-54-2] (1) with ethylene glycol gives the ketal, 2-(3-chloropropyl)-2-(4-fluorophenyl)-1,3-dioxolane [3308-94-9] (2). The reaction of 2-chloro-5-fluoro-4-methylthiopyrimidine [87789-51-3] (3) with N-carboethoxypiperazine [120-43-4] (4) gives ethyl-4-(5-fluoro-4-methylthio-2-pyrimidinyl)-1-piperazine carboxylate, PC10470079 (5). Catalytic hydrogenation removes the thiomethyl group giving ethyl-4-(5-fluoro-2-pyrimidinyl)-1-piperazine carboxylate [87789-52-4] (6). Acid hydrolysis of the carbamate protecting group gives a secondary amine and hence 5-fluoro-2-(piperazin-1-yl)pyrimidine [87789-49-9] (7). Alkylation of 2 with 7 and subsequent hydrolysis of the ketal protecting group afforded 1-(4-fluorophenyl)-4-(4-(5-fluoro-2-pyrimidinyl)-1-piperazinyl)butan-1-one [133982-66-8] (8). Lastly, reduction of the benzoyl ketone with sodium borohydride gave the alcohol, completing the synthesis of BMY-14802 (9).

== See also ==
- List of investigational antipsychotics
- Enciprazine
- Ensaculin
- Mafoprazine
- Azaperone
- Fluanisone
