= Salicylamide =

Chemical compound

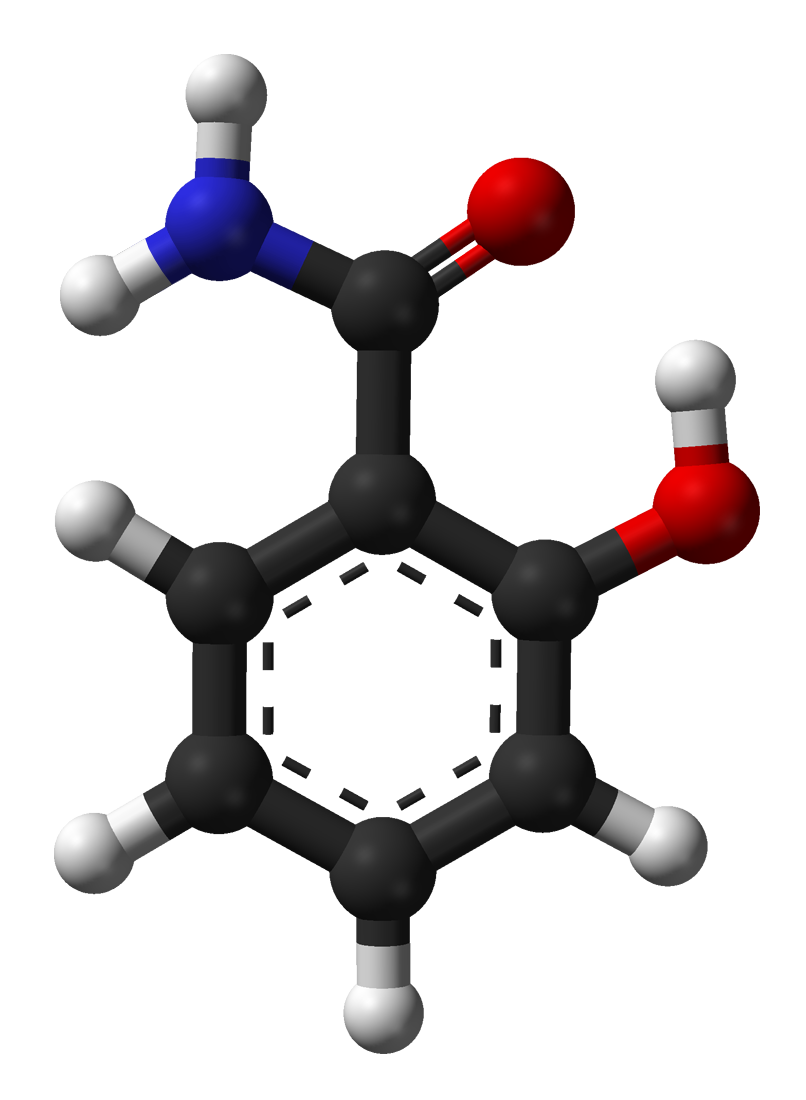

Clinical data
- MedlinePlus: a681004
- ATC code: N02BA05 (WHO) N02BA55 (WHO) (combinations)

Pharmacokinetic data
- Excretion: Renal

Identifiers
- IUPAC name: 2-Hydroxybenzamide
- CAS Number: 65-45-2
- PubChem CID: 5147
- DrugBank: DB08797
- ChemSpider: 4963
- UNII: EM8BM710ZC
- ChEBI: CHEBI:32114
- ChEMBL: ChEMBL27577
- NIAID ChemDB: 018403
- CompTox Dashboard (EPA): DTXSID3021726
- ECHA InfoCard: 100.000.554

Chemical and physical data
- Formula: C_{7}H_{7}NO_{2}
- Molar mass: 137.138 g·mol^{−1}
- 3D model (JSmol): Interactive image
- Density: 1.33 g/cm^{3}
- Solubility in water: Soluble in hot water, ether, alcohol, and chloroform. mg/mL (20 °C)
- SMILES: O=C(c1ccccc1O)N
- InChI: InChI=1S/C7H7NO2/c8-7(10)5-3-1-2-4-6(5)9/h1-4,9H,(H2,8,10); Key:SKZKKFZAGNVIMN-UHFFFAOYSA-N

Salicylamide (o-hydroxybenzamide or amide of salicyl) is a non-prescription drug with analgesic and antipyretic properties. Its medicinal uses are similar to those of aspirin. Salicylamide is used in combination with both aspirin and caffeine in the over-the-counter pain remedy PainAid. It was also an ingredient in the over-the-counter pain remedy BC Powder but was removed from the formulation in 2009, and Excedrin used the ingredient from 1960 to 1980 in conjunction with aspirin, acetaminophen, and caffeine. It was used in later formulations of Vincent's powders in Australia as a substitute for phenacetin.

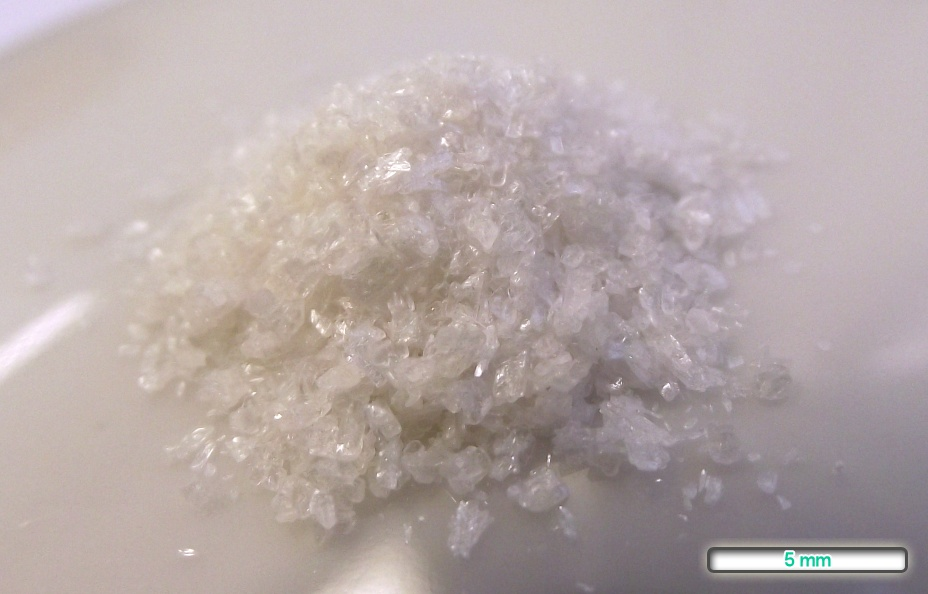
Pure salicylamide is a white or slightly pink crystalline powder

== Derivatives ==
Derivatives of salicylamide include ethenzamide, labetalol, medroxalol, otilonium, oxyclozanide, salicylanilide, niclosamide, and raclopride.

== See also ==
- 4-Aminosalicylic acid
- Mesalazine
- Salsalate
