= C14H20N2O3 =

The molecular formula C_{14}H_{20}N_{2}O_{3} (molar mass: 264.32 g/mol, exact mass: 264.1474 u) may refer to:

- Propacetamol
- Vorinostat, also known as suberanilohydroxamic acid
