= C14H10O5 =

The molecular formula C_{14}H_{10}O_{5} (molar mass: 258.23 g/mol, exact mass: 258.0528 u) may refer to:

- Alternariol
- Salsalate
