= C20H24N2O5 =

The molecular formula C_{20}H_{24}N_{2}O_{5} (molar mass: 372.41 g/mol, exact mass: 372.1685 u) may refer to:

- Codoxime
- Medroxalol
