= Pyridinylpiperazine =

Names
- Preferred IUPAC name 1-(Pyridin-2-yl)piperazine

Identifiers
CAS Number	34803-66-2
3D model (JSmol)	Interactive image
ChEMBL	ChEMBL18094
ChemSpider	85244
ECHA InfoCard	100.047.458
EC Number	252-220-3
PubChem CID	94459
UNII	5IO1HZP7ZN
CompTox Dashboard (EPA)	DTXSID90188341
- InChI: InChI=1S/C9H13N3/c1-2-4-11-9(3-1)12-7-5-10-6-8-12/h1-4,10H,5-8H2 Key: GZRKXKUVVPSREJ-UHFFFAOYSA-N; InChI=1S/C9H13N3/c1-2-4-11-9(3-1)12-7-5-10-6-8-12/h1-4,10H,5-8H2; InChI=1S/C9H13N3/c1-2-4-11-9(3-1)12-7-5-10-6-8-12/h1-4,10H,5-8H2 Key: GZRKXKUVVPSREJ-UHFFFAOYSA-N
- SMILES: n1ccccc1N2CCNCC2

Properties
Chemical formula	C_{9}H_{13}N_{3}
Molar mass	163.22 g/mol
- Except where otherwise noted, data are given for materials in their standard state (at 25 °C [77 °F], 100 kPa). verify (what is ?) Infobox references

1-(2-Pyridinyl)piperazine is a chemical compound and piperazine derivative. Some derivatives of this substance are known to act as potent and selective α_{2}-adrenergic receptor antagonists, such as 1-(3-fluoro-2-pyridinyl)piperazine.

A few pyridinylpiperazine derivatives are drugs, including:

- Azaperone — antipsychotic
- Atevirdine — antiretroviral
- Delavirdine — antiretroviral
- Mirtazapine — antidepressant

== See also ==
- Diphenylmethylpiperazine
- Benzylpiperazine
- Phenylpiperazine
- Pyrimidinylpiperazine
