= Enciprazine =

Chemical compound

Clinical data
- Other names: WY-48624; D-3112
- Routes of administration: Oral

Identifiers
- IUPAC name: 1-[4-(2-Methoxyphenyl)piperazin-1-yl]-3-(3,4,5-trimethoxyphenoxy)propan-2-ol
- CAS Number: 68576-86-3 68576-88-5
- PubChem CID: 50222
- ChemSpider: 34991993
- UNII: L6X660925G
- KEGG: D13112
- ChEMBL: ChEMBL101284
- CompTox Dashboard (EPA): DTXSID3057806

Chemical and physical data
- Formula: C_{23}H_{32}N_{2}O_{6}
- Molar mass: 432.517 g·mol^{−1}
- 3D model (JSmol): Interactive image
- SMILES: COC1=CC=CC=C1N2CCN(CC2)CC(COC3=CC(=C(C(=C3)OC)OC)OC)O
- InChI: InChI=1S/C23H32N2O6/c1-27-20-8-6-5-7-19(20)25-11-9-24(10-12-25)15-17(26)16-31-18-13-21(28-2)23(30-4)22(14-18)29-3/h5-8,13-14,17,26H,9-12,15-16H2,1-4H3; Key:KSQCNASWXSCJTD-UHFFFAOYSA-N

Enciprazine (INN, BAN; enciprazine hydrochloride (USAN); developmental code names WY-48624, D-3112) is an anxiolytic and antipsychotic of the phenylpiperazine class which was never marketed. It shows high affinity for the α_{1}-adrenergic receptor and 5-HT_{1A} receptor, among other sites. The drug was initially anticipated to produce ortho-methoxyphenylpiperazine (oMeOPP), a serotonin receptor agonist with high affinity for the 5-HT_{1A} receptor, as a significant active metabolite, but subsequent research found this not to be the case.

== Synthesis ==
ChemDrug Synthesis:

3,4,5-Trimethoxyphenol (antiarol, 1) is alkylated with epichlorohydrin (2) to give [(3,4,5-trimethoxyphenoxy)methyl]oxirane (3). Opening of the epoxide with o-anisyl-piperazine (4) completes the synthesis of enciprazine (5).

== See also ==
- Acaprazine
- Batoprazine
- Eltoprazine
- Enpiprazole
- Fluprazine
- Lidanserin
- Ensaculin
- Mafoprazine
- BMY-14802
- Azaperone
- Fluanisone
