= Glafenine =

Chemical compound

Clinical data
- ATC code: N02BG03 (WHO)

Identifiers
- IUPAC name: 2,3-Dihydroxypropyl 2-[(7-chloro-4-quinolinyl)amino]benzoate
- CAS Number: 3820-67-5
- PubChem CID: 3474
- ChemSpider: 3355
- UNII: 46HL4I09AH
- ChEBI: CHEBI:31653
- ChEMBL: ChEMBL146095
- CompTox Dashboard (EPA): DTXSID1048546
- ECHA InfoCard: 100.021.197

Chemical and physical data
- Formula: C_{19}H_{17}ClN_{2}O_{4}
- Molar mass: 372.81 g·mol^{−1}
- 3D model (JSmol): Interactive image
- Melting point: 169 to 170 °C (336 to 338 °F)
- SMILES: O=C(OCC(O)CO)c1ccccc1Nc2c3ccc(Cl)cc3ncc2
- InChI: InChI=1S/C19H17ClN2O4/c20-12-5-6-14-17(7-8-21-18(14)9-12)22-16-4-2-1-3-15(16)19(25)26-11-13(24)10-23/h1-9,13,23-24H,10-11H2,(H,21,22); Key:GWOFUCIGLDBNKM-UHFFFAOYSA-N

Glafenine is a nonsteroidal anti-inflammatory drug (NSAID). Use of glafenine is limited due to the risk of anaphylaxis and acute kidney failure.

== See also ==
- Floctafenine, a chemically related NSAID
