= Relfovetmab =

Veterinary medication

Monoclonal antibody
- Type: Whole antibody
- Target: Nerve growth factor (NGF)

Clinical data
- Trade names: Portela
- Other names: ZTS-00084768
- Routes of administration: Subcutaneous
- ATCvet code: QN02BG92 (WHO)

Legal status
- Legal status: CA: ℞-only; EU: Rx-only

Identifiers
- CAS Number: 2171034-70-9
- UNII: MPR0ERS9LT

Chemical and physical data
- Formula: C_{6580}H_{10118}N_{1760}O_{2038}S_{46}
- Molar mass: 147964.37 g·mol^{−1}

Relfovetmab, sold under the brand name Portela, is a felinized monoclonal antibody for the alleviation of pain associated with osteoarthritis in cats. Relfovetmab targets nerve growth factor. Nerve growth factor binds to TrkA receptors located on immune cells to elicit the release of additional proinflammatory mediators, including nerve growth factor itself. These inflammatory mediators lead to further peripheral sensitization involved in pain perception. The inhibition of nerve growth factor was demonstrated to provide relief from pain associated with osteoarthritis.

Relfovetmab was authorized for veterinary use in the European Union in October 2025, and in Canada in December 2025.

== Medical uses ==
Relfovetmab is indicated for the alleviation of pain associated with osteoarthritis in cats.

== Society and culture ==
=== Legal status ===
In September 2025, the Committee for Veterinary Medicinal Products of the European Medicines Agency adopted a positive opinion, recommending the granting of a marketing authorization for the veterinary medicinal product Portela, solution for injection, intended for cats. The applicant for this veterinary medicinal product is Zoetis Belgium. Relfovetmab was authorized for veterinary use in the European Union in October 2025.

Relfovetmab was authorized for veterinary use in Canada in December 2025.

=== Names ===
Relfovetmab is the international nonproprietary name.

Relfovetmab is sold under the brand name Portela.
