= Potassium salicylate =

Names
- Preferred IUPAC name Potassium 2-hydroxybenzoate

Identifiers
CAS Number	578-36-9
3D model (JSmol)	Interactive image
ChemSpider	10877
ECHA InfoCard	100.008.566
EC Number	209-421-6
PubChem CID	23664627
UNII	K91YT16P5M
CompTox Dashboard (EPA)	DTXSID9060366
- InChI: InChI=1S/C7H6O3.K/c8-6-4-2-1-3-5(6)7(9)10;/h1-4,8H,(H,9,10);/q;+1/p-1
- SMILES: [K+].O=C([O-])c1ccccc1O

Properties
Chemical formula	C_{7}H_{5}KO_{3}
Molar mass	194.227 g/mol (monohydrate); 176.212 g/mol (anhydrous)
Melting point	29 °C (84 °F) (monohydrate, decomposes)
Solubility in water	18.07 mol % @ 100 °C (212 °F)

Pharmacology
ATC code	N02BA12 (WHO)
- Except where otherwise noted, data are given for materials in their standard state (at 25 °C [77 °F], 100 kPa). Infobox references

Potassium salicylate is the potassium salt of salicylic acid. It exists as the monohydrate KC_{7}H_{5}O_{3}·H_{2}O below 29 °C (84 °F), where it decomposes to the anhydrous form (KC_{7}H_{5}O_{3}).
