= Guacetisal =

Chemical compound

Clinical data
- Trade names: Broncaspin; Balsacetil; Guaiaspir; Prontomucil
- Other names: Aspirin guaiacol ester; O-Methoxyphenyl salicylate acetate
- ATC code: N02BA14 (WHO)

Identifiers
- IUPAC name: 2-Methoxyphenyl 2-acetoxybenzoate
- CAS Number: 55482-89-8
- PubChem CID: 68749
- ChemSpider: 61994
- UNII: T6EKB9V2O2
- ChEMBL: ChEMBL2105097
- CompTox Dashboard (EPA): DTXSID40204060
- ECHA InfoCard: 100.054.221

Chemical and physical data
- Formula: C_{16}H_{14}O_{5}
- Molar mass: 286.283 g·mol^{−1}
- 3D model (JSmol): Interactive image
- Melting point: 72 to 74.5 °C (161.6 to 166.1 °F)
- SMILES: O=C(Oc1ccccc1C(=O)Oc2ccccc2OC)C
- InChI: InChI=1S/C16H14O5/c1-11(17)20-13-8-4-3-7-12(13)16(18)21-15-10-6-5-9-14(15)19-2/h3-10H,1-2H3; Key:HSJFYRYGGKLQBT-UHFFFAOYSA-N

Guacetisal is a drug that has been used to treat inflammatory respiratory diseases. Chemically, it is an ester resulting from the combination of aspirin and guaiacol.
