= Izenivetmab =

Veterinary medication

Monoclonal antibody
- Type: Whole antibody
- Target: Nerve growth factor (NGF)

Clinical data
- Trade names: Lenivia
- Other names: ZTS-00075623
- Routes of administration: Subcutaneous
- ATCvet code: QN02BG93 (WHO)

Legal status
- Legal status: CA: ℞-only; EU: Rx-only

Identifiers
- CAS Number: 2447755-72-6
- UNII: UR46CWR8UW

Chemical and physical data
- Formula: C_{6570}H_{10078}N_{1750}O_{2022}S_{48}
- Molar mass: 147472.00 g·mol^{−1}

Izenivetmab, sold under the brand name Lenivia, is a canine monoclonal antibody medication used for the alleviation of pain associated with osteoarthritis in dogs.

Izenivetmab was authorized for veterinary use in Canada in October 2025, and in the European Union in November 2025.

== Medical uses ==
Izenivetmab is indicated for the alleviation of pain associated with osteoarthritis in dogs.

== Society and culture ==
=== Legal status ===
Izenivetmab was authorized for veterinary use in Canada in October 2025, and in the European Union in November 2025.

=== Names ===
Izenivetmab is the international nonproprietary name.

Izenivetmab is sold under the brand name Lenivia.
