= Acaprazine =

Chemical compound

Clinical data
- Routes of administration: Oral
- ATC code: none

Legal status
- Legal status: In general: uncontrolled

Identifiers
- IUPAC name: N-[3-[4-(2,5-Dichlorophenyl)piperazin-1-yl]propyl]acetamide
- CAS Number: 55485-20-6
- PubChem CID: 176864
- ChemSpider: 154038
- UNII: F2S6Z4SB8T
- ChEMBL: ChEMBL2104046
- CompTox Dashboard (EPA): DTXSID60204062

Chemical and physical data
- Formula: C_{15}H_{21}Cl_{2}N_{3}O
- Molar mass: 330.25 g·mol^{−1}
- 3D model (JSmol): Interactive image
- SMILES: CC(=O)NCCCN1CCN(CC1)C2=C(C=CC(=C2)Cl)Cl
- InChI: InChI=1S/C15H21Cl2N3O/c1-12(21)18-5-2-6-19-7-9-20(10-8-19)15-11-13(16)3-4-14(15)17/h3-4,11H,2,5-10H2,1H3,(H,18,21); Key:SGYVNBUUTWSSJC-UHFFFAOYSA-N

Acaprazine (INN) is an anxiolytic and "adrenolytic" drug of the phenylpiperazine group that was never marketed.

== See also ==
- Enciprazine
- Enpiprazole
- Lorpiprazole
- Mepiprazole
- Tolpiprazole
