= Dipyrocetyl =

Chemical compound

Clinical data
- Trade names: Movirene; Artromialgina
- Other names: 2,3-Bis(acetyloxy)benzoic acid; o-Pyrocatechuic acid diacetate; Diacetylpyrocatechol-3-carboxylic acid
- ATC code: N02BA09 (WHO)

Identifiers
- IUPAC name: 2,3-Diacetoxybenzoic acid
- CAS Number: 486-79-3
- PubChem CID: 68093
- ChemSpider: 61404
- UNII: EF5UVE254C
- ChEMBL: ChEMBL1451173
- CompTox Dashboard (EPA): DTXSID9045976
- ECHA InfoCard: 100.006.947

Chemical and physical data
- Formula: C_{11}H_{10}O_{6}
- Molar mass: 238.195 g·mol^{−1}
- 3D model (JSmol): Interactive image
- Melting point: 148 to 150 °C (298 to 302 °F)
- Solubility in water: Insoluble mg/mL (20 °C)
- SMILES: O=C(Oc1cccc(c1OC(=O)C)C(=O)O)C
- InChI: InChI=1S/C11H10O6/c1-6(12)16-9-5-3-4-8(11(14)15)10(9)17-7(2)13/h3-5H,1-2H3,(H,14,15); Key:NYIZXMGNIUSNKL-UHFFFAOYSA-N

Dipyrocetyl is a pharmaceutical drug used as an analgesic and antipyretic.
