= Dimetotiazine =

Chemical compound

Clinical data
- Other names: Dimethothiazine
- AHFS/Drugs.com: International Drug Names
- Routes of administration: By mouth
- ATC code: N02CX05 (WHO)

Legal status
- Legal status: In general: ℞ (Prescription only)

Identifiers
- IUPAC name: 10-(2-Dimethylaminopropyl)-N,N-dimethylphenothiazine-2-sulfonamide
- CAS Number: 7456-24-8
- PubChem CID: 3089
- DrugBank: DB08967
- ChemSpider: 2979
- UNII: 1FTA475ZDB
- KEGG: D07854
- CompTox Dashboard (EPA): DTXSID6023076
- ECHA InfoCard: 100.028.390

Chemical and physical data
- Formula: C_{19}H_{25}N_{3}O_{2}S_{2}
- Molar mass: 391.55 g·mol^{−1}
- 3D model (JSmol): Interactive image
- SMILES: CC(CN1C2=CC=CC=C2SC3=C1C=C(C=C3)S(=O)(=O)N(C)C)N(C)C
- InChI: InChI=1S/C19H25N3O2S2/c1-14(20(2)3)13-22-16-8-6-7-9-18(16)25-19-11-10-15(12-17(19)22)26(23,24)21(4)5/h6-12,14H,13H2,1-5H3; Key:VWNWVCJGUMZDIU-UHFFFAOYSA-N

Dimetotiazine (INN) is a phenothiazine drug used for the treatment of migraine. It is a serotonin antagonist and histamine antagonist.
