= Lorpiprazole =

Chemical compound

Clinical data
- Routes of administration: Oral
- ATC code: none

Legal status
- Legal status: In general: uncontrolled

Identifiers
- IUPAC name: (5aR,8aS)-3-(2-{4-[3-(trifluoromethyl)phenyl]piperazin-1-yl}ethyl)-5,5a,6,7,8,8a-hexahydrocyclopenta[3,4]pyrrolo[2,1-c][1,2,4]triazole
- CAS Number: 108785-69-9
- PubChem CID: 3045380
- ChemSpider: 16736802
- UNII: 0M14O7T47Q

Chemical and physical data
- Formula: C_{21}H_{26}F_{3}N_{5}
- Molar mass: 405.469 g·mol^{−1}
- 3D model (JSmol): Interactive image
- SMILES: FC(F)(F)c1cc(ccc1)N5CCN(CCc4nnc2n4C[C@@H]3CCC[C@H]23)CC5

Lorpiprazole (INN; brand name Normarex) is an anxiolytic drug of the phenylpiperazine group. It has been described as a serotonin antagonist and reuptake inhibitor (SARI) in the same group as trazodone, nefazodone, and etoperidone.

== See also ==
- Acaprazine
- Enpiprazole
- Mepiprazole
- Tolpiprazole
