= Rimazolium =

Chemical compound

Clinical data
- ATC code: N02BG02 (WHO)

Identifiers
- IUPAC name: 3-(Ethoxycarbonyl)-1,6-dimethyl-4-oxo-6,7,8,9-tetrahydro-4H-pyrido[1,2-a]pyrimidin-1-ium
- CAS Number: 35615-72-6 28610-84-6 (mesylate)
- PubChem CID: 71940
- ChemSpider: 64949
- UNII: 967Y95129A
- CompTox Dashboard (EPA): DTXSID20865436
- ECHA InfoCard: 100.047.844

Chemical and physical data
- Formula: C_{13}H_{19}N_{2}O_{3}
- Molar mass: 251.306 g·mol^{−1}
- 3D model (JSmol): Interactive image
- Melting point: 165 to 166 °C (329 to 331 °F) (mesylate)
- SMILES: O=C1C(=C/[N+](=C2\N1C(CCC2)C)C)\C(=O)OCC
- InChI: InChI=1S/C13H19N2O3/c1-4-18-13(17)10-8-14(3)11-7-5-6-9(2)15(11)12(10)16/h8-9H,4-7H2,1-3H3/q+1; Key:JOWRFSPJFXLGGY-UHFFFAOYSA-N

Rimazolium is a non-narcotic analgesic. It is usually formulated as the mesylate salt, rimazolium metilsufate.
