= Ethenzamide =

NSAID analgesic drug

Clinical data
- ATC code: N02BA07 (WHO)

Identifiers
- IUPAC name: 2-ethoxybenzamide
- CAS Number: 938-73-8
- PubChem CID: 3282
- ChemSpider: 3167
- UNII: L929ZCK4BF
- KEGG: D01466
- ChEMBL: ChEMBL1483877
- CompTox Dashboard (EPA): DTXSID4020581
- ECHA InfoCard: 100.012.133

Chemical and physical data
- Formula: C_{9}H_{11}NO_{2}
- Molar mass: 165.192 g·mol^{−1}
- 3D model (JSmol): Interactive image
- SMILES: O=C(c1ccccc1OCC)N
- InChI: InChI=1S/C9H11NO2/c1-2-12-8-6-4-3-5-7(8)9(10)11/h3-6H,2H2,1H3,(H2,10,11); Key:SBNKFTQSBPKMBZ-UHFFFAOYSA-N

Ethenzamide (2-ethoxybenzamide) is a common analgesic and anti-inflammatory drug that is used for the relief of fever, headaches, and other minor aches and pains. It is also an ingredient in numerous cold medications and many prescription analgesics. It is used as an over-the-counter drug in Japan, often in combination with caffeine and acetaminophen, where it is marketed for uses including toothache, menstrual cramps, headache, and fever.

It is metabolized in vivo into salicylamide.
