= C15H16O2 =

The molecular formula C_{15}H_{16}O_{2} (molar mass: 228.29 g/mol, exact mass: 228.1150 u) may refer to:

- Bisphenol A (BPA)
- Nabumetone
