= ATC code N02 =

ATC code N02 Analgesics is a therapeutic subgroup of the Anatomical Therapeutic Chemical Classification System, a system of alphanumeric codes developed by the World Health Organization (WHO) for the classification of drugs and other medical products. Subgroup N02 is part of the anatomical group N Nervous system.

Codes for veterinary use (ATCvet codes) can be created by placing the letter Q in front of the human ATC code: for example, QN02. ATCvet codes without corresponding human ATC codes are cited with the leading Q in the following list.
National versions of the ATC classification may include additional codes not present in this list, which follows the WHO version.

== N02A Opioids ==
=== N02AA Natural opium alkaloids ===
N02AA01 Morphine
N02AA02 Opium
N02AA03 Hydromorphone
N02AA04 Nicomorphine
N02AA05 Oxycodone
N02AA08 Dihydrocodeine
N02AA10 Papaveretum
N02AA11 Oxymorphone
N02AA51 Morphine, combinations
N02AA53 Hydromorphone and naloxone
N02AA55 Oxycodone and naloxone
N02AA56 Oxycodone and naltrexone
N02AA58 Dihydrocodeine, combinations
N02AA59 Codeine, combinations excluding psycholeptics
N02AA79 Codeine, combinations with psycholeptics

=== N02AB Phenylpiperidine derivatives ===
N02AB01 Ketobemidone
N02AB02 Pethidine
N02AB03 Fentanyl
N02AB52 Pethidine, combinations excluding psycholeptics
QN02AB53 Fentanyl, combinations excluding psycholeptics
N02AB72 Pethidine, combinations with psycholeptics
QN02AB73 Fentanyl, combinations with psycholeptics

=== N02AC Diphenylpropylamine derivatives ===
N02AC01 Dextromoramide
N02AC03 Piritramide
N02AC04 Dextropropoxyphene
N02AC05 Bezitramide
N02AC52 Methadone, combinations excluding psycholeptics
N02AC54 Dextropropoxyphene, combinations excluding psycholeptics
N02AC74 Dextropropoxyphene, combinations with psycholeptics
QN02AC90 Methadone

=== N02AD Benzomorphan derivatives ===
N02AD01 Pentazocine
N02AD02 Phenazocine
N02AD51 Pentazocine and naloxone

=== N02AE Oripavine derivatives ===
N02AE01 Buprenorphine
QN02AE90 Etorphine
QN02AE99 Oripavine derivatives, combinations

=== N02AF Morphinan derivatives ===
N02AF01 Butorphanol
N02AF02 Nalbuphine

=== N02AG Opioids in combination with antispasmodics ===
N02AG01 Morphine and antispasmodics
N02AG02 Ketobemidone and antispasmodics
N02AG03 Pethidine and antispasmodics
N02AG04 Hydromorphone and antispasmodics

=== N02AJ Opioids in combination with non-opioid analgesics ===
N02AJ01 Dihydrocodeine and paracetamol
N02AJ02 Dihydrocodeine and acetylsalicylic acid
N02AJ03 Dihydrocodeine and other non-opioid analgesics
N02AJ06 Codeine and paracetamol
N02AJ07 Codeine and acetylsalicylic acid
N02AJ08 Codeine and ibuprofen
N02AJ09 Codeine and other non-opioid analgesics
N02AJ13 Tramadol and paracetamol
N02AJ14 Tramadol and dexketoprofen
N02AJ15 Tramadol and other non-opioid analgesics
N02AJ16 Tramadol and celecoxib
N02AJ17 Oxycodone and paracetamol
N02AJ18 Oxycodone and acetylsalicylic acid
N02AJ19 Oxycodone and ibuprofen
N02AJ22 Hydrocodone and paracetamol
N02AJ23 Hydrocodone and ibuprofen

=== N02AX Other opioids ===
N02AX01 Tilidine
N02AX02 Tramadol
N02AX03 Dezocine
N02AX05 Meptazinol
N02AX06 Tapentadol
N02AX07 Oliceridine
N02AX51 Tilidine and naloxone

== N02B Other analgesics and antipyretics ==
=== N02BA Salicylic acid and derivatives ===
N02BA01 Acetylsalicylic acid
N02BA02 Aloxiprin
N02BA03 Choline salicylate
N02BA04 Sodium salicylate
N02BA05 Salicylamide
N02BA06 Salsalate
N02BA07 Ethenzamide
N02BA08 Morpholine salicylate
N02BA09 Dipyrocetyl
N02BA10 Benorilate
N02BA11 Diflunisal
N02BA12 Potassium salicylate
N02BA14 Guacetisal
N02BA15 Carbasalate calcium
N02BA16 Imidazole salicylate
N02BA51 Acetylsalicylic acid, combinations excluding psycholeptics
N02BA55 Salicylamide, combinations excluding psycholeptics
N02BA57 Ethenzamide, combinations excluding psycholeptics
N02BA59 Dipyrocetyl, combinations excluding psycholeptics
N02BA65 Carbasalate calcium combinations excluding psycholeptics
N02BA67 Magnesium salicylate, combinations excluding psycholeptics
N02BA71 Acetylsalicylic acid, combinations with psycholeptics
N02BA75 Salicylamide, combinations with psycholeptics
N02BA77 Ethenzamide, combinations with psycholeptics
N02BA79 Dipyrocetyl, combinations with psycholeptics

=== N02BB Pyrazolones ===
N02BB01 Phenazone
N02BB02 Metamizole
N02BB03 Aminophenazone
N02BB04 Propyphenazone
N02BB05 Nifenazone
N02BB51 Phenazone, combinations excluding psycholeptics
N02BB52 Metamizole sodium, combinations excluding psycholeptics
N02BB53 Aminophenazone, combinations excluding psycholeptics
N02BB54 Propyphenazone, combinations excluding psycholeptics
N02BB71 Phenazone, combinations with psycholeptics
N02BB72 Metamizole sodium, combinations with psycholeptics
N02BB73 Aminophenazone, combinations with psycholeptics
N02BB74 Propyphenazone, combinations with psycholeptics

=== N02BE Anilides ===
N02BE01 Paracetamol
N02BE03 Phenacetin
N02BE04 Bucetin
N02BE05 Propacetamol
N02BE51 Paracetamol, combinations excluding psycholeptics
N02BE53 Phenacetin, combinations excluding psycholeptics
N02BE54 Bucetin, combinations excluding psycholeptics
N02BE71 Paracetamol, combinations with psycholeptics
N02BE73 Phenacetin, combinations with psycholeptics
N02BE74 Bucetin, combinations with psycholeptics

=== N02BF Gabapentinoids ===
N02BF01 Gabapentin
N02BF02 Pregabalin
N02BF03 Mirogabalin

=== N02BG Other analgesics and antipyretics ===
N02BG02 Rimazolium
N02BG03 Glafenine
N02BG04 Floctafenine
N02BG05 Viminol
N02BG06 Nefopam
N02BG07 Flupirtine
N02BG08 Ziconotide
N02BG09 Methoxyflurane
N02BG10 Cannabinoids (includes nabiximols)
N02BG12 Tanezumab
QN02BG90 Frunevetmab
QN02BG91 Bedinvetmab
QN02BG92 Relfovetmab
QN02BG93 Izenivetmab

== N02C Antimigraine preparations ==
=== N02CA Ergot alkaloids ===
N02CA01 Dihydroergotamine
N02CA02 Ergotamine
N02CA04 Methysergide
N02CA07 Lisuride
N02CA51 Dihydroergotamine, combinations
N02CA52 Ergotamine, combinations excluding psycholeptics
N02CA72 Ergotamine, combinations with psycholeptics

=== N02CB Corticosteroid derivatives ===
N02CB01 Flumedroxone

=== N02CC Selective serotonin (5-HT_{1}) agonists ===
N02CC01 Sumatriptan
N02CC02 Naratriptan
N02CC03 Zolmitriptan
N02CC04 Rizatriptan
N02CC05 Almotriptan
N02CC06 Eletriptan
N02CC07 Frovatriptan
N02CC08 Lasmiditan
N02CC51 Sumatriptan and naproxen

=== N02CD Calcitonin gene-related peptide (CGRP) antagonists ===
N02CD01 Erenumab
N02CD02 Galcanezumab
N02CD03 Fremanezumab
N02CD04 Ubrogepant
N02CD05 Eptinezumab
N02CD06 Rimegepant
N02CD07 Atogepant
N02CD08 Zavegepant

=== N02CX Other antimigraine preparations ===
N02CX01 Pizotifen
N02CX02 Clonidine
N02CX03 Iprazochrome
N02CX05 Dimetotiazine
N02CX06 Oxetorone
