= Tolpiprazole =

Chemical compound

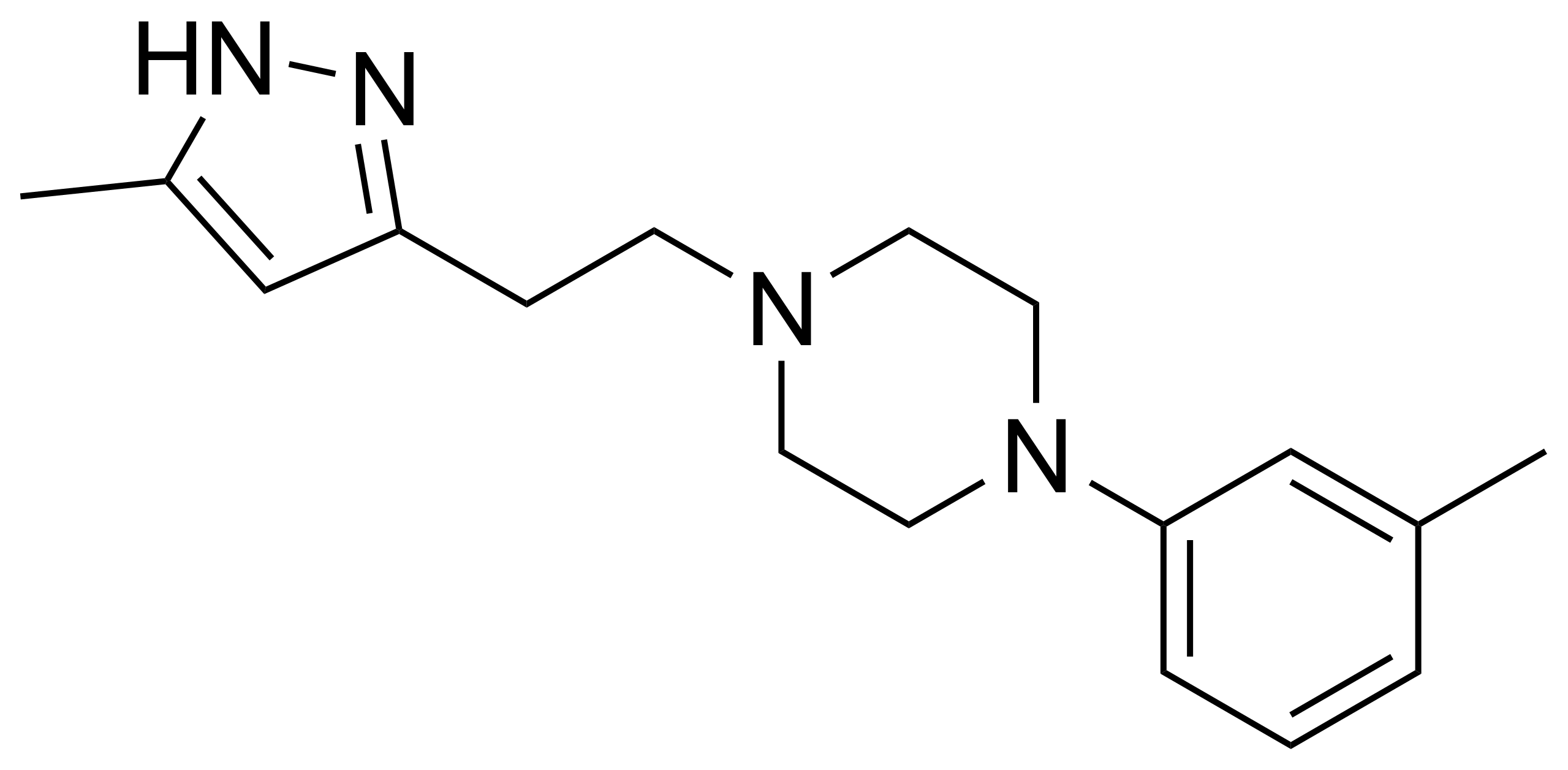

Clinical data
- Routes of administration: Oral
- ATC code: none

Legal status
- Legal status: In general: uncontrolled

Identifiers
- IUPAC name: 1-(3-Methylphenyl)-4-[2-(5-methyl-1H-pyrazol-3-yl)ethyl]piperazine
- CAS Number: 20326-13-0
- PubChem CID: 3084338
- ChemSpider: 2341419
- UNII: 8XP74P4HO3
- CompTox Dashboard (EPA): DTXSID90174224

Chemical and physical data
- Formula: C_{17}H_{24}N_{4}
- Molar mass: 284.407 g·mol^{−1}
- 3D model (JSmol): Interactive image
- SMILES: Cc3cccc(N2CCN(CCc1cc(C)[nH]n1)CC2)c3

Tolpiprazole (INN, BAN) (developmental code name H-4170) is an anxiolytic drug of the phenylpiperazine group that was never marketed.

== See also ==
- Acaprazine
- Enpiprazole
- Lorpiprazole
- Mepiprazole
