= Iprazochrome =

Chemical compound

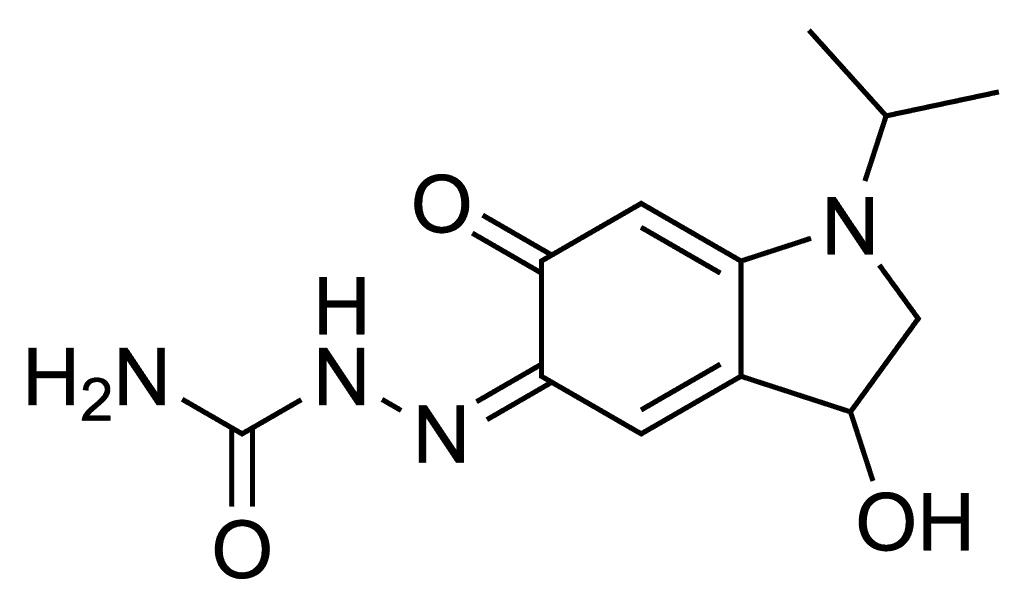

Clinical data
- Trade names: Divascan
- Other names: [(3-hydroxy-1-isopropyl-6-oxo-2,3-dihydroindol-5-ylidene)amino]urea
- AHFS/Drugs.com: International Drug Names
- ATC code: N02CX03 (WHO)

Identifiers
- IUPAC name: 3-hydroxy-1-isopropylindoline-5,6-dione 5-semicarbazone
- CAS Number: 7248-21-7
- PubChem CID: 6381821
- ChemSpider: 4903581
- UNII: 903A9K181P
- KEGG: D07297
- ChEMBL: ChEMBL2104324
- CompTox Dashboard (EPA): DTXSID70864030

Chemical and physical data
- Formula: C_{12}H_{16}N_{4}O_{3}
- Molar mass: 264.285 g·mol^{−1}
- 3D model (JSmol): Interactive image
- SMILES: CC(C)N1CC(C2=C/C(=N/NC(=O)N)/C(=O)C=C21)O
- InChI: InChI=1S/C12H16N4O3/c1-6(2)16-5-11(18)7-3-8(14-15-12(13)19)10(17)4-9(7)16/h3-4,6,11,18H,5H2,1-2H3,(H3,13,15,19)/b14-8-; Key:XZKVIDLLLOUTSS-ZSOIEALJSA-N

Iprazochrome is an antimigraine agent used for prophylaxis of the attacks. It is also indicated for diabetic retinopathy (both treatment and prevention in people with type-2 diabetes).

Chemically, it is a derivative of adrenochrome, which is a product of adrenaline oxidation. And it is a derivative of carbazochrome as well.

== Mechanism of action ==
It is a serotonin antagonist both in vitro and in vivo (it is a 5-HT_{2D} receptor antagonist). It also neutralises other vasoactive compounds such as bradykinin, histamine, and others.

This drug decreases the permeability and fragility of blood vessels, which reduces the number of migraine days and attenuates the symptoms associated with this condition, but it does not eliminate them altogether.

In animal models, iprazochrome was shown not to decrease the spreading depression velocity, which is a feature of other antimigraine agents and is thought to be one of the essential causes of classical migraines.

== Dose ==
For migraines, 1-3 tabletes (each tablet contains 2.5 mg of iprazochrome) are taken three times a day. An abortive medication is recommended in the first weeks of treatment.

For diabetic retinopaty, 2 tablets are taken three times a day. If the initial treatment was successful, it can be reduced to 1 tablet three times a day.

The effect of this medication is usually seen after a month. It's achieves its full efficacy after 3 months of treatment.

== Side effects ==
It can work as an anorectic and can cause skin allergic reactions after discontinuing.

This drug was also shown to induce pain in patients with atypical facial pain.

== Pharmacokinetics ==
=== Absorption ===
After taking the drug on empty stomach, it is rapidly absorbed. Peak serum concentration (C_{max}) is achieved after 1 hour, but its effect on blood vessels is seen only after 3 hours.

=== Elimination ===
The half-life of iprazochrome is 2.2 hours. It is metabolised renally and 20% is eliminated in an unchanged form.

There are two known metabolites of iprazochrome: an indole derivative (detected in urine) and a 6-hydroxy derivative (detected in feces).
