= Oxycodone/naloxone =

Combination pain relief drug

Combination of
- Oxycodone: Opioid analgesic
- Naloxone: Opioid receptor antagonist

Clinical data
- Trade names: Targin, Targiniq, Targinact, others
- AHFS/Drugs.com: International Drug Names; UK Drug Information
- License data: US DailyMed: Oxycodone hydrochloride/naloxone hydrochloride
- Pregnancy category: AU: C
- Routes of administration: By mouth
- ATC code: N02AA55 (WHO)

Legal status
- Legal status: AU: S8 (Controlled drug); CA: Schedule I; UK: POM (Prescription only); US: Schedule II; In general: ℞ (Prescription only)

Identifiers
- CAS Number: 92522-88-8

Oxycodone/naloxone, sold under the brand name Targin among others, is a combination pain medication available as modified-release tablets administered by mouth.

The oxycodone component is an opioid and is responsible for the pain-relieving effects. Naloxone, an opioid antagonist, opposes the effects of opioids but is poorly absorbed into the blood stream when administered orally; therefore, most of the dose remains in the gastrointestinal tract. This local presence reduces opioid-induced constipation by preventing oxycodone from binding to gut opioid receptors, without diminishing overall analgesic efficacy compared to oxycodone alone. A 2008 study demonstrated a significant reduction in constipation. Oxycodone/naloxone was released in 2014 in the United States, in 2006 in Germany, and has been available in some other European countries since 2009. In the United Kingdom, the 10 mg oxycodone / 5 mg naloxone and 20 mg / 10 mg strengths were approved in December 2008, and the 40 mg / 20 mg and 5 mg / 10 mg strengths received approval in July 2019.

Preliminary evidence suggests that oxycodone/naloxone may be an effective treatment for severe, refractory restless legs syndrome if first-line therapies have not been effective.
