= Medroxalol =

Chemical compound

Identifiers
- IUPAC name: 5-(2-{[4-(1,3-Benzodioxol-5-yl)-2-butanyl]amino}-1-hydroxyethyl)-2-hydroxybenzamide
- CAS Number: 56290-94-9
- PubChem CID: 41835
- ChemSpider: 38173
- UNII: 7PX96289JA
- CompTox Dashboard (EPA): DTXSID30866550
- ECHA InfoCard: 100.054.618

Chemical and physical data
- Formula: C_{20}H_{24}N_{2}O_{5}
- Molar mass: 372.421 g·mol^{−1}
- 3D model (JSmol): Interactive image
- SMILES: O=C(N)c1cc(ccc1O)C(O)CNC(C)CCc2ccc3OCOc3c2
- InChI: InChI=1S/C20H24N2O5/c1-12(2-3-13-4-7-18-19(8-13)27-11-26-18)22-10-17(24)14-5-6-16(23)15(9-14)20(21)25/h4-9,12,17,22-24H,2-3,10-11H2,1H3,(H2,21,25); Key:MPQWSYJGFLADEW-UHFFFAOYSA-N

Medroxalol is a vasodilator beta blocker also classified as a mixed receptor blocker as it blocks both alpha and beta receptors.

== Synthesis ==
Medroxalol synthesis:

For the first step, salicylamide (1) is the subject of a Friedel-Crafts acetylation and then the aromatic methyl ketone is halogenated. in the usual manner. The bromide in 2 is then displaced by the nitrogen in N-benzyl-1-(3',4'-methylenedioxyphenyl)-3-butylamine (3), which is itself prepared by reductive amination on the corresponding ketone. The product of the last step (4) is catalytically hydrogenated. This serves the dual purpose both of reducing the ketone and removing the benzyl protecting group affording the product medroxalol (5). Note that a benzyl protecting group is not necessarily used.

== See also ==
- Labetalol
