= Mepiprazole =

Chemical compound

Clinical data
- Trade names: Psigodal
- Other names: PAP; EMD-16923; H-4007
- Routes of administration: Oral
- Drug class: Serotonin antagonist and reuptake inhibitor (SARI); Serotonin 5-HT_{2A} receptor antagonist; α_{1}-Adrenergic receptor antagonist; Serotonin–norepinephrine–dopamine reuptake inhibitor (SNDRI)
- ATC code: none

Legal status
- Legal status: In general: ℞ (Prescription only)

Identifiers
- IUPAC name: 1-(3-Chlorophenyl)-4-[2-(5-methyl-1H-pyrazol-3-yl)ethyl]piperazine
- CAS Number: 20326-12-9 20344-15-4 (hydrochloride)
- PubChem CID: 71897
- ChemSpider: 64909
- UNII: 977BAL0NR7
- CompTox Dashboard (EPA): DTXSID30174223

Chemical and physical data
- Formula: C_{16}H_{21}ClN_{4}
- Molar mass: 304.82 g·mol^{−1}
- 3D model (JSmol): Interactive image
- SMILES: Cc3cc(CCN2CCN(c1cccc(Cl)c1)CC2)n[nH]3

Mepiprazole (INN, BAN; brand name Psigodal) is an anxiolytic drug of the phenylpiperazine group with additional antidepressant properties that is marketed in Spain. It acts as a 5-HT_{2A} and α_{1}-adrenergic receptor antagonist and inhibits the reuptake and induces the release of serotonin, dopamine, and norepinephrine to varying extents, and has been described as a serotonin antagonist and reuptake inhibitor (SARI).

== Uses ==
Controlled clinical trials of mepiprazole in patients with irritable bowel syndrome (IBS) were also carried out and suggested some benefits of the drug in relieving symptoms of IBS in some patients. Similarly to other phenylpiperazines like trazodone, nefazodone, and etoperidone, mepiprazole produces mCPP as an active metabolite.

== See also ==
- Acaprazine
- Enpiprazole
- Lorpiprazole
- Tolpiprazole
