= ABT-202 =

Chemical compound

Identifiers
- IUPAC name: (R)-1-(Pyridin-3-yl)pyrrolidin-3-amine
- CAS Number: 309959-34-0
- PubChem CID: 39220800
- ChemSpider: 16397614
- UNII: RJ89CX560B

Chemical and physical data
- Formula: C_{9}H_{13}N_{3}
- Molar mass: 163.224 g·mol^{−1}
- 3D model (JSmol): Interactive image
- SMILES: N[C@@H]1CCN(C2=CC=CN=C2)C1
- InChI: InChI=1S/C9H13N3/c10-8-3-5-12(7-8)9-2-1-4-11-6-9/h1-2,4,6,8H,3,5,7,10H2/t8-/m1/s1; Key:LVGMMVAWLISWJD-MRVPVSSYSA-N

ABT-202 is a drug developed by Abbott, which acts as an agonist at neural nicotinic acetylcholine receptors and has been researched for use as an analgesic, although it has not passed clinical trials.
