= Gentamicin/betamethasone valerate/clotrimazole =

Combination drug used in veterinary medicine

Combination of
- Gentamicin: Antibiotic
- Betamethasone valerate: Glucocorticoid
- Clotrimazole: Antifungal

Clinical data
- Trade names: Otomax

Identifiers
- CAS Number: 150523-34-5

Gentamicin/betamethasone valerate/clotrimazole is a fixed dose combination veterinary drug, sold under the trade name Otomax. It is a suspension for otic use in dogs. The active ingredients are gentamicin, betamethasone valerate and clotrimazole.

This drug product is used for treatment of acute external otitis. It is also used for the treatment of short term exacerbation of acute signs of chronic external otitis of bacterial and fungal origin due to bacteria susceptibility to gentamicin. This includes bacteria such asStaphylococcus intermedius and fungi susceptible to clotrimazole, in particular Malassezia pachydermatis.

The normal treatment is twice daily for a duration of seven days. The dosage amount varies and should be as prescribed by a veterinarian.

Otomax is a prescription medication only licensed for use in dogs.
