= Frunevetmab =

Feline medication for arthritis

Monoclonal antibody
- Type: Whole antibody
- Source: Rat
- Target: Nerve growth factor (NGF)

Clinical data
- Trade names: Solensia
- License data: US DailyMed: Frunevetmab
- Routes of administration: Subcutaneous
- ATCvet code: QN02BG90 (WHO)

Legal status
- Legal status: CA: ℞-only; US: ℞-only; EU: Rx-only

Identifiers
- CAS Number: 1708936-80-4
- UNII: 77O28MCS79
- KEGG: D10935

Frunevetmab, sold under the brand name Solensia, is a monoclonal antibody used to treat pain associated with osteoarthritis in cats. It is the first monoclonal antibody drug approved by the US Food and Drug Administration for animal use. Frunevetmab is the international nonproprietary name.

== Clinical usage ==
Frunevetmab is a cat-specific monoclonal antibody (a type of protein) designed to recognize and attach to a protein called nerve growth factor that is involved in the regulation of pain. When frunevetmab binds to nerve growth factor, it prevents the pain signal from reaching the brain.

Frunevetmab is indicated for the alleviation of pain associated with osteoarthritis in cats.

The most common side effects seen in cats include vomiting, diarrhea, injection site pain, scabbing on the head and neck, dermatitis, and pruritus (itchy skin).

== History ==
In February 2021, frunevetmab was approved for medical use in the European Union.

In January 2022, frunevetmab was approved for medical use in the United States.

Development as a potential drug for humans was stopped due to risk concerns over worsening osteoarthritis.

== General and cited references ==
- Gruen ME, Myers JA, Lascelles BD (2021). "Efficacy and Safety of an Anti-nerve Growth Factor Antibody (Frunevetmab) for the Treatment of Degenerative Joint Disease-Associated Chronic Pain in Cats: A Multisite Pilot Field Study". Frontiers in Veterinary Science. 8 610028. doi:10.3389/fvets.2021.610028. PMC 8195238. PMID 34124212.

Attribution
