= Nerve growth factor inhibitor =

- Drug class

Class identifiers
- Use: Osteoarthritis
- Biological target: Neurotrophin pathway

Legal status

Nerve growth factor (NGF) inhibitors are a class of compounds that inhibit the action of the neurotrophin nerve growth factor by targeting NGF molecules or NGF receptors. NGF inhibitors have demonstrated therapeutic potential in treatment of certain chronic pain disorders, including osteoarthritis, and chronic lower back pain. Two NGF inhibitors (tanezumab, and fasinumab) are undergoing clinical trials as potential treatments for pain disorders.

== Medical uses ==
=== Osteoarthritis ===
In clinical studies, NGF inhibitors have demonstrated efficacy in reducing pain and improving function in persons with knee or hip osteoarthritis. While injectable NGF inhibitors (anti-NGF antibodies) have demonstrated greater efficacy in pain relief compared to NSAID and opioid medications, those receiving the treatment were more likely to experience rapid progression of the disease, necessitating surgical treatment (especially if also taking NSAIDs concurrently).

== Mechanism of action ==
NGF is involved in pain signalling. The exact role of NGF signalling in chronic pain is not fully understood, and multiple mechanisms are thought to be involved. NGF is released by immune cells in response to peripheral injury, and is thought to promote neural sensitisation, and neural sprouting. Elevated NGF levels are seen in those with chronic pain conditions (including interstitial cystitis, prostatitis, arthritis, pancreatitis, chronic headaches, cancer pain, and diabetic neuropathy), and injection of NGF causes allodynia and hyperalgesia.

NGF inhibitors may take the form of monoclonal antibodies that bind to NGF, or small molecule inhibitors of NGF receptors. NGF inhibition may be achieved by sequestering free NGF molecules, blocking receptor binding, or inhibiting receptor function. Anti-NGF antibodies have demonstrated the greatest promise as potential medications.
