= Propacetamol =

Chemical compound

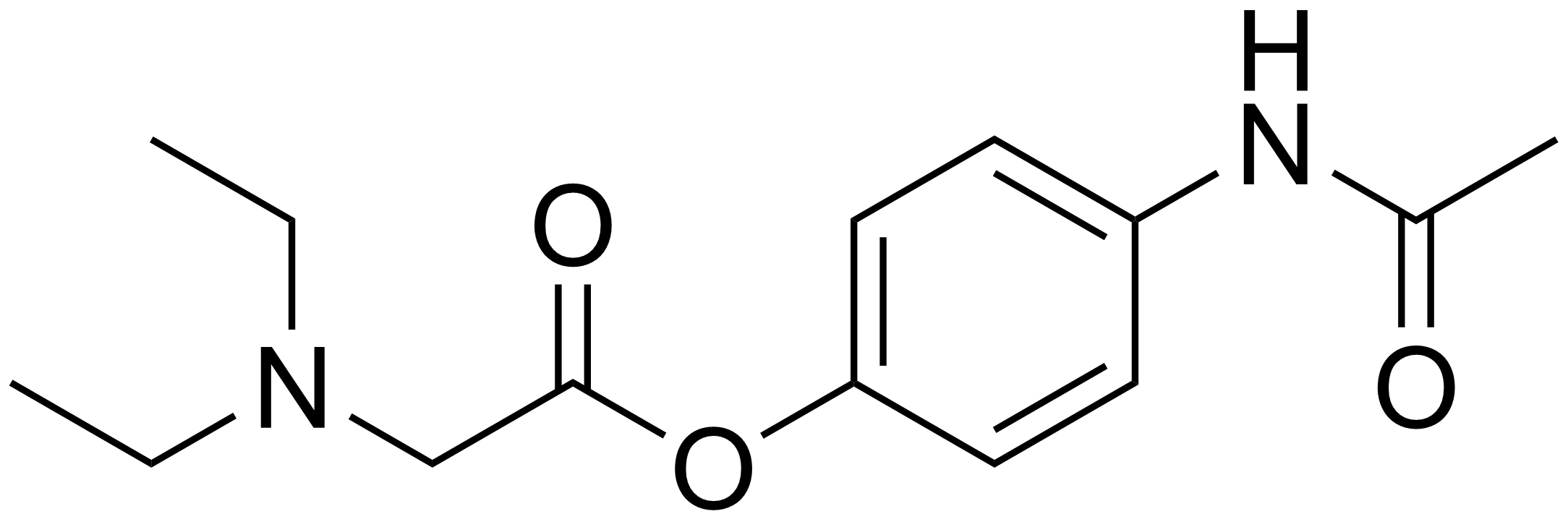

Clinical data
- AHFS/Drugs.com: International Drug Names
- Routes of administration: IV
- ATC code: N02BE05 (WHO)

Pharmacokinetic data
- Elimination half-life: 2.4 hours
- Excretion: Renal

Identifiers
- IUPAC name: 4-(acetamido)phenyl N,N-diethylglycinate
- CAS Number: 66532-85-2
- PubChem CID: 68865
- ChemSpider: 62097
- UNII: 5CHW4JMR82
- CompTox Dashboard (EPA): DTXSID3057800
- ECHA InfoCard: 100.060.336

Chemical and physical data
- Formula: C_{14}H_{20}N_{2}O_{3}
- Molar mass: 264.325 g·mol^{−1}
- 3D model (JSmol): Interactive image
- SMILES: CCN(CC)CC(=O)OC1=CC=C(C=C1)NC(=O)C
- InChI: InChI=1S/C14H20N2O3/c1-4-16(5-2)10-14(18)19-13-8-6-12(7-9-13)15-11(3)17/h6-9H,4-5,10H2,1-3H3,(H,15,17); Key:QTGAJCQTLIRCFL-UHFFFAOYSA-N

Propacetamol is a prodrug form of paracetamol which is formed from esterification of paracetamol, and the carboxylic acid diethylglycine. This has the advantage of making it more water-soluble. It is used in post-operative care and is delivered by I.V. It is given if the patient is unable to take oral or rectally delivered paracetamol and nonsteroidal anti-inflammatory drugs (NSAIDs) are contraindicated. The onset of analgesia from propacetamol is more rapid than paracetamol given orally. 2 grams of propacetamol are equivalent to 1g of paracetamol.

== See also ==
- Phenacetin
