= Imidazole salicylate =

Chemical compound

Imidazole salicylate INN: Imidazole salicylate

Clinical data
- ATC code: N02BA16 (WHO)

Identifiers
- IUPAC name: 2-Hydroxybenzoic acid; 1H-imidazole
- CAS Number: 36364-49-5
- PubChem CID: 37425
- DrugBank: DB13860
- ChemSpider: 34333
- UNII: 4JVD4X01MJ
- KEGG: D07293
- ChEMBL: ChEMBL2104788
- CompTox Dashboard (EPA): DTXSID80189887

Chemical and physical data
- Formula: C_{10}H_{10}N_{2}O_{3}
- Molar mass: 206.201 g·mol^{−1}
- 3D model (JSmol): Interactive image
- SMILES: C1=CC=C(C(=C1)C(=O)O)O.C1=CN=CN1
- InChI: InChI=1S/C7H6O3.C3H4N2/c8-6-4-2-1-3-5(6)7(9)10;1-2-5-3-4-1/h1-4,8H,(H,9,10);1-3H,(H,4,5); Key:XCHHJFVNQPPLJK-UHFFFAOYSA-N

Imidazole salicylate is a nonsteroidal anti-inflammatory drug.
