= Atevirdine =

Reverse-transcriptase inhibitor

Identifiers
- IUPAC name: [4-[3-(ethylamino)pyridin-2-yl]piperazin-1-yl]-(5-methoxy-1H-indol-2-yl)methanone
- CAS Number: 136816-75-6
- PubChem CID: 60848
- DrugBank: DB12264
- ChemSpider: 54835
- UNII: N24015WC6D
- ChEMBL: ChEMBL280527
- CompTox Dashboard (EPA): DTXSID40159940

Chemical and physical data
- Formula: C_{21}H_{25}N_{5}O_{2}
- Molar mass: 379.464 g·mol^{−1}
- 3D model (JSmol): Interactive image
- SMILES: CCNC1=C(N=CC=C1)N2CCN(CC2)C(=O)C3=CC4=C(N3)C=CC(=C4)OC
- InChI: InChI=InChI=1S/C21H25N5O2/c1-3-22-18-5-4-8-23-20(18)25-9-11-26(12-10-25)21(27)19-14-15-13-16(28-2)6-7-17(15)24-19/h4-8,13-14,22,24H,3,9-12H2,1-2H3; Key:UCPOMLWZWRTIAA-UHFFFAOYSA-N

Atevirdine is a non-nucleoside reverse transcriptase inhibitor that has been studied for the treatment of HIV.

== Synthesis ==
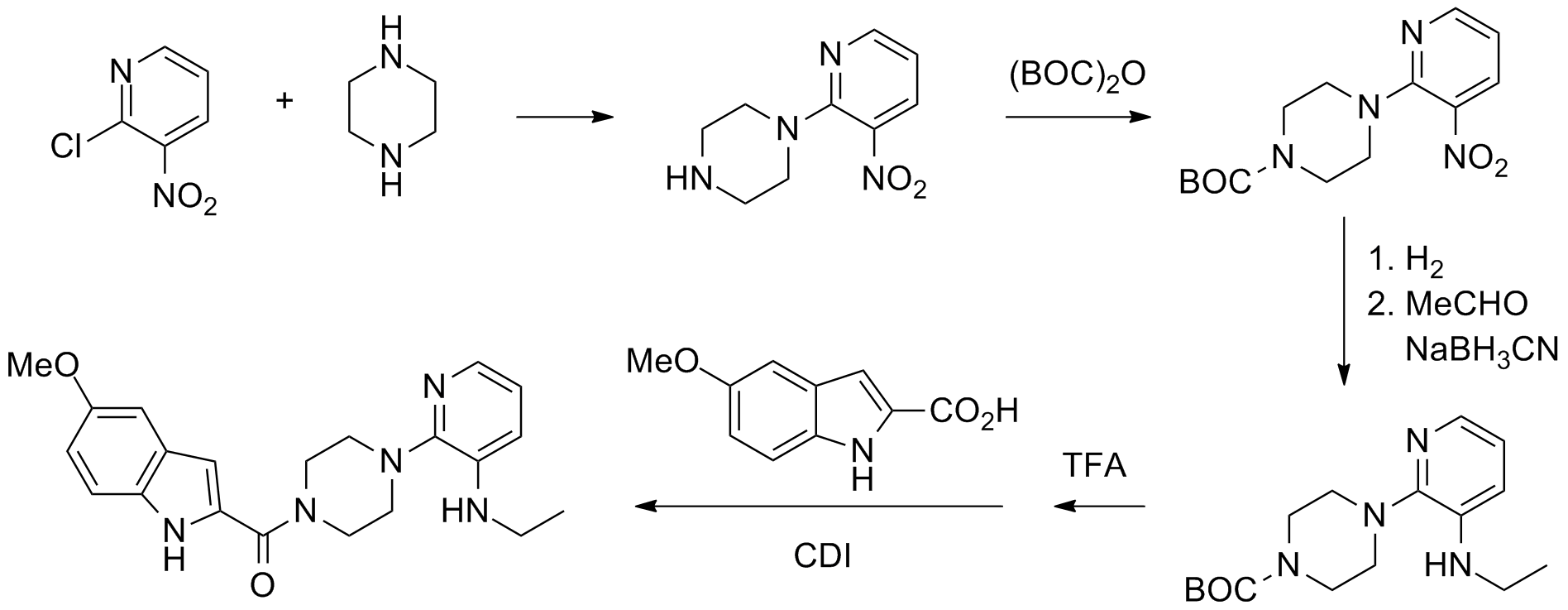
Atevirdine synthesis: SAR:

Preparation of the pyridylpiperazine moiety starts by aromatic displacement of chlorine from 2-chloro-3-nitropyridine by piperazine to give 3. The secondary amine is then protected as its BOC derivative by reaction with di-tert-butyl dicarbonate (Boc anhydride) to give 4. The nitro group is then reduced by catalytic hydrogenation. Reductive alkylation with acetaldehyde in the presence of lithium cyanoborohydride gives the corresponding N-ethyl derivative. The protecting group is then removed by reaction with TFA. Reaction of the resulting amine with the imidazolide derivative of 5-methoxy-3-indoleacetic acid produces the amide reverse transcriptase inhibitor, atevirdine.

== See also ==
- Delavirdine
