= Morpholine salicylate =

Chemical compound

Clinical data
- AHFS/Drugs.com: morpholine-salicylate
- ATC code: N02BA08 (WHO)

Identifiers
- IUPAC name: 2-Hydroxybenzoic acid; morpholine
- CAS Number: 147-90-0
- PubChem CID: 120183
- ChemSpider: 107295
- UNII: G52K1S38LW
- ChEMBL: ChEMBL2104788
- CompTox Dashboard (EPA): DTXSID40933000
- ECHA InfoCard: 100.005.186

Chemical and physical data
- Formula: C_{11}H_{15}NO_{4}
- Molar mass: 225.244 g·mol^{−1}
- 3D model (JSmol): Interactive image
- SMILES: C1COCCN1.C1=CC=C(C(=C1)C(=O)O)O
- InChI: InChI=1S/C7H6O3.C4H9NO/c8-6-4-2-1-3-5(6)7(9)10;1-3-6-4-2-5-1/h1-4,8H,(H,9,10);5H,1-4H2; Key:MECVOSKQBMPUFG-UHFFFAOYSA-N

Morpholine salicylate is a nonsteroidal anti-inflammatory drug.
