= Paraxazone =

Chemical compound

Clinical data
- Pregnancy category: ?
- Routes of administration: Oral
- ATC code: none

Legal status
- Legal status: In general: uncontrolled

Identifiers
- IUPAC name: 2-(3-oxo-2,3-dihydro-4H-1,4-benzoxazin-4-yl)acetamide
- CAS Number: 26513-79-1
- PubChem CID: 3047812
- ChemSpider: 2310126
- UNII: 2H6ON8WA7L
- CompTox Dashboard (EPA): DTXSID10181096

Chemical and physical data
- Formula: C_{10}H_{10}N_{2}O_{3}
- Molar mass: 206.201 g·mol^{−1}
- 3D model (JSmol): Interactive image
- SMILES: O=C(N)CN1c2c(OCC1=O)cccc2

Paraxazone is an antidepressant. It acts as a reversible inhibitor of the enzyme monoamine oxidase (MAO). It was never marketed.

== See also ==
- Caroxazone
