= Trimethoprim/sulfadoxine =

Combination drug

Combination of
- Trimethoprim: Dihydrofolate reductase inhibitor
- Sulfadoxine: Sulfonamide antibiotic

Clinical data
- Trade names: Trimidox

Identifiers
- CAS Number: 95933-74-7

Trimethoprim/sulfadoxine, sold under the brand name Trimidox, is an antibacterial agent that is used in cattle and swine to prevent and treat infections by both gram-negative and gram-positive bacteria.

== Veterinary uses ==
Trimethoprim/sulfadoxine is used in the treatment of swine and cattle, including dairy cattle, beef cattle and veal.

In cattle, it is used to treat:

- Respiratory tract infections such as bovine pneumonia pasteurellosis (shipping fever)
- Alimentary tract infections such as salmonellosis and both enteric and septicaemic colibacillosis
- Other infections such as pododermatitis (foot rot) and septicaemias

In swine, it is used to treat:

- Respiratory tract infections such as bacterial pneumonias
- Alimentary tract infections such as post-weaning scours and colibacillosis
- Other infections such as bacterial arthritis and mastitis-metritis-agalactia syndrome in sows.

=== Contraindications ===
Trimethoprim/sulfadoxine is contraindicated in cattle or swine that show marked liver parenchymal damage or blood dyscrasias, or those with a history of sulfonamide sensitivity.

Milk from an animal treated with trimethoprim/sulfadoxine must not be consumed for at least 96 hours following the most recent treatment; treated animals must not be slaughtered for use in food for at least ten days after the last treatment.
