= Floctafenine =

Chemical compound

Clinical data
- AHFS/Drugs.com: International Drug Names
- ATC code: N02BG04 (WHO)

Legal status
- Legal status: CA: ℞-only

Identifiers
- IUPAC name: 2,3-Dihydroxypropyl 2-{{#parsoidfragment:3}}{[8-(trifluoromethyl)-4-quinolinyl]amino}benzoate
- CAS Number: 23779-99-9
- PubChem CID: 3360
- DrugBank: DB08976
- ChemSpider: 3243
- UNII: O04HVX6A9Q
- CompTox Dashboard (EPA): DTXSID8057695
- ECHA InfoCard: 100.041.696

Chemical and physical data
- Formula: C_{20}H_{17}F_{3}N_{2}O_{4}
- Molar mass: 406.361 g·mol^{−1}
- 3D model (JSmol): Interactive image
- SMILES: FC(F)(F)c1cccc2c(ccnc12)Nc3ccccc3C(=O)OCC(O)CO
- InChI: InChI=1S/C20H17F3N2O4/c21-20(22,23)15-6-3-5-13-17(8-9-24-18(13)15)25-16-7-2-1-4-14(16)19(28)29-11-12(27)10-26/h1-9,12,26-27H,10-11H2,(H,24,25); Key:APQPGQGAWABJLN-UHFFFAOYSA-N

Floctafenine is a nonsteroidal anti-inflammatory drug (NSAID).

== Synthesis ==
Floctafenine can be synthesized beginning with the conversion of ortho-trifluoromethyl aniline (1) to a quinolol. The compound is then condensed with ethoxy methylene malonic diethyl ester (EMME) and cyclized thermally (2). That intermediate is then saponified; the resulting acid is decarboxylated and finally converted to the 4-chloroquinoline (3) by reaction with phosphorus oxychloride. The displacement of chlorine with methyl anthranilate (4) then affords the coupled intermediate (5). An ester interchange of that product with glycerol leads to the glyceryl ester, floctafenine (6).

Flocatfenine synthesis
