= Fluanisone =

Chemical compound

Clinical data
- ATC code: N05AD09 (WHO)

Identifiers
- IUPAC name: 1-(4-Fluorophenyl)-4-[4-(2-methoxyphenyl)piperazin-1-yl]butan-1-one
- CAS Number: 1480-19-9
- PubChem CID: 15139
- DrugBank: DB13665
- ChemSpider: 14410
- UNII: 1D0W98U1I4
- KEGG: D02621
- ChEMBL: ChEMBL58792
- CompTox Dashboard (EPA): DTXSID4045711
- ECHA InfoCard: 100.014.581

Chemical and physical data
- Formula: C_{21}H_{25}FN_{2}O_{2}
- Molar mass: 356.441 g·mol^{−1}
- 3D model (JSmol): Interactive image
- SMILES: Fc1ccc(cc1)C(=O)CCCN3CCN(c2ccccc2OC)CC3
- InChI: InChI=1S/C21H25FN2O2/c1-26-21-7-3-2-5-19(21)24-15-13-23(14-16-24)12-4-6-20(25)17-8-10-18(22)11-9-17/h2-3,5,7-11H,4,6,12-16H2,1H3; Key:IRYFCWPNDIUQOW-UHFFFAOYSA-N

Fluanisone is a typical antipsychotic and sedative of the butyrophenone chemical class. It is used in the treatment of schizophrenia and mania. It is also a component (along with fentanyl) of the injectable veterinary formulation fentanyl/fluanisone (Hypnorm) where it is used for rodent analgesia during short surgical procedures.

== See also ==
- Enciprazine
- BMY-14802
- Azaperone
