= Enpiprazole =

Chemical compound

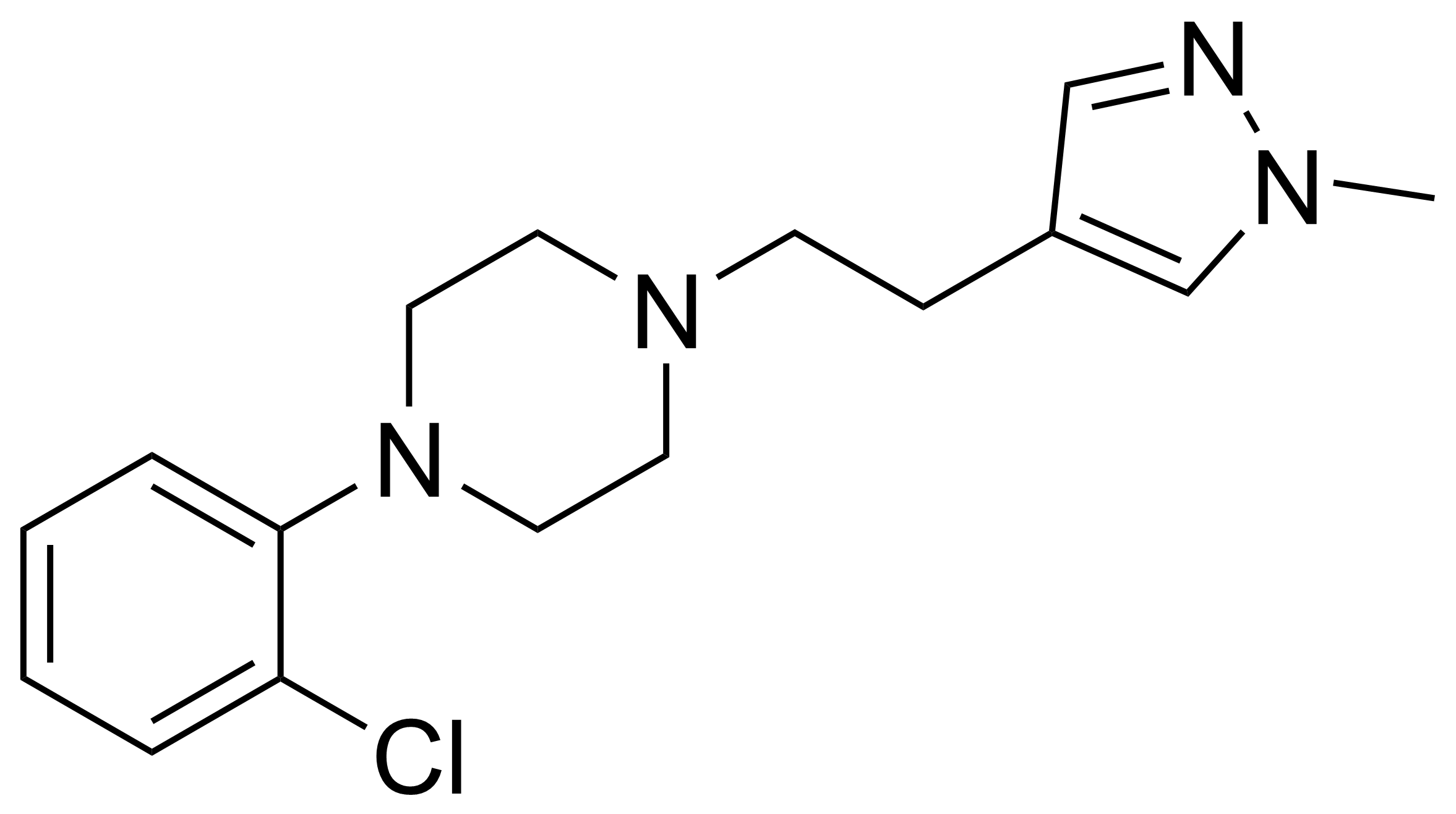

Clinical data
- Routes of administration: Oral
- ATC code: none

Legal status
- Legal status: In general: uncontrolled

Identifiers
- IUPAC name: 1-(2-Chlorophenyl)-4-[2-(1-methyl-1H-pyrazol-4-yl)ethyl]piperazine
- CAS Number: 31729-24-5
- PubChem CID: 208921
- ChemSpider: 181017
- UNII: 78G92X9EH7
- ChEMBL: ChEMBL2104269
- CompTox Dashboard (EPA): DTXSID30865609

Chemical and physical data
- Formula: C_{16}H_{21}ClN_{4}
- Molar mass: 304.82 g·mol^{−1}
- 3D model (JSmol): Interactive image
- SMILES: Clc3ccccc3N2CCN(CCc1cn(nc1)C)CC2

Enpiprazole (INN, BAN) is an anxiolytic drug of the phenylpiperazine group that was never marketed. It produces anxiolytic-like effects in animals, though these effects appear to be biphasic and may reverse at high doses. It is known to produce ortho-chlorophenylpiperazine (oCPP) as a metabolite.

== See also ==
- Acaprazine
- Enciprazine
- Lorpiprazole
- Mepiprazole
- Tolpiprazole
