= Delavirdine =

Chemical compound

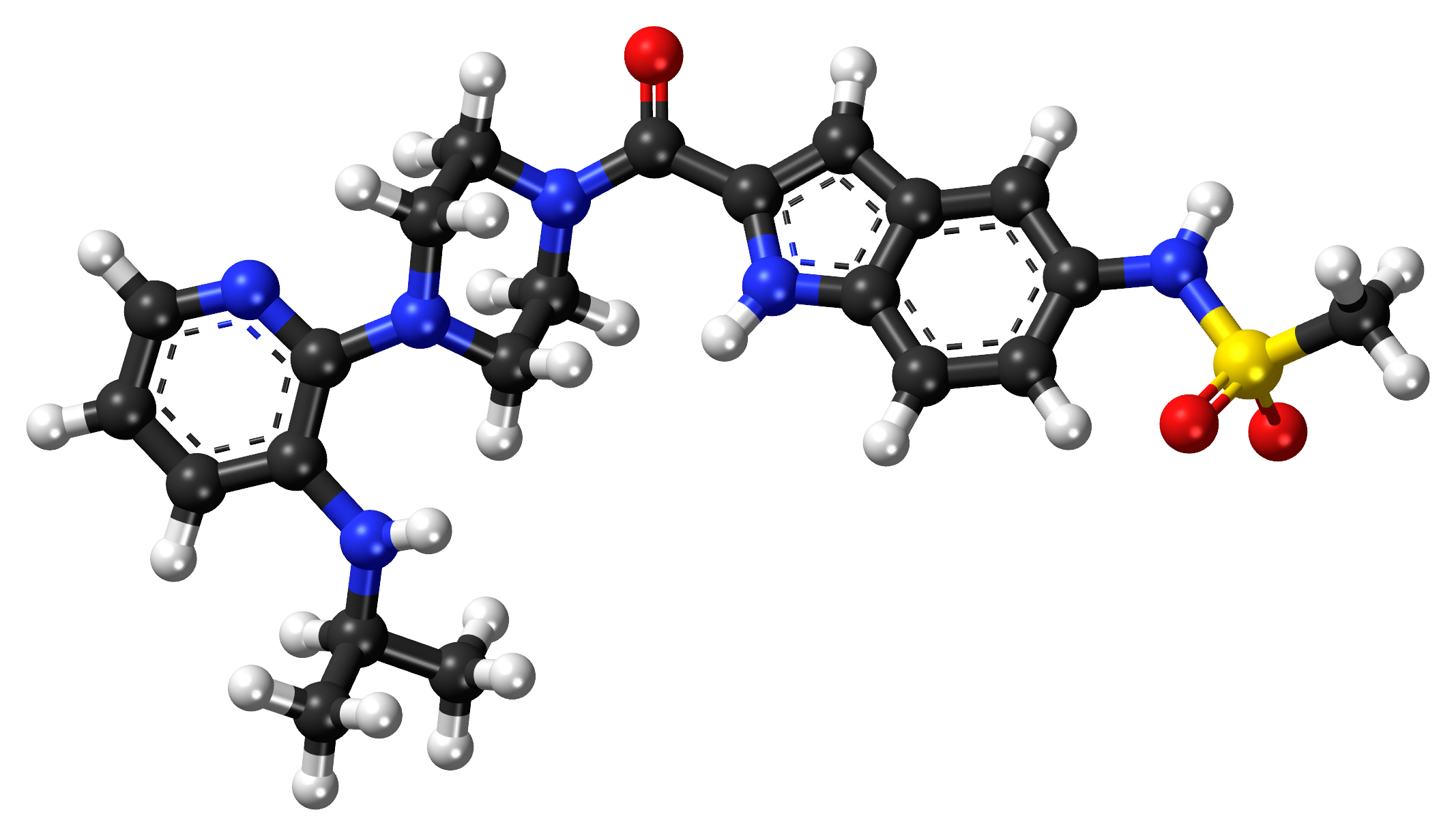

Clinical data
- Trade names: Rescriptor
- AHFS/Drugs.com: Monograph
- MedlinePlus: a600034
- Pregnancy category: AU: B3
- Routes of administration: By mouth
- ATC code: J05AG02 (WHO)

Legal status
- Legal status: US: ℞-only

Pharmacokinetic data
- Bioavailability: 85%
- Protein binding: 98%
- Metabolism: Liver (CYP3A4- and CYP2D6-mediated)
- Elimination half-life: 5.8 hours
- Excretion: Kidney (51%) and feces (44%)

Identifiers
- IUPAC name: N-[2-({4-[3-(propan-2-ylamino)pyridin-2-yl]piperazin-1-yl}carbonyl)-1H-indol-5-yl]methanesulfonamide
- CAS Number: 136817-59-9
- PubChem CID: 5625
- DrugBank: DB00705
- ChemSpider: 5423
- UNII: DOL5F9JD3E
- KEGG: D07782
- ChEBI: CHEBI:119573
- ChEMBL: ChEMBL593
- NIAID ChemDB: 005059
- PDB ligand: SPP (PDBe, RCSB PDB)
- CompTox Dashboard (EPA): DTXSID6022892

Chemical and physical data
- Formula: C_{22}H_{28}N_{6}O_{3}S
- Molar mass: 456.57 g·mol^{−1}
- 3D model (JSmol): Interactive image
- SMILES: CC(C)Nc1cccnc1N4CCN(C(=O)c3cc2cc(NS(C)(=O)=O)ccc2[nH]3)CC4
- InChI: InChI=1S/C22H28N6O3S/c1-15(2)24-19-5-4-8-23-21(19)27-9-11-28(12-10-27)22(29)20-14-16-13-17(26-32(3,30)31)6-7-18(16)25-20/h4-8,13-15,24-26H,9-12H2,1-3H3; Key:WHBIGIKBNXZKFE-UHFFFAOYSA-N

Delavirdine (DLV) (brand name Rescriptor) is a non-nucleoside reverse transcriptase inhibitor (NNRTI) that was marketed by ViiV Healthcare. It was used as part of highly active antiretroviral therapy (HAART) for the treatment of HIV-1 in the late 1990s and early 2000s. It is presented as the mesylate. The recommended dosage is 400 mg (as four 100-mg tablets or two 200-mg tablets) three times a day.

Although delavirdine was approved by the U.S. Food and Drug Administration in 1997, its efficacy was found to be lower than other NNRTIs, especially efavirenz, and it also had an inconvenient dosing schedule. These factors have led the U.S. DHHS not to recommend its use as part of initial therapy. The risk of cross-resistance across the NNRTI class, as well as its complex set of drug interactions, made the place of delavirdine in second-line and salvage therapy unclear, and it was very rarely used.

As of 2018, its manufacturing and distribution was discontinued in the United States and Canada. It has not been used in other countries.

== Interactions ==
Like ritonavir, delavirdine is an inhibitor of cytochrome P450 isozyme CYP3A4, and interacts with many medications. It should not be administered with a wide range of drugs, including amprenavir, fosamprenavir, simvastatin, lovastatin, rifampin, rifabutin, rifapentine, St John's wort, midazolam, triazolam, ergot medications, and several medications for acid reflux.

== Adverse effects ==
The most common adverse event is moderate to severe rash, which occurs in up to 20% of patients. Other common adverse events include fatigue, headache and nausea. Liver toxicity has also been reported.

== Synthesis ==
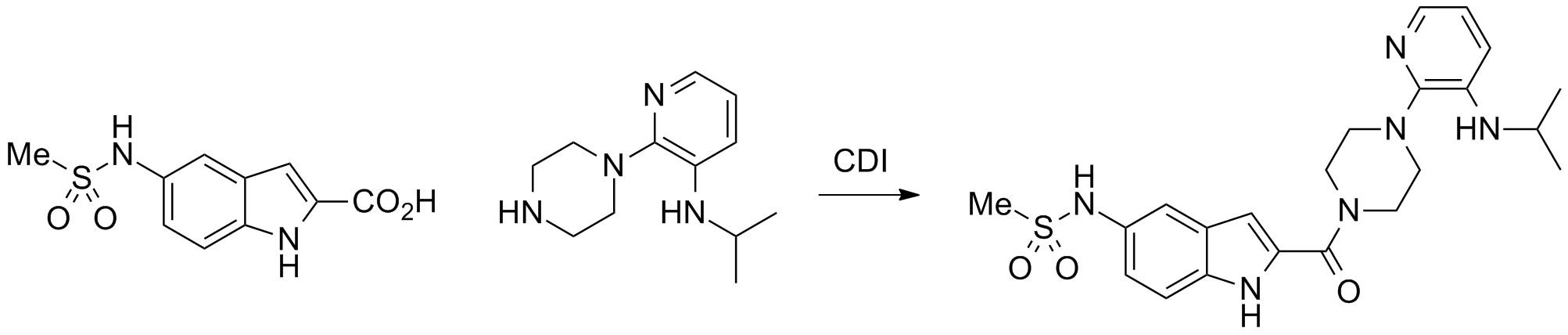
Delavirdine synthesis:

Modification of the scheme that was done for ateviridine q.v. by performing the reductive alkylation with acetone gives 2 after removal of the protecting group. Acylation of this amine with the imidazolide from 5-Methylsulfonaminoindole-2-carboxylic acid (1) affords the amide, reverse transcriptase inhibitor, atevirdine.
