= Psycholeptic =

Calming medication

Barbiturate

In pharmacology, a psycholeptic is a medication which produces a calming effect upon a person. Such medications include barbiturates, benzodiazepines, nonbenzodiazepines, phenothiazines, opiates/opioids, carbamates, ethanol, 2-methyl-2-butanol, GHB, cannabinoids (in some classifications), some antidepressants, neuroleptics, and some anticonvulsants. Many herbal medicines may also be classified as psycholeptics (e.g. kava).

The psycholeptics are classified under N05 in the Anatomical Therapeutic Chemical Classification System.

== See also ==
- Analeptic
- Anxiolytics
