= Azaperone =

Chemical compound

Clinical data
- AHFS/Drugs.com: International Drug Names
- Routes of administration: IM
- ATCvet code: QN01AX91 (WHO) QN05AD90 (WHO)

Pharmacokinetic data
- Metabolism: Hepatic
- Elimination half-life: 4 hours

Identifiers
- IUPAC name: 1-(4-fluorophenyl)-4-[4-(pyridin-2-yl)piperazin-1-yl]butan-1-one
- CAS Number: 1649-18-9
- PubChem CID: 15443
- DrugBank: DB11376
- ChemSpider: 14695
- UNII: 19BV78AK7W
- KEGG: D02620
- ChEBI: CHEBI:88301
- ChEMBL: ChEMBL340211
- CompTox Dashboard (EPA): DTXSID2045361
- ECHA InfoCard: 100.015.197

Chemical and physical data
- Formula: C_{19}H_{22}FN_{3}O
- Molar mass: 327.403 g·mol^{−1}
- 3D model (JSmol): Interactive image
- Melting point: 90 to 95 °C (194 to 203 °F)
- SMILES: Fc1ccc(cc1)C(=O)CCCN3CCN(c2ncccc2)CC3
- InChI: InChI=1S/C19H22FN3O/c20-17-8-6-16(7-9-17)18(24)4-3-11-22-12-14-23(15-13-22)19-5-1-2-10-21-19/h1-2,5-10H,3-4,11-15H2; Key:XTKDAFGWCDAMPY-UHFFFAOYSA-N

Azaperone is a pyridinylpiperazine and butyrophenone neuroleptic drug with sedative and antiemetic effects, which is used mainly as a tranquilizer in veterinary medicine. It is uncommonly used in humans as an antipsychotic drug.

Azaperone acts primarily as a dopamine antagonist but also has some antihistaminic and anticholinergic properties as seen with similar drugs such as haloperidol. Azaperone may cause hypotension and while it has minimal effects on respiration in pigs, high doses in humans can cause respiratory depression.

== Veterinary use ==
The most common use for azaperone is in relatively small doses as a "serenic" (to reduce aggression) in farmed pigs, either to stop them fighting or to encourage sows to accept piglets. Higher doses are used for anesthesia in combination with other drugs such as xylazine, tiletamine and zolazepam. Azaperone is also used in combination with strong narcotics such as etorphine or carfentanil for tranquilizing large animals such as elephants. Use in horses is avoided as adverse reactions may occur.

The European Medicines Agency has established a maximum residue limit for azaperone when administered to pigs.

Azaperone (under the brand name Stresnil) was approved for use in pigs in the USA in 1983, under NADA 115-732.

== Synthesis ==
52%: Patent: Improved method: Radiolabelled:

The alkylation of 2-chloropyridine (1) with piperazine gives 1-(pyridin-2-yl)piperazine [67980-77-2] (2). The attachment of the sidechain by reaction with 4-chloro-4'-fluorobutyrophenone [3874-54-2] (3) completed the synthesis of azaperone (4).

== See also ==
- Enciprazine
- BMY-14802
- Fluanisone
