= Esteve =

Spanish pharmaceutical company

- Type: Private
- Industry: Pharmaceuticals
- Founded: 1929
- Headquarters: Barcelona, Spain
- Key people: Staffan Schüberg (CEO), Albert Esteve (Chairman)
- Number of employees: 2,000 (average, 2023)
- Website: esteve.com

Esteve is a Spanish international pharmaceutical company headquartered in Barcelona with more than 90 years of experience. Since its founding in 1929, Esteve has extended its pharmaceutical operations to Spain, Portugal, Germany, France, and the United Kingdom, Esteve supplies medicines to more than 7 million patients worldwide.

With industrial sites in Spain, Mexico, and China, Esteve covers the contract manufacturing (CMO) business. The company's product portfolio includes drugs for the treatment of serious diseases in therapeutic areas such as oncology and pain, the central nervous system, ophthalmology, neurology, and dermatology.

== History ==
The company's origins date back to 1929, when Dr. Antoni Esteve i Subirana, researcher and entrepreneur, founded the firm. Now the family-owned company has around 2,000 employees and operates in different countries and continents, through subsidiary companies in Europe and the US and through production centers in Mexico and China, with products directly present in 40 countries and indirectly present, through licensing and distribution agreements, in over 60 countries around the world. In 2006, Esteve, together with four Catalan companies in the sector, including the pharmaceutical laboratories Almirall, Ferrer and Grupo Uriach, created the Genius Pharma consortium to develop technological platforms and best practices in the discovery of innovative medicines. 2007 Esteve opens its representative office in New Jersey, Esteve USA. Esteve Veterinary Medicine begins commercial operations in Germany through its subsidiary Euracon Pharma GmbH. It also enters Italy with human pharmaceuticals through its generic drug subsidiary (EFG), Pensa Pharma.

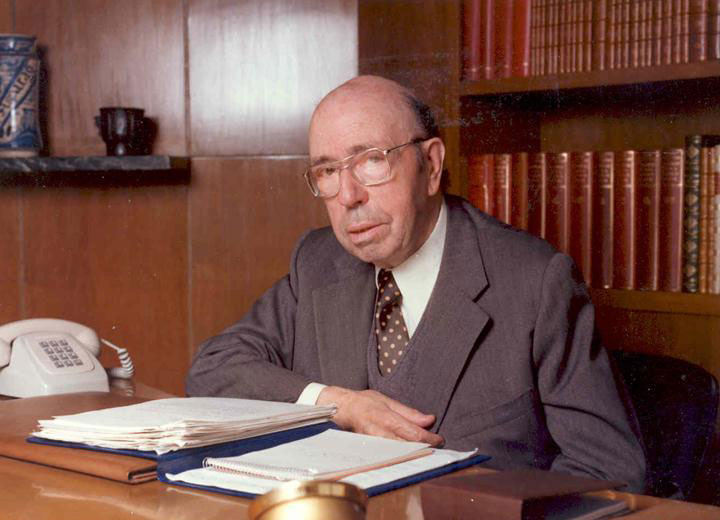
Antoni Esteve i Subirana, company founder

Leadership Transition (2018): In 2018, Esteve Pharmaceuticals marked a significant shift in its leadership by appointing its first external CEO, signaling a new phase of professional management. This was a major change as the Esteve family had historically retained control of the company since its founding.

Divestment and Acquisition (2020): In 2020, Esteve divested its entire generics business, Pensa, to Japanese pharmaceutical company Towa for an upfront payment of €320 million (approximately $357 million). This divestiture allowed Esteve to focus on more specialised medicines. Additionally, Esteve acquired Riemser, a specialty pharmaceuticals company, from Ardian, expanding its portfolio in specialty medicine.

Stake Sale to Lubea (2023): In 2023, Esteve sold a 26% stake of the company to Germany’s Lubea, valuing the entire firm at approximately €1.8 billion (around $1.98 billion). This sale highlighted the growing strategic partnerships Esteve was forming to further internationalize its operations.

Acquisition of HRA Pharma Rare Diseases (2024): Esteve continued its expansion in the specialty and rare diseases sector by acquiring HRA Pharma Rare Diseases from Perrigo in 2024. The transaction, valued at up to €275 million ($296 million), included an upfront cash payment of €190 million ($205 million) and potential earnouts tied to future performance. The acquisition strengthens Esteve's portfolio with key drugs targeting conditions such as Cushing's syndrome and adrenocortical carcinoma, boosting their presence in Europe and the U.S.

Expansion in Girona (2024): In 2024, Esteve Pharmaceuticals began the construction of a new manufacturing unit at its Girona plant to enhance its production of active pharmaceutical ingredients (APIs). This project, which is expected to be completed by 2026, involves a €100 million ($108 million) investment. The new facility will house both production and service buildings, allowing up to 150 cubic meters of reaction volume. Esteve anticipates a 45% increase in production capacity at this plant, with a further 15% growth in its overall global production capacity.

== Company focus ==
Esteve focuses mainly on two health-related fields: the pharmaceutical field and the active pharmaceutical ingredient field, or fine chemistry. In the pharmaceutical field, Esteve has activities in research and development (R&D) of innovative medicines, particularly in pain and other areas with unmet therapeutic needs, based on both in-house and collaborative R&D programs as well as on innovative formulations. In 2017 for example, Esteve invested in the development of alternative treatments to strong opioids. In the chemical field, the company focuses on the development of new processes, production and commercialization of active pharmaceutical ingredients.
