= Bedinvetmab =

Monoclonal antibody

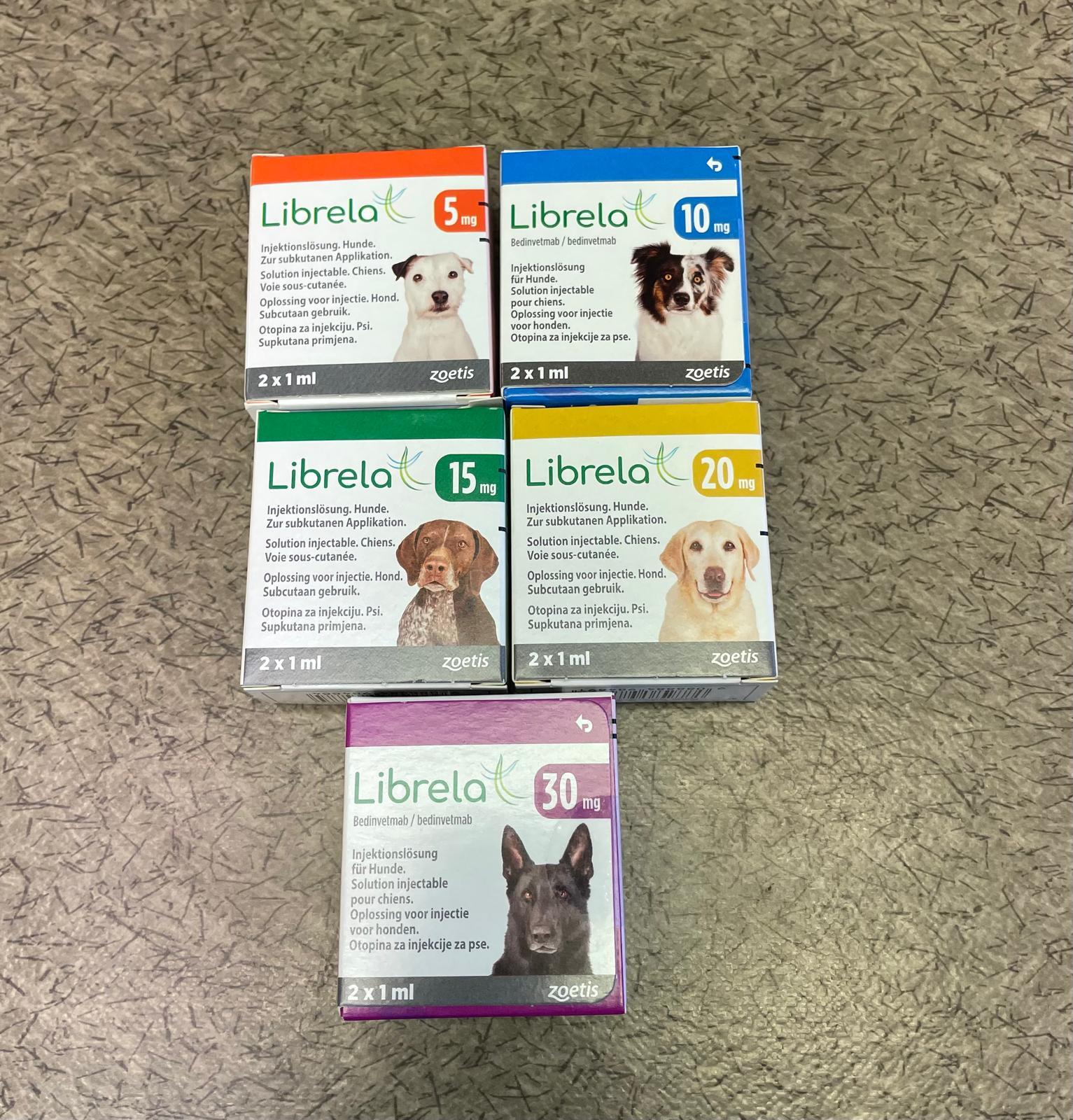

Monoclonal antibody
- Type: Whole antibody
- Target: Nerve growth factor (NGF)

Clinical data
- Trade names: Librela
- AHFS/Drugs.com: Veterinary Use
- License data: US DailyMed: Bedinvetmab
- Routes of administration: Subcutaneous
- ATCvet code: QN02BG91 (WHO)

Legal status
- Legal status: CA: ℞-only; US: ℞-only; EU: Rx-only

Identifiers
- CAS Number: 2171034-69-6
- UNII: 1AY63T2BE2

Chemical and physical data
- Formula: C_{6458}H_{9972}N_{1740}O_{2014}S_{44}
- Molar mass: 145623.62 g·mol^{−1}

Bedinvetmab, sold under the brand name Librela, is a fully canine monoclonal antibody used for the control of pain associated with osteoarthritis in dogs. Librela is sponsored by Zoetis.

Bedinvetmab was approved for medical use in the European Union in November 2020, and in the United States in May 2023. Bedinvetmab is the first monoclonal antibody approved in the United States for controlling osteoarthritis pain in dogs.

== Medical uses ==
Bedinvetmab is indicated for the alleviation of pain associated with osteoarthritis in dogs.

== Adverse effects ==
The most common side effects include elevated blood urea nitrogen (an indicator of kidney function), urinary tract infection, bacterial skin infection, skin irritation, rash or pain at injection site, vomiting, and weight loss. The FDA issued a "Dear Veterinarian Letter" in December 2024 notifying veterinarians about adverse events reported in dogs treated with Librela (bedinvetmab injection) primarily neurological in nature, such as: ataxia, seizures, paresis, recumbency, urinary incontinence, polyuria, and polydipsia.

A global pharmacovigilance reporting of the first monoclonal antibody for canine osteoarthritis in April 2025 found that the most common reported adverse events following the distribution of over 18 million doses of bedinvetmab are considered rare or very rare according to the definition by the CIOM.

== Pharmacology ==
Bedinvetmab targets nerve growth factor (NGF) which plays an important role in pain signalling in mammals and is elevated in osteroarthritic joints of dogs. The elevated NGF levels in joints lead to hyperalgesia (higher sensitivity to pain). The drug targets NGF and prevents its interaction with tropomyosin receptor kinase A (TrkA) leading to a decreased hyperalgesic response associated with osteoarthritis and has been shown effective on all three components of CBPI - pain interference, pain severity and quality of life.

== History ==
Two field studies were conducted to evaluate the effectiveness of bedinvetmab – one in the United States and one in the European Union. Both studies enrolled client-owned dogs diagnosed with osteoarthritis. Half the dogs received bedinvetmab and half the dogs received a sterile saline injection every 28 days for a total of three doses. Before treatment and on various days throughout the study, owners used the Canine Brief Pain Inventory (CBPI) assessment tool to measure the severity of the dog's pain and the degree to which the pain interfered with the dog's daily activities. The weight of evidence from the two field studies demonstrated that bedinvetmab is effective at controlling pain associated with osteoarthritis in dogs when at least two doses are given 28 days apart.

== Society and culture ==
=== Names ===
Bedinvetmab is the international nonproprietary name.
