= Caroxazone =

Chemical compound

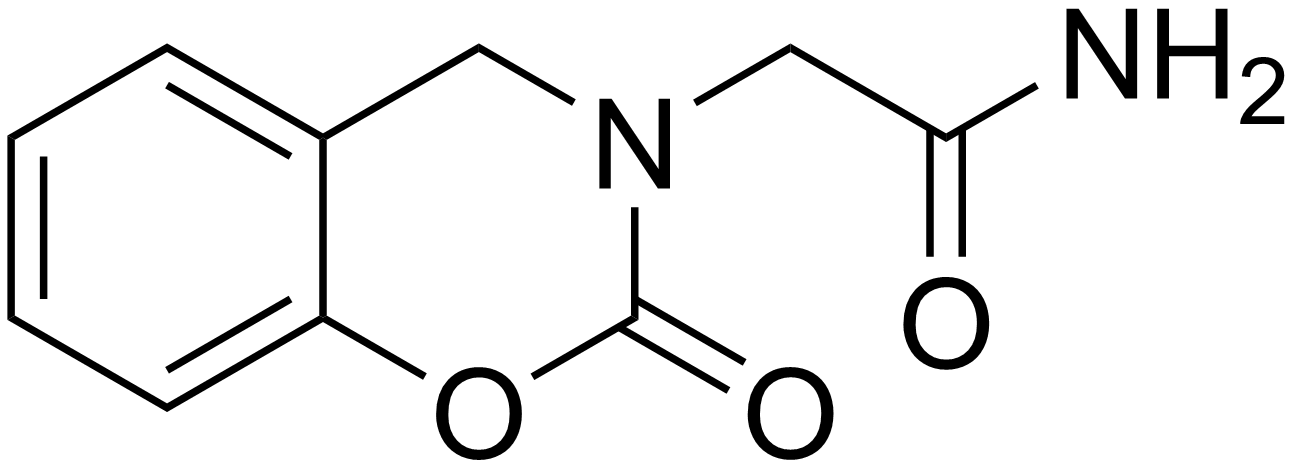

Clinical data
- Pregnancy category: ?
- Routes of administration: Oral
- ATC code: none

Legal status
- Legal status: BR: Class C1 (Other controlled substances); In general: ℞ (Prescription only)

Identifiers
- IUPAC name: 2-(2-oxo-4H-1,3-benzoxazin-3-yl)acetamide
- CAS Number: 18464-39-6
- PubChem CID: 29083
- ChemSpider: 27057
- UNII: 807N226MNL
- ChEMBL: ChEMBL2104164
- CompTox Dashboard (EPA): DTXSID10171598
- ECHA InfoCard: 100.038.481

Chemical and physical data
- Formula: C_{10}H_{10}N_{2}O_{3}
- Molar mass: 206.201 g·mol^{−1}
- 3D model (JSmol): Interactive image
- SMILES: O=C(N)CN2C(=O)Oc1ccccc1C2

Caroxazone (Surodil, Timostenil) is an antidepressant which was formerly used for the treatment of depression but is now no longer marketed. It acts as a reversible monoamine oxidase inhibitor (RIMA) of both MAO-A and MAO-B subtypes, with five-fold preference for the latter.

== Synthesis ==
Caroxazone synthesis:

Synthesis starts by reductive amination of salicylaldehyde and glycinamide to give 3. The synthesis is completed by reaction with phosgene and NaHCO_{3}.

== See also ==
- Paraxazone, an isomer of Caroxazone
