= Morphine/naltrexone =

Combination medication

Combination of
- Morphine sulfate: Opioid
- Naltrexone: Opioid antagonist

Clinical data
- Trade names: Embeda
- AHFS/Drugs.com: Micromedex Detailed Consumer Information
- Routes of administration: By mouth

Legal status
- Legal status: US: Schedule II

Identifiers
- CAS Number: 1131418-84-2

Morphine/naltrexone, sold under the brand name Embeda, is an opioid combination pain medication developed by King Pharmaceuticals for use in moderate to severe pain. The active ingredients are morphine sulfate and naltrexone hydrochloride; morphine being an opioid receptor agonist and naltrexone an opioid receptor antagonist. It is a Schedule II controlled substance in the United States and is intended for long-term pain caused by malignancy or where lower tiers of the pain management ladder have already been exhausted, and where medications such as oxycodone would otherwise have been indicated.

King Pharmaceuticals temporarily recalled Embeda in 2011 after complaints from the US Food and Drug Asministration (FDA) in regard to King Pharmaceuticals omitting information regarding the potentially fatal reaction if crushed and swallowed and also for making unsubstantiated claims regarding Embeda's reduced abuse potential.
