= Salsalate =

Chemical compound

Clinical data
- Trade names: Disalcid, Salflex
- AHFS/Drugs.com: Monograph
- MedlinePlus: a682880
- ATC code: N02BA06 (WHO)

Legal status
- Legal status: US: ℞-only

Identifiers
- IUPAC name: 2-(2-Hydroxybenzoyl)oxybenzoic acid
- CAS Number: 552-94-3
- PubChem CID: 5161
- DrugBank: DB01399
- ChemSpider: 4977
- UNII: V9MO595C9I
- KEGG: D00428
- ChEBI: CHEBI:9014
- CompTox Dashboard (EPA): DTXSID1023572
- ECHA InfoCard: 100.008.208

Chemical and physical data
- Formula: C_{14}H_{10}O_{5}
- Molar mass: 258.229 g·mol^{−1}

Salsalate is a medication that belongs to the salicylate and nonsteroidal anti-inflammatory drug (NSAID) classes.

Salsalate is the generic name of a prescription drug marketed under the brandnames Mono-Gesic, Salflex, Disalcid, and Salsitab. Other generic and brand name formulations may be available.

== Mechanism of action ==
Relative to other NSAIDs, salsalate has a weak inhibitory effect on the cyclooxygenase enzyme and decreases the production of several proinflammatory chemical signals such as interleukin-6, TNF-alpha, and C-reactive protein.

The mechanism through which salsalate is thought to reduce the production of these inflammatory chemical signals is through the inhibition of IκB kinase resulting in decreased action of NF-κB genes. This mechanism is thought to be responsible for salsalate's insulin-sensitizing and blood sugar lowering properties.

== Medical uses ==
Salsalate may be used for inflammatory disorders such as rheumatoid arthritis or noninflammatory disorders such as osteoarthritis.

== Safety ==
The risk of bleeding is a common concern with use of the NSAID class of medications. However, the bleeding risk associated with salsalate is lower than that associated with aspirin use.

== Research ==
Salsalate has been proposed for the prevention and treatment of type 2 diabetes mellitus due to its ability to lower insulin resistance associated with inflammation and may be useful in prediabetes. However, the use of salsalate to prevent the progression from prediabetes to type 2 diabetes mellitus has received limited study.

== History ==
Salsalate had been suggested as possible treatment for diabetes as early as 1876.

== Synthesis ==
Salsalate synthesis:
