= Oxycodone/paracetamol =

Pain medication

Combination of
- Oxycodone: Opioid analgesic
- Acetaminophen: Anilide analgesic

Clinical data
- Trade names: Percocet, others
- AHFS/Drugs.com: acetaminophen-and-oxycodone; Professional Drug Facts
- License data: US DailyMed: Oxycodone hydrochloride and acetaminophen
- Routes of administration: By mouth
- ATC code: N02AJ17 (WHO)

Legal status
- Legal status: US: Schedule II

Identifiers
- CAS Number: 330988-72-2
- ChemSpider: 4881971
- KEGG: D02153
- CompTox Dashboard (EPA): DTXSID10186763

Oxycodone/paracetamol, sold under the brand name Percocet among others, is a fixed-dose combination of the opioid oxycodone with paracetamol (acetaminophen), used to treat moderate to severe pain.

In 2023, it was the 93rd most commonly prescribed medication in the United States, with more than seven million prescriptions.

== History ==
The United States Food and Drug Administration (FDA) first approved oxycodone/paracetamol in 1976, under application ANDA 085106.

== Society and culture ==
Percocet is often called perc for short. Since the early 2010s, the medication has commonly been name-dropped in songs from multiple genres, such as Future's 2017 song "Mask Off".

=== Implicated in deaths ===
In June 2009, an FDA advisory panel recommended that Percocet, Vicodin, and every other combination of acetaminophen with narcotic analgesics be limited in their sales because of their contributions to an alleged 400 acetaminophen-related deaths in the U.S. each year, that were attributed to acetaminophen overdose and associated liver damage.

In December 2009, a study found a fivefold increase in oxycodone-related deaths in Ontario, Canada (mostly accidental) between 1991 and 2007; this led to a doubling of all opioid-related deaths in Ontario over the same period.
