= Hydrocodone/ibuprofen =

Combination drug

Combination of
- Hydrocodone: Opioid analgesic
- Ibuprofen: Non-steroidal anti-inflammatory drug

Clinical data
- Trade names: Vicoprofen, others
- AHFS/Drugs.com: Professional Drug Facts
- MedlinePlus: a601006
- License data: US DailyMed: Hydrocodone and ibuprofen
- Dependence liability: Moderate
- Routes of administration: By mouth
- ATC code: N02AJ23 (WHO)

Legal status
- Legal status: US: Schedule II; In general: ℞ (Prescription only)

Pharmacokinetic data
- Bioavailability: >80%
- Metabolism: for hydrocodone: liver, CYP3A4; for ibuprofen: liver, CYP2C9
- Elimination half-life: for hydrocodone: 228-294 mins (3.8-4.9 hrs); for ibuprofen: 108-120 mins (1.8-2 hrs)
- Excretion: for hydrocodone: urinary; for ibuprofen: urine primarily (<1% unchanged)

Identifiers
- KEGG: D02152
- CompTox Dashboard (EPA): DTXSID80210564

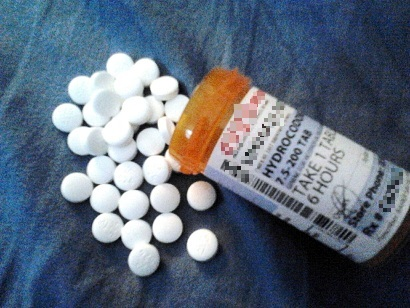
Generic hydrocodone/ibuprofen 7.5/200 mg

Hydrocodone/ibuprofen, sold under the brand name Vicoprofen among others, is a fixed-dose combination analgesic medication used in short-term therapy to relieve severe pain. Hydrocodone/ibuprofen contains hydrocodone bitartrate, an opioid analgesic agent; and ibuprofen, a nonsteroidal anti-inflammatory agent.

== Medical uses ==
Hydrocodone/ibuprofen is indicated for the short-term (generally less than 10 days) management of acute pain.

=== Pregnancy ===
Opioids such as hydrocodone cross the placenta, and can therefore affect the fetus. Studies have shown a possible association between opioids and adverse outcomes such as birth defects, poor fetal growth, stillbirth, and preterm delivery. Prolonged use of opioids by a pregnant mother can also lead to neonatal withdrawal syndrome. NSAIDs such as ibuprofen should generally be avoided in pregnancy, as there are conflicting reports of birth defects after in utero exposure. However, it is accepted that NSAIDs prevent closure of the fetal ductus arteriosus, which happens during the later stages of pregnancy. Because of this, ibuprofen should be avoided after 30 weeks gestation.

=== Breastfeeding ===
Hydrocodone and ibuprofen are excreted in breast milk, so appropriate caution should be taken when prescribing to breastfeeding mothers.

=== Special populations ===
There is no evidence to support altered pharmacokinetic properties due to differences in gender or age. However, this drug combination has not been tested in children.

== Adverse effects ==
The side effects for hydrocodone/ibuprofen are a combination of the side effects of the component drugs. Side effects experienced in more than 10% of the population taking the combination include: headache, dizziness, constipation, nausea, and dyspepsia.

In the US, the prescription label for hydrocodone/ibuprofen contains a boxed warning about addiction, abuse, and misuse.

== Pharmacology ==
=== Pharmacokinetics ===
The two active components of the medication, ibuprofen and hydrocodone, do not affect each other's absorption characteristics or other pharmacokinetic parameters. After an oral dose, the peak level of hydrocodone in the blood is reached 1.7 hours after administration. The blood levels of ibuprofen peak 1.8 hours after oral administration.

== History ==
The new drug application for Vicoprofen was approved based on data from both single and multiple dose analgesia trials.

The single dose analgesia studies occurred in multiple surgical settings, including dental, back, and abdominal/gynecologic surgery in the US and Puerto Rico. There were 1,537 patients enrolled over all trials, with 79% of the participants being female. There were 10 single dose analgesia trials included in the new drug application. All studies were similarly designed: after completion of a procedure in which pain was rated as moderate or severe, patients would be randomized into various treatment groups. The treatment groups included: ibuprofen only, hydrocodone only, Vicoprofen (hydrocodone/ibuprofen), and placebo. The participant's pain would then be tracked over the next several hours by the self reporting of pain scores.

There were four multiple dose trials included in the new drug application. These studies were all completed in the US, in settings including burn unit, post-operatively, and chronic pain settings. A total of 683 patients were enrolled in all of the multiple dose trials, with 57% of the participants being women. These studies also looked at self reported pain intensities over a 5-day period of multiple dosing. In these studies, patients were either given the trial drug Vicoprofen or one of two an active controls: codeine with acetaminophen (Tylenol #3) or oxycodone with acetaminophen (Percocet), depending on the trial. Patients were allowed to take a dose as needed but no more than every 4 to 6 hours for up to 5 days. These trials measured efficacy based on parameters including self reported pain scores, number of doses used, and duration of treatment.

=== Discovery and development ===
The patent for Vicoprofen was filed in December 1984, and US patent number 4,587,252 was granted in May 1986. Although ibuprofen and hydrocodone were already available on the market at this time, the fact that they had never been supplied together in a single formulation required approval from the FDA as if it were a new drug. Knoll filed an investigational new drug application on 30 December 1986. A new drug application was later filed by Knoll on 25 April 1996, and received final approval from the FDA on 23 September 1997. Vicoprofen tablets were initially formulated and packaged by Knoll, with ibuprofen supplied by Albemarle Corporation and hydrocodone supplied by Mallinckrodt Pharmaceuticals.

The validity of Knoll's patent on Vicoprofen has been challenged in federal court. In September 2002, the US District Court for the Northern District of Illinois granted a motion of invalidity filed by Teva Pharmaceuticals against Knoll's patent on Vicoprofen, ruling the patent was invalid as obvious. This ruling paved the way for Teva's abbreviated new drug application to be approved by the FDA which would allow them to manufacture and market their own generic. Knoll appealed the decision. In April 2003, Teva announced that its abbreviated new drug application had been approved by the FDA, and its generic would begin shipping immediately. In May 2004, the United States Court of Appeals for the Federal Circuit vacated the previous judgment by the US District Court for the Northern District of Illinois, and the case was remanded back for further court proceedings. Teva continued to sell its generic during this time. The patent for Vicoprofen expired on 18 December 2004, officially opening the drug to generic manufacture. In July 2016, the FDA approved another generic equivalent, manufactured by Aurobindo Pharma Limited.

=== Ownership and promotion ===
Knoll pharmaceuticals, originally founded in Germany in 1886, became a subsidiary of BASF (a German chemical company) in 1975. It was under their control when Vicoprofen was originally developed and approved. In March 2000, Knoll Pharmaceuticals and Abbott Laboratories, an American health care company, announced a co-promotion agreement for Vicoprofen, in which Abbott would promote Vicoprofen to its network of buyers, including physicians, hospitals, and surgical centers. In June 2002, Abbott Laboratories, paid $6.9 billion to acquire the entire Knoll pharmaceutical unit from BASF, including Vicoprofen.

=== DEA classification ===
Vicoprofen was initially scheduled as a schedule III drug, but was later reclassified to a schedule II drug based on the DEA reclassification of products containing hydrocodone, effective October 2014.
