= Mafoprazine =

Veterinary antipsychotic

Clinical data
- Trade names: Mafropan
- AHFS/Drugs.com: Monograph

Identifiers
- IUPAC name: N-[4-[3-[4-(2-fluorophenyl)piperazin-1-yl]propoxy]-3-methoxyphenyl]acetamide
- CAS Number: 80428-29-1
- PubChem CID: 71241
- ChemSpider: 64374
- UNII: D7UUO54C6N
- KEGG: C18361
- ChEMBL: ChEMBL2105101
- CompTox Dashboard (EPA): DTXSID50230310

Chemical and physical data
- Formula: C_{22}H_{28}FN_{3}O_{3}
- Molar mass: 401.482 g·mol^{−1}
- 3D model (JSmol): Interactive image
- SMILES: COC1=C(OCCCN2CCN(CC2)C3=C(F)C=CC=C3)C=CC(NC(C)=O)=C1
- InChI: InChI=1S/C22H28FN3O3/c1-17(27)24-18-8-9-21(22(16-18)28-2)29-15-5-10-25-11-13-26(14-12-25)20-7-4-3-6-19(20)23/h3-4,6-9,16H,5,10-15H2,1-2H3,(H,24,27); Key:PHOCQBYGUQPMIB-UHFFFAOYSA-N

Mafoprazine is an antipsychotic of the phenylpiperazine class which is used in veterinary medicine. Intramuscular injections of mafoprazine mesylate are used for the sedation of pigs either on its own, or in combination with sodium pentobarbital or thiopental.

== Pharmacology ==
Mafoprazine
Site	K_{i} (nM)	Species	Ref
D_{2}	10.7	Rat	
α_{1}	12.7	Rat	
α_{2}	101.0	Rat	

It demonstrates activity as a D_{2} dopamine receptor antagonist, an α_{1} adrenergic receptor antagonist, and an α_{2} adrenergic receptor agonist.

The affinity of mafoprazine for D_{2} dopamine receptors is 6 and 16 times lower than that of chlorpromazine and haloperidol, respectively, but 2 times higher than that of azaperone.

The K_{i} for various receptors was determined using rat neuronal receptor binding assays.

== History ==
Mafoprazine was first synthesized in 1988. It is sold as Mafropan® by DS Pharma Animal Health Co. Ltd., Osaka, Japan.
