= Prevention of migraine attacks =

Methods to reduce the frequency and severity of migraine attacks

Preventive (also called prophylactic) treatment of migraine can be an important component of migraine management. The goals of preventive therapy are to reduce the frequency, painfulness, and/or duration of migraine attacks, and to increase the effectiveness of abortive therapy. Another reason to pursue prevention is to avoid medication overuse headache (MOH), otherwise known as rebound headache, which can arise from overuse of pain medications, and can result in chronic daily headache. Preventive treatments of migraine include medications, nutritional supplements, lifestyle alterations, and surgery. Prevention is recommended in those who have headaches more than two days a week, cannot tolerate the medications used to treat acute attacks, or those with severe attacks that are not easily controlled.

== Behavioral interventions ==
Behavioral interventions focus on different methods to change behaviors and can be used alone or along with medications. Exercise for 15–20 minutes per day may be helpful for reducing the frequency of migraine attacks. Recommended lifestyle changes include stopping tobacco use and reducing behaviors that interfere with sleep. Sleep modifications including improving sleep hygiene have been shown to reduce headache frequency in adults with frequent migraines. Diet, visualization, and self-hypnosis are also alternative treatments and prevention approaches. General dietary restriction has not been demonstrated to be an effective approach to treating migraine. Sexual activity has been reported by a proportion of males and females with migraine to relieve migraine pain significantly in some cases. CBT, relaxation training, and mindfulness have also been shown to have some effect on mitigating migraine frequency, albeit with limited data on the changes to quality of life. In children and teens, CBT, relaxation training, and biofeedback techniques may reduce the frequency of migraines. These behavioral interventions do not replace medical treatment, but rather augments them. Migraines can affect an individuals life in plenty areas. However, behavioral interventions can improve the overall wellbeing of an individual; affecting the extent and negative impact of migraines. A systematic review and meta-analysis showed that in children and adolescents, the use of education combined with various behavioral interventions such as CBT, biofeedback, and relaxation-training has greater effectiveness on reducing the frequency of migraines than education alone. However, a 2024 PCORI review found that while these behavioral interventions may reduce migraine frequency, the generalized strength of evidence is low to moderate. Interventions such as biofeedback, acceptance and commitment therapy, and hypnotherapy have not demonstrated enough evidence to determine whether or not they are useful in preventing migraines. In another systematic review, migraine education in adults was also studied as a means for migraine prevention. These studies were unique in that education was used in isolation without any other concurrent treatments. The reports on migraine frequency were mixed, with one study finding a statistically significant effect against education, and another study reporting that there was a reduction in attacks by 6 migraine days/month compared to the control group.

== Medications ==
Preventive drugs are used to reduce the frequency, duration, and severity of migraine attacks. Because of frequent unpleasant and sometimes debilitating side effects, preventive drugs are only prescribed for those migraineurs whose quality of life is significantly adversely affected. The most commonly prescribed drugs for migraine prevention are beta-blockers, antidepressants, and anticonvulsants. The drugs are started at a low dose, which is gradually increased until therapeutic effects develop, the ceiling dose for the chosen drug is reached, or side effects become intolerable.

Preventive migraine medications are considered effective if they reduce the frequency or severity of the migraine attacks by at least 50%. Due to few medications being approved specifically for the preventative treatment of migraine headaches, many medications such as beta-blockers, anticonvulsive agents such as topiramate or sodium valproate, antidepressants such as amitriptyline and calcium channel blockers such as flunarizine are used off label for the preventative treatment of migraine headaches. Guidelines are fairly consistent in rating the anticonvulsants topiramate and divalproex/sodium valproate, and the beta blockers propranolol and metoprolol as having the highest level of evidence for first-line use for migraine prophylaxis in adults. Propranolol and topiramate have the best evidence in children; however, evidence only supports short-term benefit as of 2020.

The beta blocker timolol is also effective for migraine prevention and in reducing migraine attack frequency and severity. While beta blockers are often used for first-line treatment, other antihypertensives also have a proven efficiency in migraine prevention, namely the calcium channel blocker verapamil and the angiotensin receptor blocker candesartan.

Tentative evidence also supports the use of magnesium supplementation. Increasing dietary intake may be better. Recommendations regarding effectiveness varied for the anticonvulsants gabapentin and pregabalin. Frovatriptan is effective for prevention of menstrual migraine.

The antidepressants amitriptyline and venlafaxine are probably also effective. Angiotensin inhibition by either an angiotensin-converting enzyme inhibitor or angiotensin II receptor antagonist may reduce attacks.

Medications in the anti-calcitonin gene-related peptide, including eptinezumab, erenumab, fremanezumab, and galcanezumab, appear to decrease the frequency of migraines by one to two per month.

A 2006 review article by S. Modi and D. Lowder offers some general guidelines on when a physician should consider prescribing drugs for migraine prevention:

Following appropriate management of acute migraine, patients should be evaluated for initiation of preventive therapy. Factors that should prompt consideration of preventive therapy include the occurrence of two or more migraines per month with disability lasting three or more days per month; failure of, contraindication for, or adverse events from acute treatments; use of abortive medication more than twice per week; and uncommon migraine conditions (e.g., hemiplegic migraine, migraine with prolonged aura, migrainous infarction). Patient preference and cost also should be considered. ...Therapy should be initiated with medications that have the highest levels of effectiveness and the lowest potential for adverse reactions; these should be started at low dosages and titrated slowly. A full therapeutic trial may take two to six months. After successful therapy (e.g., reduction of migraine frequency by approximately 50 percent or more) has been maintained for six to 12 months, discontinuation of preventive therapy can be considered.

Preventive medication has to be taken on a daily basis, usually for a few weeks, before the effectiveness can be determined. Supervision by a neurologist is advisable. A large number of medications with varying modes of action can be used. Selection of a suitable medication for any particular patient is a matter of trial and error, since the effectiveness of individual medications varies widely from one patient to the next. Often preventive medications do not have to be taken indefinitely. Sometimes as little as six months of preventive therapy is enough to "break the headache cycle" and then they can be discontinued.

Drugs used to prevent migraine in the UK include: fremanezumab, eptinezumab, erenumab, galcanezumab, botulinium toxin A, topiramate. A meta-analysis suggested that all these drugs reduced the number of days people spent with migraine and that differences in effectiveness between these drugs were modest.

The most effective prescription medications include several drug classes.

=== Beta blockers ===
The beta-blocker propranalol's effectiveness in headache treatment was a chance finding in patients receiving the drug for angina (chest pain due to a lack of blood to the heart muscle). The beta-blockers that are used in migraine treatment are propranolol, nadolol, timolol, metoprolol, and atenolol.

A meta-analysis found that propranolol had an "overall relative risk of response to treatment (here called the 'responder ratio')" was 1.94.

Adverse drug reactions (ADRs) associated with the use of beta blockers include: nausea, diarrhea, bronchospasm, dyspnea, cold extremities, exacerbation of Raynaud's syndrome, bradycardia, hypotension, heart failure, heart block, fatigue, dizziness, alopecia (hair loss), abnormal vision, hallucinations, insomnia, nightmares, sexual dysfunction, erectile dysfunction and/or alteration of glucose and lipid metabolism. Due to the high penetration across the blood–brain barrier, lipophilic beta blockers, such as propranolol and metoprolol, are more likely than other, less lipophilic, beta blockers to cause sleep disturbances, such as insomnia and vivid dreams and nightmares.

=== Neuromodulators ===
Neuromodulators are also referred to as antidepressants when used to treat depression. Amitriptyline has been studied more often than other antidepressants. The 2012 AAN/AHS guideline rates both amitriptyline and venlafaxine as probably effective for migraine prevention. The method of headache prevention with antidepressants is uncertain, but does not result from treating masked depression.

Tricyclic antidepressants (TCAs) such as amitriptyline and the newer selective serotonin reuptake inhibitors (SSRIs) such as fluoxetine are sometimes prescribed. TCAs have been found to be more effective than SSRIs. SSRIs are no more effective than placebo. Another meta-analysis found benefit from SSRIs among patients with migraine or tension headache; however, the effect of SSRIs on only migraines was not separately reported.

The main two side effects that occur from taking amitriptyline are drowsiness and a dry mouth. Other common side effects of using amitriptyline are mostly due to its anticholinergic activity, including: weight gain, changes in appetite, muscle stiffness, nausea, constipation, nervousness, dizziness, blurred vision, urinary retention, and changes in sexual function.

=== Anticonvulsants ===
Anticonvulsant medication is commonly prescribed for migraine prevention, because they have been shown in placebo-controlled double-blind trials to be effective in some migraine sufferers.

Anticonvulsants such as valproic acid and topiramate. A meta-analysis by the Cochrane Collaboration of ten randomized controlled trials or crossover studies, which together included 1341 patients, found anticonvulsants had an "2.4 times more likely to experience a 50% or greater reduction in frequency with anticonvulsants than with placebo" and a number needed to treat of 3.8. However, concerns have been raised about the marketing of gabapentin.

==== Valproate acid ====
Placebo controlled trials of both divalproex sodium and sodium valproate have shown them to be significantly better than placebo at reducing headache frequency. Nausea, vomiting, and gastrointestinal disturbances are the most common side-effects of valproate therapy, and are slightly less common with divalproex sodium than with sodium valproate. The results of a study on the long-term safety of divalproex sodium showed premature discontinuation of the drug in 36% of patients because of either drug intolerance or ineffectivity of the drug.

==== Topiramate ====
Topiramate has been approved by the FDA for prevention of migraine. Studies have shown that it provides significant reductions in the frequency of migraine episodes in patients with 3-12 headaches a month. Adverse reactions related to topiramate treatment occurred in 82.5% of 328 subjects who took part in an extensive trial covering 46 different centres. Most commonly reported were paresthesia (28.8%), upper respiratory tract infection (13.8%, and fatigue (11.9%)

Topiramate has evidence in preventive treatment of chronic migraine.

=== Botulinum toxin ===
Botulinum neurotoxin (Botox) injections have been approved in the US and UK for prevention of chronic migraine, but do not appear to work for episodic migraine. Several invasive surgical procedures are currently under investigation. One involves the surgical removal of specific muscles or the transection of specific cranial nerve branches in the area of one or more of four identified trigger points.

Botulinum toxin (Botox) has evidence in preventive treatment of chronic migraine. Botulinum toxin has been found to be useful in those with chronic migraine but not those with episodic ones.

=== Gepants / Calcitonin gene-related peptide receptor antagonists ===
The main types of CGRP antagonists used in the prevention of migraines are CGRP monoclonal antibodies and CGRP receptor antagonists (gepants). Zavegepant was approved for medical use in the United States in March 2023.

Calcitonin gene-related peptide receptor antagonists (CGRP) target calcitonin gene-related peptide or its receptor to prevent migraine headaches or reduce their severity. CGRP is a signaling molecule as well as a potent vasodilator that is involved in the development of a migraine headache. There are four injectable monoclonal antibodies that target CGRP or its receptor (eptinezumab, erenumab, fremanezumab, and galcanezumab) and the medications have demonstrated efficacy in the preventative treatment of episodic and chronic migraine headaches in phase III randomized clinical trials.

The anti-CGRP monoclonal antibody erenumab was found in one study to decrease chronic migraines by 2.4 days more than placebo.

=== Various herbal drugs ===
==== Butterbur ====
Native butterbur contains some carcinogenic compounds, but a purified version, Petadolex, does not. A systematic review of two trials totalling 293 patients (60 and 233 patients) showed "moderate evidence of effectiveness ... for a higher than the recommended dose of the proprietary Petasites root extract Petadolex in the prophylaxis of migraine."

Among several medicines studied in one analysis, butterbur had the best evidence (as assessed between 1999 and 2009) for its use. Unprocessed butterbur contains chemicals called pyrrolizidine alkaloids (PAs) which can cause liver damage, however there are versions that are PA free. In addition, butterbur may cause allergic reactions in people who are sensitive to plants such as ragweed.

==== Cannabis ====
Cannabis was a standard treatment for migraine from 1874 to 1942. It has been reported to help people through an attack by relieving the nausea and dulling the head pain, as well as possibly preventing the headache completely when used as soon as possible after the onset of pre-migraine symptoms, such as aura.

Feverfew

The plant feverfew (Tanacetum parthenium) is a traditional herbal remedy believed to reduce the frequency of migraine attacks. A number of clinical trials have been carried out to test this claim, but a 2004 review article concluded that the results have been contradictory and inconclusive.

Feverfew has traditionally been used as a treatment for fever, headache and migraine, women's conditions such as difficulties in labour and regulation of menstruation, relief of stomach ache, toothache and insect bites. During the last decades, it has mainly been used for headache and as a preventive treatment for migraine. The plant parts used for medicinal use are the dried leaves or the dried aerial parts. Several historical data supports feverfew's traditional medicinal uses. In addition, several clinical studies have been performed assessing the efficacy and safety of feverfew monotherapy in the prevention of migraine. The majority of the clinical trials favoured feverfew over placebo. The data also suggest that feverfew is associated with only mild and transient adverse effects. The frequency of migraine was positively affected after treatment with feverfew. Reduction of migraine severity was also reported after intake of feverfew and incidence of nausea and vomiting decreased significantly. No effect of feverfew was reported in one study.

Feverfew is registered as a traditional herbal medicine in the Nordic countries under the brand name Glitinum, only powdered feverfew is approved in the Herbal community monograph issued by European Medicines Agency (EMA).

=== Other medications ===
A wide range of other pharmacological drugs have been evaluated to determine their efficacy in reducing the frequency or severity of migraine attacks. These drugs include beta-blockers, calcium antagonists, neurostabalizers, nonsteroidal anti-inflammatory drugs (NSAIDs), tricyclic antidepressants, selective serotonin reuptake inhibitors (SSRIs), other antidepressants, and other specialized drug therapies. The US Headache Consortium lists five drugs as having medium to high efficacy: amitriptyline, divalproex, timolol, propranolol and topiramate. Lower efficacy drugs listed include aspirin, atenolol, fenoprofen, flurbiprofen, fluoxetine, gabapentin, ketoprofen, metoprolol, nadolol, naproxen, nimodipine, verapamil and Botulinum A. Additionally, most antidepressants (tricyclic, SSRIs and others such as Bupropion) are listed as "clinically efficacious based on consensus of experience" without scientific support. Many of these drugs may give rise to undesirable side-effects, or may be efficacious in treating comorbid conditions, such as depression.

- Methysergide was withdrawn from the US market by Novartis, but is available in Canadian pharmacies. Although highly effective, it has rare but serious side effects, including retroperitoneal fibrosis.
- Methylergometrine remains available in the US and is an active metabolite of methysergide. It is thought to carry the same risks and benefits as methysergide but has not been widely studied in migraine.
- Memantine, which is used in the treatment of Alzheimer's Disease, is beginning to be used off label for the treatment of migraine. It has not yet been approved by the FDA for the treatment of migraine.
- Aspirin can be taken daily in low doses such as 80 mg. The blood thinners in ASA have been shown to help some migraineurs, especially those who have an aura.
- Placebo is as effective as adding propranolol to patients not adequately controlled on topiramate. In a randomized controlled trial, both groups reduced their days with migraine by half.
- L-cysteine as a slow release formulation is being studied for migraine prevention.
- Coenzyme Q10: there is tentative evidence that coenzyme Q10 reduces migraine frequency.
- Melatonin: there is tentative evidence for melatonin as an add-on therapy for prevention and treatment of migraine. The data on melatonin are mixed and certain studies have had negative results. The reasons for the mixed findings are unclear but may stem from differences in study design and dosage. Melatonin's possible mechanisms of action in migraine are not completely clear, but may include improved sleep, direct action on melatonin receptors in the brain, and anti-inflammatory properties.

== Medical devices ==
Medical devices, such as biofeedback and neurostimulators, have some advantages in migraine prevention, mainly when common anti-migraine medications are contraindicated or in case of medication overuse. Biofeedback helps people be conscious of some physiological parameters so as to control them and try to relax and may be efficient for migraine treatment. Neurostimulation uses noninvasive or implantable neurostimulators similar to pacemakers for the treatment of intractable chronic migraine with encouraging results for severe cases. A transcutaneous electrical nerve stimulator and a transcranial magnetic stimulator are approved in the United States for the prevention of migraines. There is also tentative evidence for transcutaneous electrical nerve stimulation decreases the frequency of migraines.

=== Transcutaneous electrical nerve stimulation ===
A transcutaneous electrical nerve stimulation device called Cefaly was approved by the Food and Drug Administration (FDA) in the United States on March 11, 2014, for the prevention of migraine; this was the first medical device to get FDA approval for this purpose.

=== Neurostimulation ===
Neurostimulation initially used implantable neurostimulators similar to pacemakers for the treatment of intractable chronic migraine with encouraging good results. But the needed surgery with implantable neurostimulators is limiting the indication to severe cases.

=== Transcranial magnetic stimulation ===
At the 49th Annual meeting of the American Headache Society in June 2006, scientists from Ohio State University Medical Center presented medical research on 47 candidates that demonstrated that TMS — a medically non-invasive technology for treating depression, obsessive compulsive disorder and tinnitus, among other ailments — helped to prevent and even reduce the severity of migraine among its patients. This treatment essentially disrupts the aura phase of migraine before patients develop full-blown migraine attack.

In about 74% of the migraine headaches, TMS was found to eliminate or reduce nausea and sensitivity to noise and light. Their research suggests that there is a strong neurological component to migraine. A larger study will be conducted soon to better assess TMS's complete effectiveness.

=== Alternative therapies ===
Acupuncture has a small effect in reducing migraine frequency, compared to sham acupuncture, a practice where needles are placed randomly or do not penetrate the skin. Physiotherapy, massage and relaxation, and chiropractic manipulation might be as effective as propranolol or topiramate in the prevention of migraine headaches; however, the research had some problems with methodology. Another review, however, found evidence to support spinal manipulation to be poor and insufficient to support its use.

Tentative evidence supports the use of stress reduction techniques such as cognitive behavioral therapy, biofeedback, and relaxation techniques. Regular physical exercise may decrease the frequency. Numerous psychological approaches have been developed that are aimed at preventing or reducing the frequency of migraine in adults including educational approaches, relaxation techniques, assistance in developing coping strategies, strategies to change the way one thinks of a migraine attack, and strategies to reduce symptoms. Other strategies include: progressive muscle relaxation, biofeedback, behavioral training, acceptance and commitment therapy, and mindfulness-based interventions. The medical evidence supporting the effectiveness of these types of psychological approaches is very limited.

=== Biofeedback ===
Biofeedback has been used successfully by some to control migraine symptoms through training and practice. Biofeedback helps patient to be conscious of some physiologic parameters to control them and try to relax. One peer review found that biofeedback could result in a lower frequency of migraine attacks when compared to a combination of CBT and relaxation training. This method is considered to be efficient for migraine prevention.

=== Acupuncture ===
Cochrane reviews have found that acupuncture is effective in the treatment of migraine. The use of "true" acupuncture seems to be slightly more effective than sham acupuncture, however, both "true" and sham acupuncture appear to be at least similarly effective as treatment with preventative medications, with fewer adverse effects.

=== Manual therapy ===
A systematic review stated that chiropractic manipulation, physiotherapy, massage and relaxation might be as effective as propranolol or topiramate in the prevention of migraine headaches; however, the research had some problems with methodology.

== Surgery ==
Some surgical options exist for prevention of migraines, but these are rarely used, or are only used in particular circumstances, such as to close a patent foramen ovale. Migraine surgery, which involves decompression of certain nerves around the head and neck, may be an option in certain people who do not improve with medications. There have been major pharmacological advances for the treatment of migraine headaches, yet patients must still endure symptoms until the medications take effect. Furthermore, often they still experience a poor quality of life despite an aggressive regimen of pharmacotherapy. Migraine surgery techniques have proven most effective in selected patients, often resulting in permanent migraine prevention. The most effective appear to be those involving the surgical cauterization of the superficial blood vessels of the scalp (the terminal branches of the external carotid artery), and the removal of muscles in areas known as "trigger sites".

== Research ==
There is ongoing research in migraine prevention. Standards for the conducts of trials of preventive medications have been proposed by the Task Force of the International Headache Society Clinical Trials Subcommittee.

== See also ==
- Migraine
- Migraine surgery
- Occipital nerve stimulation
- Botulinum toxin
- Chronic migraine
- Headache
- Pain management
- List of neurological disorders
- List of investigational headache and migraine drugs
- XC101-D13H (XC-101)
