= Management of chronic headaches =

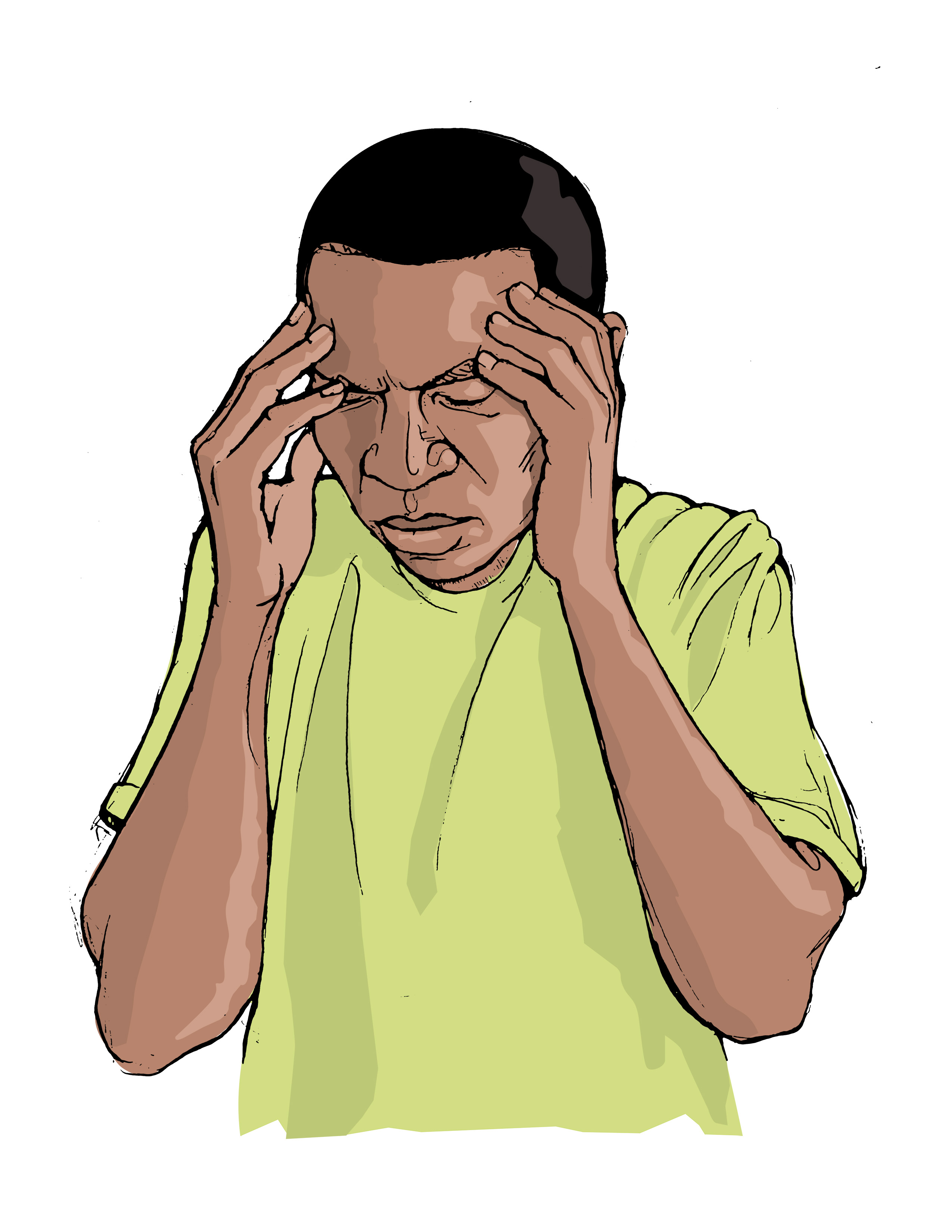
Headache

Chronic headache, or chronic daily headache (CDH), is classified as experiencing fifteen or more days with a headache per month. It is estimated that chronic headaches affect "4% to 5% of the general population". Chronic headaches consist of different sub-groups, primarily categorized as chronic tension-type headaches and chronic migraine headaches. The treatments for chronic headache are vast and varied. Medicinal and non-medicinal methods exist to help patients cope with chronic headache, because chronic headaches cannot be cured. Whether pharmacological or not, treatment plans are often created on an individual basis. Multiple sources recommend multimodal treatment, which is a combination of medicinal and non-medicinal remedies. Some treatments are controversial and are still being tested for effectiveness. Suggested treatments for chronic headaches include medication, physical therapy, acupuncture, relaxation training, and biofeedback. In addition, dietary alteration and behavioral therapy or psychological therapy are other possible treatments for chronic headaches.

== Medicinal ==
=== Analgesic and abortive medications ===
The most common chronic treatment method is the use of medicine. Many people try to seek pain relief from analgesic medicines (commonly termed pain killers), such as aspirin, acetaminophen, aspirin compounds, ibuprofen, and opioids. The long term use of opioids; however, appears to result in greater harm than benefit. Also, abortive medications can be used to "stop a headache once it has begun"; such drugs include CGRP receptor antagonists (Ubrelvy, Nurtec ODT), ergotamine (Cafergot), triptans (Imitrex), and prednisone (Deltasone). However, medical professionals advise that abuse of analgesics and abortive medications can actually lead to an increase in headaches. The painkiller medicines help headaches temporarily, but as the "quick fix" wears off, headaches become more re-current and grow in intensity. These "rebound headaches" can actually make the body less responsive to preventive medication. The conditions keep worsening if one takes paracetamol, aspirin and non-steroidal anti-inflammatory drugs (NSAIDs) for 15 days a month or more. Therefore, those with chronic migraine are left with more migraine days per month than can be safely controlled with analgesic and abortive medications.

=== Preventive medications ===
The most common medicines used to treat chronic (daily) headaches are called prophylactic medicines, which are used to prevent headaches. Such preventive medication is taken on a daily basis, even when a person may not have a headache. Prophylactic medicines are recommended for chronic headache patients because varied experiments prove that the medications "reduce the frequency, severity, and disability associated with daily headaches". A majority of the prophylactic medications work by inhibiting or increasing neurotransmissions in the brain, often preventing the brain from interpreting pain signals.

Preventive medicines include CGRP receptor antagonists, gabapentin (Neurontin), tizanidine (Zanaflex), fluoxetine (Prozac), amitriptyline (Elavil), and topiramate (Topamax). In testing, gabapentin was found to reduce the number of headache days a month by 9.1%. Tizanidine was found to decrease the average frequency of headaches per week, the headache intensity, and the mean headache duration. Through studies, Fluoxetine resulted in better mood ratings and "significant increases in headache-free days". Despite being associated with depression, antidepressants, such as amitriptyline, have been found to effectively treat "near-daily headaches" and numerous chronic pain conditions as well as improving mood and sleep—two possible triggers for people with chronic headaches. One study found that the headache frequency over a 28-day period lowered for chronic headache patients on topiramate. Another medication to prevent headaches is botulinum toxin type A (BoNTA or BOTOX), which is given by injection instead of being taken orally. In a clinical study of botulinum toxin type A, patients participating in the 9-month treatment period with three treatments experienced headache frequency decreases up to 50%. As with all medications, the preventive medications may have side effects. Since different people respond to drugs differently, people with chronic headaches may have to go through a "trial-and-error" period to find the right medications. The previously mentioned medicines can improve headaches, but physicians recommend multiple forms of treatments.

== Non-medicinal ==
=== Physical therapy ===
In addition to medicines, physical therapy is a treatment to help improve chronic headaches. In physical therapy, a patient works together with a therapist to help identify and change physical habits or conditions that affect chronic headaches. Physical therapy for chronic daily headaches focuses on the upper body, including the upper back, neck, and face. Therapists assess and improve the patient's body posture, which can aggravate headaches. During office sessions, therapists use manual therapy, such as a massage, stretching, or joint movement to release muscle tension. Other methods to relax muscles include heat packs, ice packs, and "electrical stimulation". Therapists also teach people with chronic headaches at-home exercises to strengthen and stretch muscles that may be triggering headaches. In physical therapy, the patient must take an active role to practice exercises and make changes to their lifestyle for there to be improvement.

=== Acupuncture ===
Another non-medicinal treatment, which does not require at-home exercises, is acupuncture. Acupuncture involves a certified acupuncturist picking particular points on the body to insert acupuncture needles; these points may differ on an individual basis. With chronic headache patients, the acupuncturist may needle "tender points at or near the site of maximal headache pain". A study conducted by the University of North Carolina School of Medicine found that compared to medicinal treatment alone, medicinal treatment plus acupuncture resulted in more improvement for chronic daily headache patients. Another acupuncture study in Germany found that 52.6% of patients reported a decrease in headache frequency In both studies, acupuncture was not the only treatment. Trials show that acupuncture can cause "relevant improvements" for people with chronic headaches.

=== Relaxation training ===
Relaxation training is another form of non-pharmacological treatment for chronic headache. Relaxation training helps to reduce internal tension, allowing a person to control headaches triggered by stress. The different relaxation methods are normally taught by a psychologist or a therapist. Relaxation training works as people become in tune with their own body, allowing them to realize when it is necessary to decrease tension before a headache occurs. The point of relaxation training is to teach people "an attitude of consciously setting out to relax but not trying too hard", enabling people to relax in everyday situations. Relaxation training includes two different types of methods: physical and mental.

==== Physical methods ====
Physical relaxation methods involve actual body movement or action. One physical method for releasing tension involves "purposefully tensing and then relaxing groups of muscles in a definite sequence", which is named accordingly progressive muscle relaxation. Another physical method of relaxation is deep breathing. Deep breathing is done by breathing from the bottom of the lungs up, which is characterized by the rise and fall of the stomach, not the chest. These are the two most common physical methods of relaxation for people with chronic headaches.

==== Mental methods ====
Also, relaxation therapy can involve mental techniques to decrease body tension. The first is called "focused imagery". Focused imagery involves concentration on relaxed body parts, followed by focus on tense muscles and imagining that the tense areas are being worked on or relaxed. The next mental technique involves focus on the whole body, instead of its individual parts. In "deepening imagery", a person imagines the body's tension as a meter of high to low, and works to reduce tension mentally. An additional mental strategy involves creating and experiencing a location of relaxation in the mind. The last mental strategy involves the chronic headache patient visualizing a place of stress in their life and imagining a relaxed response. Meditation in a relaxing environment is also suggested to prevent headaches. Meditation often involves repeating a one syllable sound or staring at a visual object to help focus attention. Relaxation helps the body to unwind, preventing the formation of headaches.

=== Biofeedback ===
Biofeedback is often used to evaluate the effectiveness of relaxation training, because it feeds back information to the person with chronic headaches about the "body's (biological) current state". One of the most common biofeedback tests is the Electromyograph (EMG), which evaluates the "electrical activity" produced by muscles. Biofeedback also can measure electrical brain activity through a test called the Electroencephalograph (EEG). Another test, called the thermograph, measures skin temperature, because when a person is relaxed they have increased blood flow and a higher temperature. Another method is BVP biofeedback training, which improves chronic headaches by teaching a patient how to regulate and decrease arterial pulse amplitudes by restricting the arteries. When tense, a person's sweat gland activity increases, which is measured by electrodermograph testing of the hands. Biofeedback methods have been proven to work. A study involving fifteen treatment sessions found that biofeedback was "successful in reducing both frequency and severity of headache at discharge and over time". Biofeedback allows people with headaches to identify problems and then seek to reduce them.

=== Changes in diet ===
Many physicians also recommend changes in diet to treat chronic headaches. Many people with chronic headaches fail to recognize foods or beverages as headache factors, because the consumption may not consistently cause headaches or the headaches may be delayed. Many of the chemicals in certain foods can cause chronic headaches, including caffeine, nitrites, nitrates, tyramine, and alcohols. Some of the foods and beverages that people with chronic headaches are advised to avoid include caffeinated beverages, chocolate, processed meats, cheese and fermented dairy products, fresh yeast-risen baked goods, nuts, and alcohol as well as certain fruits and vegetables. Additionally, people may have differing dietary triggers on an individualized basis, because not all foods affect people the same way. Different medical professionals suggest different ways of testing or changing diets. Some may suggest eliminating a few of the potentially headache-causing foods at a time for a short period of time, while others suggest removing all the threatening foods from a person's diet and slowly adding a couple back at a time. Yet, others may not suggest diet modification at all. Reducing salt (sodium) intake is proposed as an effective measure for headache reduction. Nonetheless, findings from a randomized clinical trial suggest that this effect may be mediated by a reduction in blood pressure, indicating that sodium reduction may decrease headache if it significantly lowers blood pressure. The treatment of chronic headaches through changes in diet is based on personal opinion, and, therefore, controversial.

=== Behavioral therapy and psychological therapy ===
Also, behavioral therapy and psychological therapy are suggested treatments to reduce chronic headaches. Behavioral therapy and psychological therapy relate closely in their treatment methods, which include a combination of identifying headache stressors, biofeedback, relaxation training, and cognitive-behavioral therapy. Cognitive-behavioral therapy's purpose "is to identify and resolve the sources of recurrent stress". In treatment studies, patients with medication plus cognitive-behavioral therapy groups did better than groups with medication alone or cognitive-behavioral therapy alone. Psychological and behavioral therapies identify stressful situations and teach chronic headache patients to react differently, change their behavior, or adjust attitudes to reduce tension that leads to headaches. Treatments especially focus on "emotional, mental, behavioral, and social factors" as they impact headaches. Patients are advised to simply avoid stressors when plausible or share their burdens with others. In this way, studies have found that patients with multimodal treatment in a group setting fare better than patients who follow multimodal treatment alone. Another behavioral study, which included multimodal treatment, showed that the "frequency of severe headaches was reduced by a clinically significant amount for 75% of the patients". Behavioral and psychological therapies work to identify and eliminate or reduce stressful situations that lead to chronic headaches.

Beyond behavioral modification, psychological therapy has a few distinct characteristics of its own. It is important to look at the psychological status of a person with chronic headaches to "identify conditions that might interfere with headaches and treatments", such as depression. Also, psychological therapy suggests training in self-hypnosis. While hypnotized, patients are given suggestions to relax and use visual imagery to control headache mechanisms, which is very similar to relaxation therapy. Psychological therapists also analyze personal issues that may interfere in a chronic headache patient's life, making him or her unable to make changes in lifestyle to improve headaches. Psychologist or psychiatric help for chronic headache patients is controversial, as a patient must be open to possible psychological factors in relation to headaches.

=== Chiropractic care ===
Chiropractic care involves in manipulation of the neck and spine to ensure proper alignment. A misalignment can cause headaches along with other problems in the body. The misalignment can compress nerves in the lower neck as well as cause muscle contractions in the neck and headaches can result.

== See also ==
- List of investigational headache and migraine drugs

== Sources ==
- Andrasik, F. "Behavioral Treatment Approaches to Chronic Headache." Neurological Sciences: Official Journal of the Italian Neurological Society and of the Italian Society Of Clinical Neurophysiology 24 Suppl 2 (2003): S80-5.
- Buchholz, David. Heal Your Headache: The 1-2-3 Program for Taking Charge of Your Headaches. New York: Workman, 2002.
- Coeytaux Remy R.; et al. (2005). "A Randomized, Controlled Trial of Acupuncture for Chronic Daily Headache". Headache. 45 (9): 1113–23. doi:10.1111/j.1526-4610.2005.00235.x. PMID 16178942. S2CID 20565745.
- Duckro, Paul N. Taking Control of Your Headaches: How to Get the Treatment You Need. rev ed. New York: Guilford Press, 1999.
- Harpole Linda H.; et al. (2003). "Headache Management Program Improves Outcome for Chronic Headache". Headache. 43 (7): 715–24. doi:10.1046/j.1526-4610.2003.03128.x. PMID 12890125. S2CID 42701821.
- Martin, Paul R. Psychological Management of Chronic Headaches. New York: Guilford Press, 1993.
- Mathew Ninan T (2006). "The Prophylactic Treatment of Chronic Daily Headache". Headache. 46 (10): 1552–64. doi:10.1111/j.1526-4610.2006.00621.x. PMID 17115988. S2CID 24595027.
- Melchart Dieter; et al. (2006). "Acupuncture for Chronic Headaches--an Epidemiological Study". Headache. 46 (4): 632–41. doi:10.1111/j.1526-4610.2006.00365.x. PMID 16643558. S2CID 2455686.
- "Success with Biofeedback found in Chronic Headache Treatment". Journal of Chiropractic Technique. 2 (4): 204. 1990.
