= Peter Goadsby =

Australian neuroscientist and physician

- Born: 24 September 1958
- Education: University of New South Wales, Australia
- Known for: migraine understanding and treatment
- Awards: FRS (2022)
- Scientific career
- Fields: Migraine
- Workplaces: Institute of Neurology, UK; King's College London, UK; University of New South Wales, Australia

Peter Goadsby is an Australian neuroscientist who is Director of the National Institute for Health Research - Wellcome Trust King’s Clinical Research Facility and Professor of Neurology at King's College London. His research has focused particularly on the mechanism and alleviation of migraine and cluster headaches.

== Personal life and education ==
Goadsby was born in Australia in 1958. He attended St Dominic's College, Penrith, a private Catholic school in Western Sydney, and was determined to follow an academic tertiary course. He was interested in politics from a young age, and was planning to study economics at university. However, after an argument with his mother, a mathematics teacher, he applied to study medicine, and was accepted by University of New South Wales. As an undergraduate he met James W. Lance and became interested in the area of experimental science applied to neurology, especially migraine.

== Career ==
Goadsby's research has focused on headaches, trying to understand their mechanisms and how to provide better treatments. His work has especially addressed the causes of migraine and cluster headaches. His research led him to hypothesise that migraine might not be a vascular disease, as was then accepted, or psychosomatic and caused by stress. Instead, he and colleagues developed evidence that it had a nerve-based mechanism that resulted in the pain and other symptoms.

Their work in the 1980s led to the discovery that calcitonin gene-related peptide (CGRP), a peptide involved in neuronal communication, plays a role in the onset of migraines. This provided a new target for drugs, namely those that could interfere with the interaction of CGRP and its receptor. As a result, the gepants such as atogepant have been developed and introduced to clinical use. He was also part of a group that in a clinical trial over six months showed, for the first time, that a monoclonal antibody could significantly reduce frequency and effects of migraine. Several have been introduced into clinical use for those with chronic migraine. Erenumab was approved for use in the USA (in 2018), Scotland from 2019, England (from 2021), and other countries.

He trained in neurophysiology with David Burke. He subsequently trained, worked and studied with Don Reis at Cornell, USA; Jacques Seylaz at Universite VII, Paris, and post-graduate neurology training at the Institute of Neurology, London with C David Marsden, Andrew Lees, Anita Harding and W Ian McDonald. He later returned to Australia. He joined the University of New South Wales and became a consultant neurologist at the Prince of Wales Hospital, Sydney. He was later appointed a Wellcome Senior Research Fellow at the Institute of Neurology and Professor of Clinical Neurology and Honorary Consultant Neurologist at the National Hospital for Neurology and Neurosurgery, London until 2007.

Goadsby was Professor of Neurology, at University of California, San Francisco, 2007-2013. He is also an Honorary Consultant Neurologist at the Great Ormond Street Hospital for Sick Children, UK and Professor of Neurology, University of California, Los Angeles.

== Awards ==
Goadsby was elected a Fellow of the Academy of Medical Sciences in 2016.

He was awarded with the inaugural Lance Gold medal and Oration at the first Lance-Goadsby annual Mind, Migraine, Movement and More Symposium during 2018, organised by Tissa Wijeratne and team in Australia.

In March 2021, Goadsby and his collaborators Lars Edvinsson, Michael Moskowitz and Jes Olesen were awarded the Brain Prize 2021 for their work on the causes and treatment of migraine. The prize is 10 million Danish kroner. He was elected a Fellow of the Royal Society in 2022.

== Publications ==
Goadsby is the author or co-author of many scientific publications and several books and book chapters. These include:

- Peter J. Goadsby, Uwe Reuter, Yngve Hallström, Gregor Broessner, Jo H. Bonner, Feng Zhang, Sandhya Sapra, Hernan Picard, Daniel D. Mikol, and Robert A. Lenz (2017) A controlled trial of erenumab for episodic migraine. New England Journal of Medicine. 377 2123-2132
- A. May, J. Ashburner, C. Büchel, D.J. McGonigle, K.J. Friston, R.S.J. Frackowiak & P.J. Goadsby (1999) Correlation between structural and functional changes in brain in an idiopathic headache syndrome. Nature Medicine 5 836–838
- James W. Lance Mechanism and Management of Headache (London: Butterworths, c. 1969; 3rd ed., 1978; 4th ed., 1982; 6th ed., Boston and Oxford: Butterworth Heinemann, 1999; 7th ed., Oxford: Elsevier Butterworth-Heinemann, 2005). With Peter J. Goadsby as joint editor for 6th ed.
- P. Goadsby, L Edvinsson and Ekman (1990) Vasoactive peptide release in the extracerebral circulation of humans during migraine headache. Annals of Neurology 28 (2) 183-187
