= Arnon Rosenthal =

- ארנון רוזנטל
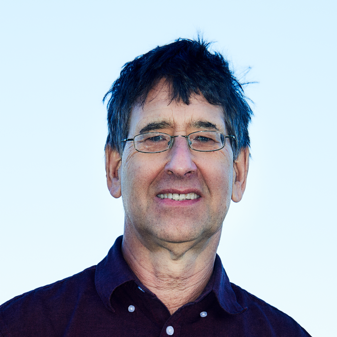
- Rosenthal in 2018
- Education: Hebrew University of Jerusalem
- Known for: Founder, President, and Chief Scientific Officer of Rinat Neuroscience Corporation, Founder and Founding CEO of Annexon Biosciences, Founder, President and CEO of Alector Therapeutics
- Scientific career
- Fields: Neuroscience
- Workplaces: Hebrew University of Jerusalem, National Institute for Medical Research, Genentech, Rinat Neuroscience Corporation, Annexon Biosciences, Alector Therapeutics

Arnon Rosenthal (Hebrew: ארנון רוזנטל) is an Israeli-American neuroscientist, inventor, and biotechnology entrepreneur.

Rosenthal is an inventor and developer of the pain medicine tanezumab, the migraine medicine fremanezumab, the Alzehimer's drug ponezumab and the target for the basal cell carcinoma medicine vismodegib. Rosenthal founded the biotechnology companies Rinat Neuroscience Corporation in 2001 (acquired by Pfizer in 2006); Annexon, which develops anti-complement medicines for autoimmune neuropathies and degenerative eye diseases, in 2011; and Alector, which develops innate immune (neuroimmunology) drugs for dementia and neurodegeneration, in 2013.
