= Dodick =

Dodick is a surname. Notable people with the surname include:

- David W. Dodick (fl. from 1996), neurologist
- Doreen Dodick (born 1932), Canadian politician
