= Howard Fields (neuroscientist) =

American academic (born 1939)

Howard L. Fields
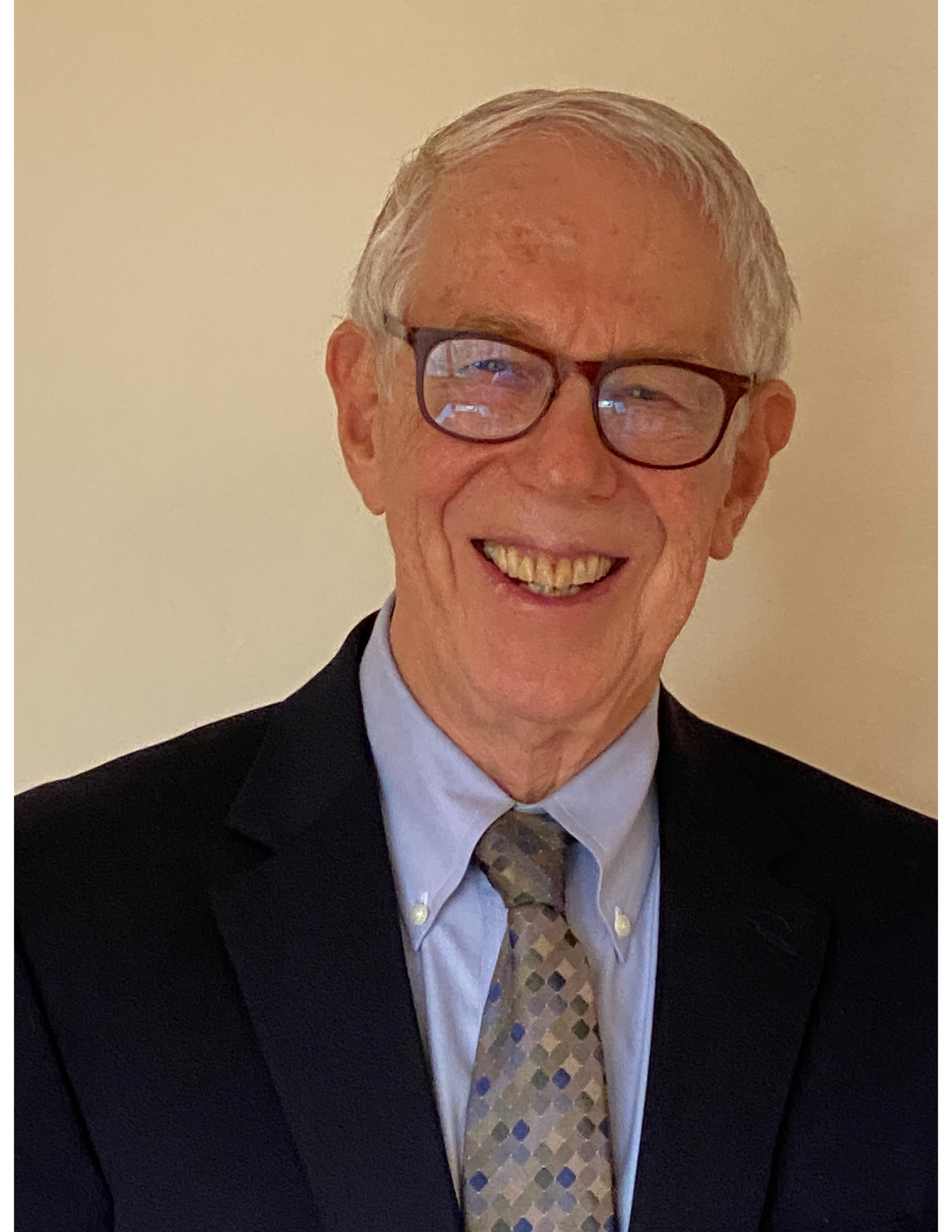
- Born: December 12, 1939; Chicago, Illinois, U.S.
- Died: May 1, 2026 (aged 86); Berkeley, California, U.S.
- Education: University of Chicago (BA); Stanford University (MD) (PhD)
- Occupations: Neuroscientist; Neurologist
- Employer: University of California San Francisco
- Known for: Neurobiology
- Title: Neuroscientist
- Spouse: Carol Margaret Fields

Howard Lincoln Fields (December 12, 1939 - May 1, 2026) was an American neuroscientist and clinical neurologist with expertise in pain and in opioid pharmacology. He was professor of neurology and physiology emeritus at the University of California, San Francisco (UCSF).

== Biography ==
Born in Chicago, Illinois, in 1939, Fields studied physiology at the University of Chicago (BS 1960). In 1965–1966, he received an MD and PhD in neuroscience from Stanford University. He was a graduate student of Donald Kennedy, future President of Stanford University. Fields also held the distinction of being the first person awarded a Neuroscience PhD from Stanford. He completed a medical internship at Bellevue Hospital in New York, then spent three years (1967-1970) as a research neurologist at Walter Reed Army Institute of Research. From 1970-1972, Fields trained at the Harvard neurology program at Boston City Hospital, in Massachusetts. He then joined the faculty of the Neurology and Physiology Departments at the University of California San Francisco where he collaborated with other neuroscientists including Jon Levine and Allan Basbaum.

== Research ==
Fields' research on the nervous system ranged from pain, opioid pharmacology and substance abuse to endogenous opioids in pain relief and reward. Fields was one of the UCSF pain management center founders. With his UCSF colleagues, Fields made major contributions to understanding the neurobiology of pain, opioid analgesia and opioid reward, and to the mechanistic understanding and treatment of neuropathic pain. In addition to discovering and characterizing the inhibitory and excitatory descending brainstem mechanisms that regulate pain, Fields' research identified how activity of nucleus accumbens neurons contributes to motivated behavior for natural and drug rewards. His group with Allan Basbaum described a top-down pain modulating circuit that mediates opioid analgesia and exerts bidirectional control of pain. His group was the first to establish the clinical effectiveness of opioids for neuropathic pain. They also discovered that topical lidocaine was effective to reduce the pain of post-herpetic neuralgia. In other discoveries, Fields with Jon Levine discovered that placebo analgesia was mediated by endogenous opioids by demonstrating that it is blocked by the opioid antagonist naloxone. Later work by Fields and his colleagues led to the discovery of neural mechanisms in the midbrain and striatum that contribute to opioid reward.

Fields’ specialties included neurology, neuropharmacology and neuroscience.

== Awards and honors ==
- 1997 Elected to National Academy of Medicine
- 2000 Cotzias Lecture American Academy of Neurology
- 2006 Raymond D. Adams Lecture American Neurological Association
- 2010 Elected to American Academy of Arts and Sciences
- 2012 Mitchell Max Award for Neuropathic Pain Research American Academy of Neurology

== Publications ==
- Clinical and neuroscience evidence supports the critical importance of patient expectations and agency in opioid tapering. Pain. 2021 Aug 09. Darnall BD, Fields HL. PMID 34382602.
- Pain modulates dopamine neurons via a spinal-parabrachial-mesencephalic circuit. Nat Neurosci. 2021 Aug 09. Yang H, de Jong JW, Cerniauskas I, Peck JR, Lim BK, Gong H, Fields HL, Lammel S. PMID 34373644.
- Onset hyperalgesia and offset analgesia: Transient increases or decreases of noxious thermal stimulus intensity robustly modulate subsequent perceived pain intensity. PLoS One. 2020; 15(12):e0231124. Alter BJ, Aung MS, Strigo IA, Fields HL. PMID 33290407.
- A Midbrain Circuit that Mediates Headache Aversiveness in Rats. Cell Rep. 2019 09 10; 28(11):2739-2747.e4. Waung MW, Margolis EB, Charbit AR, Fields HL. PMID 31509737.
- How expectations influence pain. Pain. 2018 Sep; 159 Suppl 1:S3-S10. Fields HL. PMID 30113941.
- Two delta opioid receptor subtypes are functional in single ventral tegmental area neurons, and can interact with the mu opioid receptor. Neuropharmacology. 2017 Sep 01; 123:420-432. Margolis EB, Fujita W, Devi LA, Fields HL. PMID 28645621.
- Cortico-Accumbens Regulation of Approach-Avoidance Behavior Is Modified by Experience and Chronic Pain. Cell Rep. 2017 05 23; 19(8):1522-1531. Schwartz N, Miller C, Fields HL. PMID 28538173.
- Mu Opioid Receptor Actions in the Lateral Habenula. PLoS One. 2016; 11(7):e0159097. Margolis EB, Fields HL. PMID 27427945.
- Ventral Pallidum Neurons Encode Incentive Value and Promote Cue-Elicited Instrumental Actions. Neuron. 2016 06 15; 90(6):1165-1173. Richard JM, Ambroggi F, Janak PH, Fields HL. PMID 27238868.
- Mu-opioid receptor activation in the medial shell of nucleus accumbens promotes alcohol consumption, self-administration and cue-induced reinstatement. Neuropharmacology. 2016 09; 108:14-23. Richard JM, Fields HL. PMID 27089981.
- Alterations in the rostral ventromedial medulla after the selective ablation of μ-opioid receptor expressing neurons. Pain. 2016 Jan; 157(1):166-173. Harasawa I, Johansen JP, Fields HL, Porreca F, Meng ID. PMID 26335909.
- Endogenous opioid activity in the anterior cingulate cortex is required for relief of pain. J Neurosci. 2015 May 6; 35(18):7264-71. Navratilova E, Xie JY, Meske D, Qu C, Morimura K, Okun A, Arakawa N, Ossipov M, Fields HL, Porreca F. PMID 25948274.
- Understanding opioid reward. Trends Neurosci. 2015 Apr; 38(4):217-25. Fields HL, Margolis EB. PMID 25637939.
- Direct bidirectional μ-opioid control of midbrain dopamine neurons. J Neurosci. 2014 Oct 29; 34(44):14707-16. Margolis EB, Hjelmstad GO, Fujita W, Fields HL. PMID 25355223.
- Neuroscience. More pain; less gain. Science. 2014 Aug 01; 345(6196):513-4. Fields HL. PMID 25082685.
- Parceling human accumbens into putative core and shell dissociates encoding of values for reward and pain. J Neurosci. 2013 Oct 09; 33(41):16383-93. Baliki MN, Mansour A, Baria AT, Huang L, Berger SE, Fields HL, Apkarian AV. PMID 24107968.
- Capturing the aversive state of cephalic pain preclinically. Ann Neurol. 2013 Aug; 74(2):257-65. De Felice M, Eyde N, Dodick D, Dussor GO, Ossipov MH, Fields HL, Porreca F. PMID 23686557.
- Intra-VTA deltorphin, but not DPDPE, induces place preference in ethanol-drinking rats: distinct DOR-1 and DOR-2 mechanisms control ethanol consumption and reward. Alcohol Clin Exp Res. 2014 Jan; 38(1):195-203. Mitchell JM, Margolis EB, Coker AR, Allen DC, Fields HL. PMID 24033469.
- Catechol-O-methyltransferase genotype modulates opioid release in decision circuitry. Clin Transl Sci. 2013 Oct; 6(5):400-3. Mitchell JM, O'Neil JP, Jagust WJ, Fields HL. PMID 24127930.
- Opioid modulation of ventral pallidal afferents to ventral tegmental area neurons. J Neurosci. 2013 Apr 10; 33(15):6454-9. Hjelmstad GO, Xia Y, Margolis EB, Fields HL. PMID 23575843.
