= Rinat Neuroscience Corporation =

Biotechnology company

Rinat Neuroscience Corporation was a privately held biotechnology company that discovered and developed antibody-based drugs, including:

- Tanezumab (codenamed RN624), a monoclonal antibody against nerve growth factor for the treatment of pain
- Ponezumab (codenamed RN1219), a monoclonal antibody against beta amyloid for the treatment of Alzheimer's disease
- Fremanezumab (codenamed TEV-48125, RN307 and LBR-101), a monoclonal antibody against calcitonin gene-related peptide for the treatment of migraines
- Bococizumab (codenamed RN316), a monoclonal antibody against PCSK9 designed to reduce LDL cholesterol
- RN6G, a monoclonal antibody against beta amyloid for the treatment of geographic atrophy in age-related macular degeneration
- RN909, a monoclonal antibody antagonist of the glucagon receptor for type 2 diabetes (T2DM)
- REGN4018, a novel MUC16xCD3 bispecific T-cell engager for the treatment of ovarian cancer
- PF-04518600, a monoclonal antibody targeting OX40 to enhance T cell functions and inhibit tumor growth

Rinat was founded in 2001 by Arnon Rosenthal, who was also Rinat's president, chief scientific office and board director, and Patrick Lynn, following a broad licensing agreement with Genentech, and was acquired by Pfizer in 2006 for approximately $500M. Rinat currently operates as an independent biotechnology unit within Pfizer's Worldwide R&D group in South San Francisco.
