= David W. Dodick =

Neurologist and researcher

- Born: Ontario, Canada
- Education: Dalhousie University
- Occupations: Neurologist; researcher
- Title: Chief Science and Medical Officer, Atria Health Institute; Co-Director, Atria Research Institute
- Board member of: American Brain Foundation; American Headache Society; American Migraine Foundation; Global Patient Advocacy Coalition for Headache; International Headache Society

David W. Dodick is a neurologist and researcher who specializes in concussion, vascular neurology, and migraine. He was the founding director of the Mayo Clinic's concussion and migraine programs. Dodick has been the president of the American Headache Society, as well as the chair of the American Brain Foundation, the American Migraine Foundation, and the Global Patient Advocacy Coalition for Headache. He has also been the president of the International Headache Society and the editor of the organization's journal Cephalalgia. He is the chief science and medical officer of the Atria Health Institute and co-director of the Atria Research Institute.

== Early life and education ==
Dodick was born in Ontario and raised in Sydney, Nova Scotia. His father worked at a steel mill and his mother was a hairdresser. Dodick earned an M.D. from Dalhousie University Faculty of Medicine in 1990, and completed his internship and neurology residency at the Mayo Clinic in Rochester, Minnesota.

== Career ==
Dodick is a neurologist and researcher specializing in concussion, vascular neurology, and migraine. He joined the faculty at Mayo Clinic in Rochester in 1996. In 1998, Dodick joined the faculty at the Mayo Clinic in Scottsdale, Arizona, where he established the headache program. As director of the concussion program, Dodick examined National Football League (NFL) players. In 2010, he was part of a Mayo Clinic working group on concussions in ice hockey to recommend a ban on all head contact by the National Hockey League. In 2012, he supported the NFL Players Association's proposal to have an independent neurologist on the sideline. Dodick co-wrote an editorial that accompanied a study about migraines published by the Journal of the American Medical Association in 2012. In 2015, he was the medical director of the Headache Program and the Sports Neurology and Concussion Program in Phoenix. Dodick continued to work in Scottsdale, as of 2020.

Dodick has been involved in clinical trials for some treatments for migraine including OnabotulinumtoxinA and monoclonal antibodies and small molecules (gepants) that target calcitonin gene-related peptide, a protein that is involved in the development of migraine. As chair of the American Migraine Foundation, he has co-directed the American Registry for Migraine Research as well as national public awareness campaigns such as the '36 Million Migraine' campaign to raise funds for headache research. Dodick is the chief science and medical officer of the Atria Health Institute and co-director of the Atria Research Institute.

=== Board service and recognition ===
In 2010, Dodick was the president of the American Headache Society (AHS). He was the organization's chair in 2014. Dodick has also been the chair of the American Brain Foundation, the American Migraine Foundation, and the Global Patient Advocacy Coalition for Headache. He has been the president of the International Headache Society and was the editor of the organization's journal Cephalalgia from 2009 to 2015. Dodick has co-chaired World Federation of Neurology's World Brain Day committee.

In 2012, the Dalhousie Medical Alumni Association selected Dodick as Alum of the Year, which recognizes physicians "who have made unique and international contributions to clinical practice, teaching, or research". He received a John R. Graham Lecture Award and a Distinguished Service Award from the AHS in 2012 and 2017, respectively. He has received the Distinguished Educator award and has been named an Investigator of the Year, which honors researchers "who have made significant advances that have strongly influenced their fields of research", by the Mayo Clinic.

== Personal life ==
Dodick is married. He is a former junior ice hockey player.

== See also ==
- List of Dalhousie University people

== Select publications ==
- "Chronic Daily Headache". The New England Journal of Medicine. 354 (2): 158–165. January 12, 2006.
- Dodick, David W.; Gargus, J. Jay (August 1, 2008). "Why Migraines Strike". Scientific American.
- Dodick, David W; Schwedt, Todd (January 2009). "Headache: challenging conventional wisdom". The Lancet. 8 (1): 12–4.
- "Restoring invisible and abandoned trials: a call for people to publish the findings". The BMJ. June 28, 2013.
- "Assessing Clinically Meaningful Treatment Effects in Controlled Trials: Chronic Migraine as an Example". The Journal of Pain. 16 (2): 164–175. February 2015.
- "Taking the headache out of migraine". Neurology Clinical Practice. 5 (4): 317–325. August 2015.
- Dodick, David; Silberstein, Stephen (2016). Migraine. Oxford University Press.
- Purdy, R. Allan; Dodick, David W. (May 1, 2017). "Can Anything Stop My Migraine?". Scientific American.
- "Diagnosing Secondary and Primary Headache Disorders". Continuum. 27 (3). American Academy of Neurology: 572–585. June 1, 2021.
- "Ubrogepant for the treatment of migraine attacks during the prodrome: a phase 3, multicentre, randomised, double-blind, placebo-controlled, crossover trial in the USA". The Lancet. 402 (10419): 2, 307–2, 316. December 16, 2023.
