= Allan Ropper =

American neurologist

Allan H. Ropper is an American neurologist and professor of neurology at Harvard Medical School as well as executive vice chair of neurology at Brigham and Women's Hospital in Boston, Mass. In addition to his academic work he is the author of a popular work describing diagnostic neurology, Reaching Down the Rabbit Hole, co-authored with Brian Burrell. A further popular work co-authored by Ropper and Burrell, How the Brain Lost Its Mind, appeared in 2019.

Ropper was influenced by Harvard neurologists Raymond Adams and Miller Fisher.

He has been the lead editor of the most recent editions of Adams & Victors' Principles of Neurology, a popular neurology textbook, now in its eleventh edition.
