= Cephalalgia =

Cephalalgia may refer to:

- Headache, pain in the region of the head or neck
- Cephalalgia (journal), a medical journal of the International Headache Society
