= Howard Fields =

Howard Fields may refer to:

- Howard Fields (gridiron football)
- Howard Fields (neuroscientist)
- Howard Fields (musician)
