= Lance–Adams syndrome =

Sequela of hypoxic encephalopathy

Lance–Adams syndrome (LAS) is a sequela of hypoxic encephalopathy due to respiratory arrest, airway obstruction, cardiac arrest, etc., several days after the onset of hypoxic encephalopathy. A condition that presents with functional myoclonus associated with increased cortical excitability in a few weeks. It was first reported by James Lance and Raymond Adams in 1963.

It is a disease that presents myoclonus as a sequela of hypoxic disorders in the brain due to asphyxiation and cardiopulmonary arrest. It is exacerbated by mental and physical anxiety such as intention, intentional movement, and tension.

== Pathology ==
It appears due to basal ganglia lesions due to hypoxic encephalopathy.

== Treatment ==
Clonazepam and Valproate, which enhance serotonin and GABAA receptor, are widely used as therapeutic agents . It has been reported that Levetiracetam was effective in cases in which clonazepam and valproic acid were ineffective. Other reports have shown that piracetam has been shown to be effective.

=== Perampanel ===
From around 2017, reports that Perampanel are effective have been gathered, and cases of complete cure have been reported.

In April 2021, a group at Kyoto University reported a case of Lance–Adams syndrome 11 years after onset due to hypoxic encephalopathy caused by a bronchial asthma attack, and in March 2022, a group at Kitasato University reported a case of Lance–Adams syndrome after a hanging neck injury 1 year and 6 months after onset. There are an increasing number of reports showing improvement even in chronic cases, such as a case report of a patient who was able to hold a standing position after treatment with perampanel and significant improvement in motor myoclonus.
