= James W. Lance =

Australian neurologist (1926–2019)

James W. Lance AO, CBE
- Born: 19 October 1926; Wollongong, Australia
- Died: 20 February 2019 (aged 92); Australia
- Other names: James Waldo Lance; James Lance
- Education: Geelong Grammar School; The King's School
- Alma mater: University of Sydney
- Known for: Headache research; Migraine research
- Scientific career
- Fields: Neurology
- Workplaces: National Hospital for Neurology and Neurosurgery; Sydney Hospital; Massachusetts General Hospital; University of New South Wales, Prince Henry Hospital, Sydney, Prince of Wales Hospital (Sydney)

James Waldo Lance AO, CBE (1926–2019), often referred to as James Lance and James W. Lance, was an Australian neurologist. He was the founder of the School of Neurology at the University of New South Wales and president of the International Headache Society in 1987–89, and a "world authority on the diagnosis and treatment" of headache and migraine.

== Early life and education ==
Lance was born in Wollongong, New South Wales on 29 October 1926. His parents operated a local department store in Wollongong. His maternal grandfather, James Douglas Stewart, was professor of veterinary science at the University of Sydney and a member of the CSIRO.

He was sent to study at Tudor House School, Moss Vale, in the Southern Highlands of the New South Wales (having been sent there in the hope of the fresh air would alleviate his asthma) and then at Geelong Grammar School and The King's School, Parramatta.

Lance studied medicine at the University of Sydney, from which he graduated as MBBS in 1950.

== Sydney, London, Boston ==
In the years 1950–51 he was resident medical officer at the Royal Prince Alfred Hospital and in 1952–53 he took up a fellowship at the National Health and Medical Research Council at Sydney University, graduating with a Doctor of Medicine degree.

In 1954 Lance trained in London, United Kingdom as a neurologist and then worked as assistant house physician at the National Hospital (now known as the National Hospital for Neurology and Neurosurgery) in Queen Square, London.

Returning to Sydney, he worked as a tutor (1956–60) at St Paul’s College and a visiting lecturer (1956–62) at Sydney University, then at the Northcott Neurological Centre, Cammeray (1956–57), Sydney Hospital (1956–61) and St Luke’s Hospital, Elizabeth Bay (1957–61).

In 1960 he travelled to the United States where he undertook research at the Massachusetts General Hospital in Boston.

== University of New South Wales ==
In 1961 he joined the just established School of Medicine at the University of New South Wales was the founder of the Department of Neurology. He was to stay at this university for his whole academic career (1961–92), beginning as senior lecturer, and being later appointed as associate professor, as professor of neurology (with a personal chair), and finally as Professor Emeritus.

During this period he also saw patients at the Prince Henry and Prince of Wales Hospitals (1961–92) and served as foundation director of the Institute of Neurological Sciences (1990–91).

In 1980 he was elected as a Fellow of the Australian Academy of Science.

== Scientific achievements ==
Following early physiology experiments with special reference to the corticospinal (pyramidal) tract, Lance published a paper in the 1950s on an "attempt to regrow the severed pyramidal tract" and "restore movement to paralysed limbs".

While at the Northcott Neurological Centre, having noted that "less than 50% of migraine sufferers" were receiving effective treatment from their healthcare providers, he undertook to analyse 500 case histories of migraine and vascular headache patients. This "Herculean task" resulted in a paper published in 1960 that is now recognised as a "citation classic".

While in Massachusetts in 1963, he worked with the neurologist Raymond Adams on post-hypoxic myoclonus (now called the Lance-Adams syndrome).

During his period at the Prince Henry Hospital, he conducted research on the physiology of migraine, with special reference to serotonin and its "effects on blood vessels and brain pathways involved in pain". This work led to the "groundbreaking" discovery of the triptan family of drugs, including (after collaborative research with the United Kingdom's Glaxo) of sumatriptan, the first clinically available triptan (on the market since 1991) and a key medicine now used to resolve acute migraine attacks.

== Awards and honours ==
- 1977: CBE
- 1991: AO
- 1992: Hon. DSc. (University of New South Wales)
- 2001: Centenary Medal
- 2018: Professor Tissa Wijeratne and Professor Peter Goadsby got together in 2018 to launch the annual Lance-Goadsby Symposium in recognition of his work with immediate acceptance of this event as a global neuroscience educational activity.

== Personal life ==
James Lance was married for almost 70 years to Judy and they had five children.

He died on 20 February 2019.

== Select bibliography ==
- Mechanism and Management of Headache (London: Butterworths, c. 1969; 3rd ed., 1978; 4th ed., 1982; 6th ed., Boston and Oxford: Butterworth Heinemann, 1999; 7th ed., Oxford: Elsevier Butterworth-Heinemann, 2005). (Joint editor for 6th ed.: Peter J. Goadsby.)
- A Physiological Approach to Clinical Neurology (London: Butterworths, 1970; Oxford: Elsevier Science, 3rd ed., 2014.). (Joint author for 3rd ed.: James G. McLeod.)
- Introductory Neurology, Melbourne: Blackwell Scientific Publications, 1989. Joint author: James G. McLeod.
- Migraine and Other Headaches, Sydney: Simon & Schuster Australia, 1999.
- The Golden Trout, Thomas Nelson, 1977.
