= Asterixis =

- Other names: Flapping tremor, liver flap
- Specialty: Neurology

Asterixis is a movement disorder that results in jerking of the hands or feet while attempting to hold a position. The resemblance of the hands to flapping wings gives it the colloquial name "flapping tremor" although it is a negative myoclonus rather than a tremor.

The disorder is caused by abnormal function of the diencephalic motor centers in the brain, which regulate the muscles involved in maintaining position. Asterixis is associated with various encephalopathies due especially to faulty metabolism. The term derives from the Greek a, meaning "not" and stērixis, meaning "support" or "stable position".

== Presentation ==
Asterixis is normally asymptomatic and found during clinical examination for other reasons, but more rarely it can also be the leading symptom. Usually there are brief, arrhythmic interruptions of sustained voluntary muscle contraction, causing brief lapses of posture with a frequency of 3–5Hz. It is typically bilateral, but may be asymmetric. Unilateral asterixis may occur with structural brain disease.

To elicit the sign, the patient should be asked to hold constant posture against gravity. This can be done by extending the arms at 90° to the body and extending the wrists with the fingers spread. This position should be held for at least 30 seconds, and in that duration the examiner should look for intermittent loss of posture in the fingers, wrists or arms.

== Associated conditions ==
Possible causes for asterixis are:

- Hepatic encephalopathy (for which the term was firstly described). The inability of the liver to metabolize ammonia to urea damages the brain cells. The cause is thought to be predominantly related to abnormal ammonia metabolism.
- Other metabolic encephalopathies (often in conjunction with drowsiness or stupor), especially in decompensated cirrhosis or acute liver failure.
- Kidney failure and azotemia.
- Wilson's disease.
- Respiratory failure due to carbon dioxide toxicity (hypercapnia) or low oxygen (hypoxemia)
- Electrolyte imbalances, such as hypokalaemia and hypomagnesaemia.
- Encephalopathies, such as Creutzfeldt-Jakob disease
- Structural brain problems, like haemorrhage and neoplasia, which usually cause contraleteral one-sided asterixis.
- Some drugs, particularly phenytoin (when it is known as phenytoin flap). Other drugs implicated include benzodiazepines, salicylates, barbiturates, valproate, gabapentin, lithium, ceftazidime, and metoclopramide.

== History ==
R. D. Adams and J. M. Foley first described asterixis in 1949 in patients with severe liver failure and encephalopathy. Initially Foley and Adams referred to asterixis simply as "tremor" but realized that they needed a more appropriate term. On a literature search they found a poorly described phenomenon in similar patients mentioned by German physicians called “jactitations” but the reference was vague. Foley consulted Father Cadigan, a Jesuit classics scholar, who suggested “anisosterixis” (an "negative"–iso "equal"–sterixis "firmness") but Foley shortened this to asterixis due to the former being too difficult to pronounce. They introduced the term in 1953 by way of a medical abstract and later Adams solidified its medical use as he was an author and editor of the widely influential Harrison's Principles of Internal Medicine.
