= Allan Basbaum =

American medical researcher (born 1947)

Allan I. Basbaum
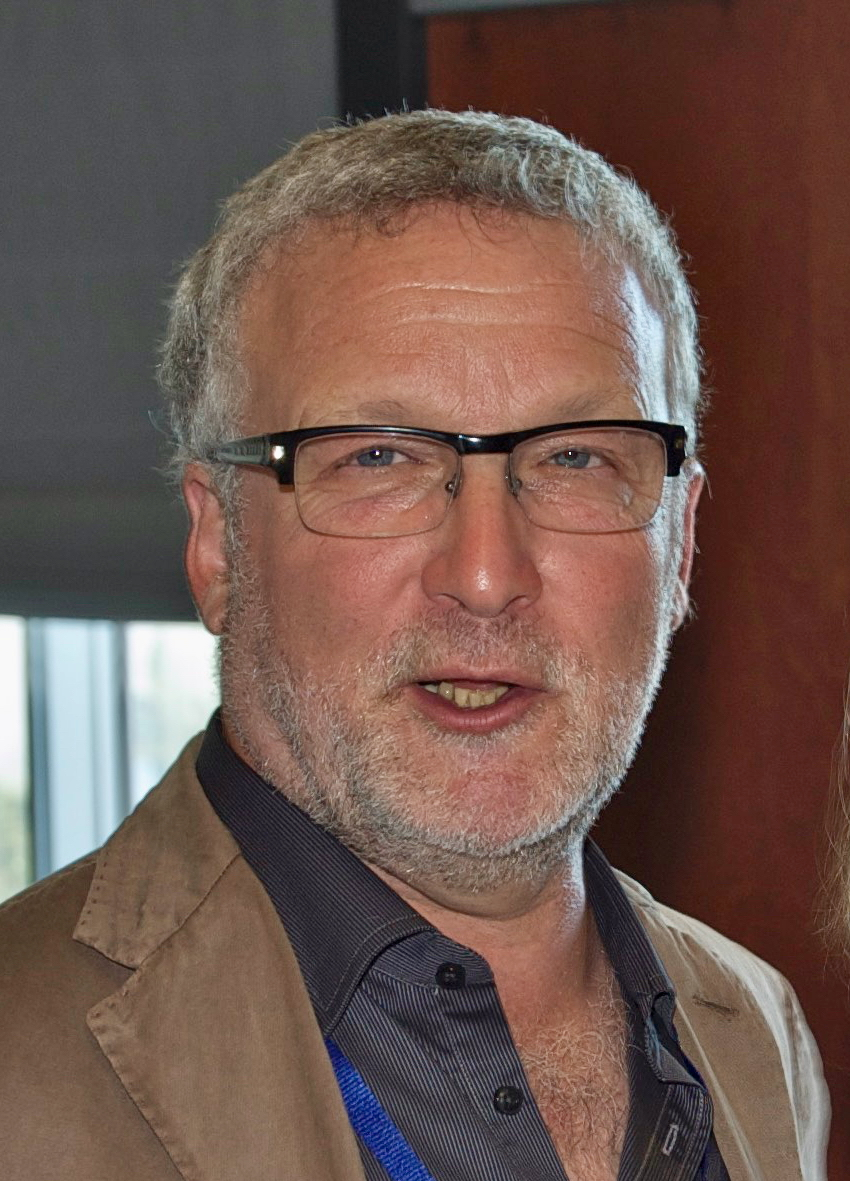
- Born: October 18, 1947 (age 78); Montreal, Quebec, Canada
- Education: McGill University (BSc); University of Pennsylvania (PhD)
- Occupation: Neuroscientist
- Employer: University of California San Francisco
- Known for: Neurobiology of Pain
- Title: Neuroscientist

Allan Irwin Basbaum is a Canadian-American medical researcher, and professor and chair of the Department of Anatomy at the University of California, San Francisco. He is a Fellow of the American Academy of Arts and Sciences. He is a member of the Institute of Medicine. and a Fellow of the Royal Society in the United Kingdom. From 2003 to 2012 he was editor-in-chief of Pain, the journal of the International Association for the Study of Pain. He was elected a member of the National Academy of Sciences in April 2019.

== Education ==
BSc - McGill University, Montreal, Quebec, Canada
PhD - University Pennsylvania, Philadelphia, PA
PostDoc - University College London, London, UK
PostDoc - University California San Francisco, San Francisco, CA
