= Tanezumab =

Chemical compound

Monoclonal antibody
- Type: Whole antibody
- Source: Humanized (from mouse)
- Target: Nerve growth factor (NGF)

Clinical data
- Other names: RN624
- ATC code: N02BG12 (WHO)

Identifiers
- CAS Number: 880266-57-9
- DrugBank: DB12335
- ChemSpider: none
- UNII: EQL0E9GCX1

Chemical and physical data
- Formula: C_{6464}H_{9942}N_{1706}O_{2026}S_{46}
- Molar mass: 145445.32 g·mol^{−1}

Tanezumab (INN, codenamed RN624) is a monoclonal antibody against nerve growth factor as a treatment for pain via a novel mechanisms different from conventional pain-killer drugs. Tanezumab was discovered and developed by Rinat Neuroscience and was acquired by Pfizer in 2006.

In 2009 there was a Phase III trial for knee pain due to osteoarthritis (OA). Another Phase III trial for hip pain in OA was halted in June 2010 when some patients needed hip replacement.

Tanezumab is undergoing Phase II clinical trials for the treatment of various pain entities, including chronic low back pain, bone cancer pain, and interstitial cystitis.

In March 2012, the Anti-NGF Testing - FDA Committee voted in favor of a continuation of the development of nerve-blocking medications, as long as certain safety precautions were observed.

A Phase III trial published in 2013 found tanezumab was superior to placebo for painful hip osteoarthritis.

At February 19, 2019 the co-development partners - Eli Lilly and Pfizer - announced that treatment with tanezumab 10 mg met the primary endpoint, demonstrating a statistically significant improvement in chronic low back pain at 16 weeks compared to placebo (however, 5 mg arm demonstrated a numerical improvement in pain, but did not reach statistical significance compared to placebo at the week 16 analysis).

== Society and culture ==
=== Legal status ===
On 16 September 2021, the Committee for Medicinal Products for Human Use (CHMP) of the European Medicines Agency (EMA) recommended the refusal of the marketing authorization for tanezumab (Raylumis), a medicine intended for the treatment of pain associated with osteoarthritis.

On 25 March 2021, the FDA Joint Arthritis Advisory Committee and Drug Safety and Risk Management Advisory Committee voted 1 to 19 against the question on whether the proposed risk evaluation and mitigation strategy (REMS) for tanezumab will ensure its benefits outweigh its risks.

== See also ==
- List of investigational analgesics
