= Zavegepant =

Medication for treatment of migraine

Clinical data
- Trade names: Zavzpret
- Other names: BHV-3500
- License data: US DailyMed: Zavegepant
- Routes of administration: Nasal
- Drug class: Calcitonin gene-related peptide receptor antagonist
- ATC code: N02CD08 (WHO)

Legal status
- Legal status: US: ℞-only

Identifiers
- IUPAC name: N-[(2R)-3-(7-methyl-1H-indazol-5-yl)-1-[4-(1-methylpiperidin-4-yl)piperazin-1-yl]-1-oxopropan-2-yl]-4-(2-oxo-1,2-dihydroquinolin-3-yl)piperidine-1-carboxamide
- CAS Number: 1337918-83-8; as HCl: 1414976-20-7
- PubChem CID: 53472683; as HCl: 134819878
- DrugBank: DB15688
- ChemSpider: 30814207
- UNII: ODU3ZAZ94J; as HCl: 000QCM6HAL
- KEGG: D11898; as HCl: D11899
- ChEBI: CHEBI:229643
- ChEMBL: ChEMBL2397415; as HCl: ChEMBL4650220
- CompTox Dashboard (EPA): DTXSID101352039

Chemical and physical data
- Formula: C_{36}H_{46}N_{8}O_{3}
- Molar mass: 638.817 g·mol^{−1}
- 3D model (JSmol): Interactive image
- SMILES: CC1=CC(=CC2=C1NN=C2)CC(C(=O)N3CCN(CC3)C4CCN(CC4)C)NC(=O)N5CCC(CC5)C6=CC7=CC=CC=C7NC6=O
- InChI: InChI=1S/C36H46N8O3/c1-24-19-25(20-28-23-37-40-33(24)28)21-32(35(46)43-17-15-42(16-18-43)29-9-11-41(2)12-10-29)39-36(47)44-13-7-26(8-14-44)30-22-27-5-3-4-6-31(27)38-34(30)45/h3-6,19-20,22-23,26,29,32H,7-18,21H2,1-2H3,(H,37,40)(H,38,45)(H,39,47)/t32-/m1/s1; Key:JJVAPHYEOZSKJZ-JGCGQSQUSA-N; Key:VQDUWCSSPSOSNA-RYWNGCACSA-N

Zavegepant, sold under the brand name Zavzpret, is a medication used for the treatment of migraine. Zavegepant is a calcitonin gene-related peptide receptor antagonist. It is sprayed into the nose. It is sold by Pfizer.

The most common adverse reactions include taste disorders, nausea, nasal discomfort, and vomiting.

Zavegepant was approved for medical use in the United States in March 2023.

== Medical uses ==
Zavegepant is indicated for the acute treatment of migraine with or without aura in adults.
