= Raymond Delacy Adams =

American neurologist

- Born: February 13, 1911; Portland, Oregon
- Died: October 18, 2008 (aged 97); Boston
- Education: University of Oregon
- Occupations: American Neurologist and Neuropathologist

Raymond Delacy Adams (February 13, 1911 – October 18, 2008) was an American neurologist, neuropathologist, Bullard Professor of Neuropathology at Harvard Medical School and chief of neurology at Massachusetts General Hospital. Along with neurologist Maurice Victor, Adams was the author of Adams and Victor's Principles of Neurology, the 12th edition of which appeared, 50 years after the original.

Born near Portland, Oregon, Adams was the son of William Henry Adams and Eva Mabel Morriss. He graduated from the University of Oregon with a degree in Psychology. He received his M.D. from the Duke University School of Medicine in 1936. Adams became chief of neurology at Massachusetts General in 1951 retiring in 1977. Adams had an encyclopedic knowledge of adult neurology, pediatric neurology, and neuropathology and is widely regarded as a pre-eminent neurologist of the mid-20th century. He was elected a Fellow of the American Academy of Arts and Sciences in 1955. He helped found the Eunice Kennedy Shriver Center for Mental Retardation.

Writing together with the founder of the neuropathology lab at the Massachusetts General Hospital Charles S. Kubik, Adams wrote clinico-pathological papers, one in 1946 describing occlusion of the basilar artery, and another in 1952 comparing and contrasting the demyelinating diseases including acute and chronic multiple sclerosis. In 1949, together with Joseph Michael Foley he described negative myoclonus and in 1953 they coined the term asterixis. In 1959, Adams and colleagues first described central pontine myelinolysis, a disease stripping the myelin insulation from axons within the brain, but distinct from multiple sclerosis. Together with the Australian neurologist James Waldo Lance he described posthypoxic myoclonus, later called Lance-Adams syndrome. Adams, in collaboration with Canadian neurologist Dr. C. Miller Fisher, made contributions to the field of cerebrovascular disease, the syndrome of "transient global amnesia" in 1964, and in 1965 he published an article in the New England Journal of Medicine describing the syndrome of "normal pressure hydrocephalus". In 1964 he clinically and pathologically distinguished an atypical Parkinsonian syndrome, striato-nigral degeneration, now considered an α-synucleinopathy under the umbrella term multiple system atrophy. His 1965 paper with Drs. M. Victor and M. Cole describing the effects on the brain of liver failure and of porto-systemic shunting of venous intestinal blood around the liver has been cited over 500 times in the medical literature.

Adams died in Boston of complications from congestive heart failure, aged 97.

== Personal life ==
Adams married M. Elinor Clark in 1933. Elinor taught high school, received her MA in romance languages from the University of North Carolina in 1936 and received her PhD in romance languages from Harvard University in 1966. They had four children. In 1974 he married Maria Zabnienska Salam, a pediatric neurologist from Lebanon.
