= Atogepant =

Chemical compound

Clinical data
- Trade names: Qulipta, Aquipta
- Other names: AGN-241689, MK-8031
- AHFS/Drugs.com: Monograph
- MedlinePlus: a621052
- License data: US DailyMed: Atogepant
- Pregnancy category: AU: B3
- Routes of administration: By mouth
- ATC code: N02CD07 (WHO)

Legal status
- Legal status: AU: S4 (Prescription only); CA: ℞-only; US: ℞-only; EU: Rx-only

Identifiers
- IUPAC name: (3S)-N-[(3S,5S,6R)-6-methyl-2-oxo-1-(2,2,2-trifluoroethyl)-5-(2,3,6-trifluorophenyl)piperidin-3-yl]-2-oxospiro[1H-pyrrolo[2,3-b]pyridine-3,6'-5,7-dihydrocyclopenta[b]pyridine]-3'-carboxamide
- CAS Number: 1374248-81-3
- PubChem CID: 72163100
- DrugBank: DB16098
- ChemSpider: 59718640
- UNII: 7CRV8RR151
- KEGG: D11313
- ChEBI: CHEBI:196955
- ChEMBL: ChEMBL3991065
- CompTox Dashboard (EPA): DTXSID901337079

Chemical and physical data
- Formula: C_{29}H_{23}F_{6}N_{5}O_{3}
- Molar mass: 603.525 g·mol^{−1}
- 3D model (JSmol): Interactive image
- SMILES: C[C@@H]1[C@H](c2c(F)ccc(F)c2F)C[C@H](NC(=O)c2cnc3c(c2)C[C@@]2(C3)C(=O)Nc3ncccc32)C(=O)N1CC(F)(F)F
- InChI: InChI=1S/C29H23F6N5O3/c1-13-16(22-18(30)4-5-19(31)23(22)32)8-20(26(42)40(13)12-29(33,34)35)38-25(41)15-7-14-9-28(10-21(14)37-11-15)17-3-2-6-36-24(17)39-27(28)43/h2-7,11,13,16,20H,8-10,12H2,1H3,(H,38,41)(H,36,39,43)/t13-,16-,20+,28+/m1/s1; Key:QIVUCLWGARAQIO-OLIXTKCUSA-N

Atogepant, sold under the brand name Qulipta among others, is a medication used to prevent migraines. It is a gepant, a calcitonin gene-related peptide receptor antagonist administered orally.

The most common side effects include nausea, constipation, tiredness, somnolence (sleepiness), decreased appetite, and decreased weight.

Atogepant was approved for medical use in the United States in September 2021, and in the European Union in August 2023.

== Medical uses ==
Atogepant is indicated for the preventive treatment of episodic migraine in adults.

In the European Union, atogepant (Aquipta) is indicated for prophylaxis (prevention) of migraine in adults who have at least four migraine days per month.

== History ==
Atogepant was developed by the biopharmaceutical company AbbVie. The benefits and side effects of atogepant were evaluated in two clinical trials of 1,562 participants with a history of migraine headaches occurring on 4 to 14 days per month. The two trials to show the benefits were designed similarly. Trials 1 and 2 assigned participants to one of several doses of atogepant or placebo daily for three months. Neither the participants nor the health care providers knew which treatment was being given until after the trial was completed. The benefit of atogepant was assessed based on the change from baseline in the number of migraine days per month to the last month of the three-month treatment period, comparing participants in the atogepant and placebo groups. The trials were conducted at over 100 sites in the United States. The safety of atogepant was evaluated in 1,958 participants with migraine who received at least one dose of atogepant; therefore, the number of participants representing efficacy findings may differ from the number of participants representing safety findings due to different pools of study participants analyzed for efficacy and safety.

The UK’s National Institute for Health and Care Excellence has issued draft guidance recommending atogepant for preventing episodic and chronic migraine in NHS patients. It's approved for those experiencing at least 4 migraine days per month after failing 3 prior treatments. Atogepant costs £463 monthly but includes a confidential discount.

== Research ==
Atogepant demonstrated efficacy in two phase 3 trials (ADVANCE and PROGRESS) by significantly reducing monthly migraine days, acute medication use, and improving quality of life in patients with episodic and chronic migraine over 12 weeks compared to placebo. Common side effects included nausea, constipation, and fatigue/somnolence.

A study presented at the 2023 meeting for the American Academy of Neurology also showed that atogepant may help prevent migraines in patients who have had no prior success with other preventative drugs.
