= Ubrogepant =

Medication for migraine headache acute treatment

Clinical data
- Trade names: Ubrelvy
- Other names: MK-1602
- AHFS/Drugs.com: Monograph
- MedlinePlus: a620016
- License data: US DailyMed: Ubrogepant
- Routes of administration: By mouth
- ATC code: N02CD04 (WHO)

Legal status
- Legal status: CA: ℞-only; US: ℞-only

Pharmacokinetic data
- Protein binding: 87% (in vitro)
- Elimination half-life: 5–7 hours
- Excretion: fecal/biliary

Identifiers
- IUPAC name: (6S)-N-[(3S,5S,6R)-6-Methyl-2-oxo-5-phenyl-1-(2,2,2-trifluoroethyl)-3-piperidinyl]-2'-oxo-1',2',5,7-tetrahydrospiro[cyclopenta[b]pyridine-6,3'-pyrrolo[2,3-b]pyridine]-3-carboxamide
- CAS Number: 1374248-77-7
- PubChem CID: 68748835
- DrugBank: DB15328
- ChemSpider: 28536135
- UNII: AD0O8X2QJR
- KEGG: D10673
- ChEMBL: ChEMBL2364638
- CompTox Dashboard (EPA): DTXSID00160178

Chemical and physical data
- Formula: C_{29}H_{26}F_{3}N_{5}O_{3}
- Molar mass: 549.554 g·mol^{−1}
- 3D model (JSmol): Interactive image
- SMILES: C[C@@H]1[C@H](c2ccccc2)C[C@H](NC(=O)c2cnc3c(c2)C[C@@]2(C3)C(=O)Nc3ncccc32)C(=O)N1CC(F)(F)F
- InChI: InChI=1S/C29H26F3N5O3/c1-16-20(17-6-3-2-4-7-17)11-22(26(39)37(16)15-29(30,31)32)35-25(38)19-10-18-12-28(13-23(18)34-14-19)21-8-5-9-33-24(21)36-27(28)40/h2-10,14,16,20,22H,11-13,15H2,1H3,(H,35,38)(H,33,36,40)/t16-,20-,22+,28+/m1/s1; Key:DDOOFTLHJSMHLN-ZQHRPCGSSA-N

Ubrogepant, sold under the brand name Ubrelvy, is a medication used for the acute (immediate) treatment of migraine with or without aura (a sensory phenomenon or visual disturbance) in adults. It is not indicated for the preventive treatment of migraine. Ubrogepant is a small-molecule calcitonin gene-related peptide receptor antagonist. It is the first drug in this class approved for the acute treatment of migraine.

The most common side effects are nausea, tiredness and dry mouth. Ubrogepant is contraindicated for co-administration with strong CYP3A4 inhibitors.

== History ==
Ubrogepant was discovered by Merck and is first described in a patent application prioritized in 2010.

The effectiveness of ubrogepant for the acute treatment of migraine was demonstrated in two randomized, double-blind, placebo-controlled trials. In these studies, 1,439 adult patients with a history of migraine, with and without aura, received the approved doses of ubrogepant to treat an ongoing migraine. In both studies, the percentages of patients achieving pain relief two hours after treatment (defined as a reduction in headache severity from moderate or severe pain to no pain) and whose most bothersome migraine symptom (nausea, light sensitivity or sound sensitivity) stopped two hours after treatment were significantly greater among patients receiving ubrogepant (19–21% depending on the dose) compared to those receiving placebo (12%). Patients were allowed to take their usual acute treatment of migraine at least two hours after taking ubrogepant. 23% of patients were taking a preventive medication for migraine.

In December 2019, the US Food and Drug Administration approved Ubrelvy produced by Allergan USA, Inc. for treatment of migraine after onset.
