= Rimegepant =

Medication for acute migraine in adults

Clinical data
- Trade names: Nurtec ODT, Vydura
- Other names: BHV-3000, BMS-927711
- AHFS/Drugs.com: Monograph
- MedlinePlus: a620031
- License data: US DailyMed: Rimegepant
- Pregnancy category: AU: B1
- Routes of administration: By mouth
- Drug class: Calcitonin gene-related peptide receptor antagonist
- ATC code: N02CD06 (WHO)

Legal status
- Legal status: AU: S4 (Prescription only); CA: ℞-only; US: ℞-only; EU: Rx-only; In general: ℞ (Prescription only)

Identifiers
- IUPAC name: [(5S,6S,9R)-5-Amino-6-(2,3-difluorophenyl)-6,7,8,9-tetrahydro-5H-cyclohepta[b]pyridin-9-yl] 4-(2-oxo-3H-imidazo[4,5-b]pyridin-1-yl)piperidine-1-carboxylate
- CAS Number: 1289023-67-1
- PubChem CID: 51049968
- DrugBank: DB12457
- ChemSpider: 27289072
- UNII: 997WVV895X
- KEGG: D10663; D10662
- ChEMBL: ChEMBL2178422
- CompTox Dashboard (EPA): DTXSID70156003

Chemical and physical data
- Formula: C_{28}H_{28}F_{2}N_{6}O_{3}
- Molar mass: 534.568 g·mol^{−1}
- 3D model (JSmol): Interactive image
- SMILES: N[C@@H]1c2cccnc2[C@H](OC(=O)N2CCC(n3c(=O)[nH]c4ncccc43)CC2)CC[C@H]1c1cccc(F)c1F
- InChI: InChI=1S/C28H28F2N6O3/c29-20-6-1-4-17(23(20)30)18-8-9-22(25-19(24(18)31)5-2-12-32-25)39-28(38)35-14-10-16(11-15-35)36-21-7-3-13-33-26(21)34-27(36)37/h1-7,12-13,16,18,22,24H,8-11,14-15,31H2,(H,33,34,37)/t18-,22+,24-/m0/s1; Key:KRNAOFGYEFKHPB-ANJVHQHFSA-N

Rimegepant, sold under the brand name Nurtec ODT among others, is a medication used for the acute treatment of migraine with or without aura in adults and the prophylactic treatment of episodic migraine in adults. It is taken by mouth to dissolve on or under the tongue. It works by blocking CGRP receptors.

In the United States, rimegepant was approved for treating acute migraine in February 2020, and its approval was extended to preventing episodic migraine in June 2021. It is produced and marketed by Pfizer. In March 2021, rimegepant was approved for medical use in the United Arab Emirates and in Israel. It was approved for medical use in Canada in December 2023. In the United Kingdom, rimegepant is approved by NICE for the prophylaxis and treatment of acute migraine in adults. In 2023, it was the 206th most commonly prescribed medication in the United States, with more than 2 million prescriptions .

== Medical uses ==
Rimegepant is indicated for the treatment of acute migraine with or without aura in adults and for the preventative treatment of episodic migraine in adults.

== Mechanism of action ==
Rimegepant is a small molecule calcitonin gene-related peptide (CGRP) receptor antagonist.

== History ==
Rimegepant was developed by Biohaven Pharmaceuticals, which markets the drug in the United States after receiving FDA approval in February 2020. Approval was based on evidence from one clinical trial of 1,351 subjects with migraine headaches.

== Society and culture ==
=== Legal status ===
In February 2022, the Committee for Medicinal Products for Human Use (CHMP) of the European Medicines Agency (EMA) adopted a positive opinion, recommending the granting of a marketing authorization for the medicinal product Vydura, intended for the prophylaxis and acute treatment of migraine. The applicant for this medicinal product is Biohaven Pharmaceutical Ireland DAC. Rimegepant was approved for medical use in the European Union in April 2022.

=== Economics ===
Pfizer reported revenue of US$928 million for Nurtec ODT/Vydura in 2023.

Marketing

American singer, songwriter and actress Lady Gaga is featured in advertisements for rimegepant, under the Nurtec ODT brand. Her involvement sparked criticism of the role of celebrities in pharmaceutical endorsements.

Former Formula One driver Romain Grosjean drove Pfizer sponsored car with a Nurtec ODT livery during his rookie season the NTT IndyCar Series.
