= Cephalalgia (journal) =

- Discipline: Neurology
- Language: English
- Edited by: Arne May

Publication details
- History: 1981–present
- Publisher: SAGE Publications
- Frequency: 16/year
- Impact factor: 6.292 (2020)

Standard abbreviations
- ISO 4: Cephalalgia

Indexing
- CODEN: CEPHDF
- ISSN: 0333-1024 (print); 1468-2982 (web)
- OCLC no.: 904498743

Links
- Journal homepage; Online access; Online archive

Cephalalgia: An International Journal of Headache is a peer-reviewed medical journal covering research on headaches. It is published by SAGE Publications on behalf of the International Headache Society; it was previously published by Blackwell Publishing. The journal was established in 1981 and currently has 16 issues per year. The editor-in-chief is Arne May.

== Abstracting and indexing ==
The journal is abstracted and indexed in MEDLINE, Scopus, the Science Citation Index, Current Contents/Clinical Medicine, Current Contents/Life Sciences, and BIOSIS Previews. According to the Journal Citation Reports, its 2020 impact factor is 6.292.
