= Fremanezumab =

Pharmaceutical biological monoclonal antibody

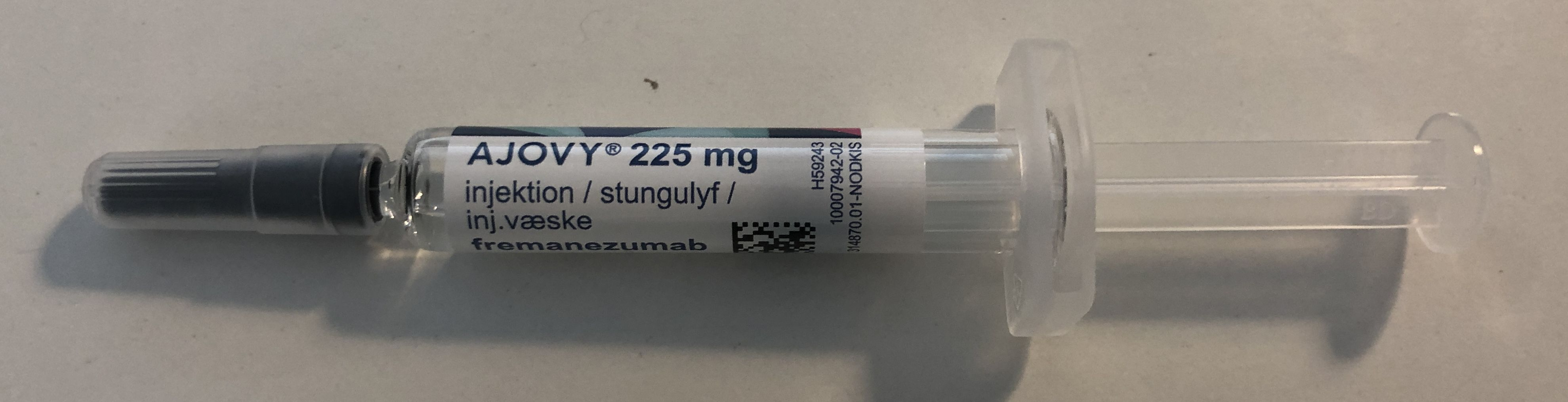
- A Norwegian syringe of fremanezumab

Monoclonal antibody
- Type: Whole antibody
- Source: Humanized
- Target: Calcitonin gene-related peptide (CGRP) α, β

Clinical data
- Trade names: Ajovy
- Other names: TEV-48125, fremanezumab-vfrm
- AHFS/Drugs.com: Monograph
- MedlinePlus: a618053
- License data: US DailyMed: Fremanezumab
- Pregnancy category: AU: B1
- Routes of administration: Subcutaneous
- Drug class: Calcitonin gene-related peptide antagonist
- ATC code: N02CD03 (WHO)

Legal status
- Legal status: AU: S4 (Prescription only); CA: ℞-only / Schedule D; UK: US: ℞-only; EU: Rx-only; In general: ℞ (Prescription only)

Identifiers
- CAS Number: 1655501-53-3
- DrugBank: DB14041
- ChemSpider: none
- UNII: PF8K38CG54
- KEGG: D11055

Chemical and physical data
- Formula: C_{6470}H_{9952}N_{1716}O_{2016}S_{46}
- Molar mass: 145507.54 g·mol^{−1}

Fremanezumab, sold under the brand name Ajovy, is a medication used to prevent migraines. It is given by subcutaneous injection (injection under the skin).

The most common side effect is pain and redness at the site of injection. Other side effects include allergic reactions. It is a calcitonin gene-related peptide antagonist.

It was approved for medical use in the United States in 2018, the European Union in 2019, the United Kingdom in 2020, and Argentina by September 2021.

== Medical uses ==
Fremanezumab is indicated for the preventive treatment of migraine in adults; and the preventive treatment of episodic migraine in children who are aged 6 to 17 years of age and who weigh 45 kilograms (99 lb) or more.

Fremanezumab was shown to be effective in adults with four or more attacks per month.

== Adverse effects ==
The most common adverse reactions are located at the injection site, which occurred in 43 to 45% of people in studies (as compared to 38% under placebo). Hypersensitivity reactions occurred in fewer than 1% of patients.

== Interactions ==
Fremanezumab does not interact with other antimigraine drugs such as triptans, ergot alkaloids and analgesics. It is expected to generally have a low potential for interactions, because it is not metabolized by cytochrome P450 enzymes.

== Pharmacology ==
=== Mechanism of action ===
Fremanezumab is a fully humanized monoclonal antibody directed against calcitonin gene-related peptides (CGRP) alpha and beta. It potently and selectively binds to CGRPs, which prevents binding to receptors.

=== Pharmacokinetics ===
After subcutaneous injection, fremanezumab has a bioavailability of 55–66%. Highest concentrations in the body are reached after five to seven days. Like other proteins, the substance is degraded by proteolysis to small peptides and amino acids, which are reused or excreted via the kidney. The elimination half-life is estimated to be 31 days.

== Chemistry ==
Fremanezumab is a humanized monoclonal antibody. It is produced using recombinant DNA in Chinese hamster ovary cells.

== History ==
Fremanezumab was discovered and developed by Rinat Neuroscience, was acquired by Pfizer in 2006, and was then licensed to Teva. It was approved by the US Food and Drug Administration in September 2018. In March 2019, fremanezumab was approved for marketing and use in the European Union.
