= Ponezumab =

Monoclonal antibody

Monoclonal antibody
- Type: Whole antibody
- Source: Humanized (from mouse)
- Target: beta-amyloid

Clinical data
- ATC code: none

Identifiers
- CAS Number: 1178862-65-1
- ChemSpider: none
- UNII: 1TG15H1XE9
- KEGG: D09952

Chemical and physical data
- Formula: C_{6552}H_{10158}N_{1730}O_{2090}S_{52}
- Molar mass: 148272.48 g·mol^{−1}

Ponezumab is a humanized monoclonal antibody designed for the treatment of Alzheimer's disease.

Ponezumab was developed by Pfizer Inc. In November 2011 Pfizer halted the development of ponezumab after finishing a phase 2 trial.
