= Headache (journal) =

- Discipline: Neurology
- Language: English
- Edited by: Amy A. Gelfand MD, MAS, FAHS

Publication details
- History: 1961-present
- Publisher: Wiley-Blackwell
- Frequency: 10/year
- Impact factor: 4.041 (2021)

Standard abbreviations
- ISO 4: Headache

Indexing
- CODEN: HEADAE
- ISSN: 0017-8748 (print); 1526-4610 (web)
- LCCN: 68050139
- OCLC no.: 423537515

Links
- Journal homepage; Online access; Online archive

Headache: The Journal of Head and Face Pain is a peer-reviewed medical journal covering all aspects of head and face pain. It is the official journal of the American Headache Society (https://americanheadachesociety.org). It was established in 1961 and is published ten times per year by Wiley-Blackwell. The editor-in-chief is Amy A. Gelfand MD, MAS, FAHS (University of California at San Francisco). According to the Journal Citation Reports, the journal has a 2021 impact factor of 4.041, ranking it 45th out of 204 journals in the category "Clinical Neurology".

== Abstracting and indexing ==
The journal is indexed in several bibliographic databases, including:

- Science Citation Index Expanded (Clarivate)
- EBSCO
- Scopus (ELSEVIER),
- Natural Science Collection (ProQuest)
