= Amylin receptor =

Heterodimer of the calcitonin receptor

The amylin receptors (AMYRs) are a family of 3 receptors that are activated by amylin, a peptide hormone secreted together with insulin. They are each composed of a copy of the calcitonin receptor (CTR) bound to a receptor activity-modifying protein (RAMP), forming a heterodimer. They consist of AMY_{1} (RAMP1 with CTR), AMY_{2} (RAMP2 with CTR), and AMY_{3} (RAMP3 with CTR).

Activation of these receptors appears to have a number of effects on eating behavior, including triggering feelings of satiation, reducing food intake, decreasing fat storage, and increasing energy usage. These effects have led to research into targeting these receptors with treatments for metabolic diseases and obesity.

The amylin receptors are G protein-coupled receptor of the secretin receptor family. Consistent with their calcitonin receptor subunit, they appear to activate Gs alpha subunit pathways, and there have also been reports of Gq alpha subunit coupling. However, methodological difficulties related to amylin’s ability to bind with the calcitonin receptor have led some researchers to express uncertainty about these results.

== Ligands ==
The AMYRs are bound by amylin with high affinity, and by calcitonin with relatively lower affinity. In humans, calcitonin gene-related peptide (CGRP) is a selective agonist with a greater affinity towards AMY_{1} than AMY_{3}, while its affinity for AMY_{2} isn’t well understood.

Drugs that mimic Amylin to activate amylin receptors (called Amylin receptor agonists) are being developed as therapies for diabetes and obesity, and one, pramlintide, has been FDA approved as a treatment for diabetes.

CGRP receptor antagonists which are being developed for migraine, may also act as antagonists for AMY_{1}, which could be playing a role in their effects. Dual agonists of the amylin and calcitonin receptors (DACRAs) are under development for obesity. Amylin and its receptors are believed to play a role in Alzheimer's disease.

== See also ==
- CALCRL
