= Calcitonin gene-related peptide 1 =

Hormone found in humans

CALCA
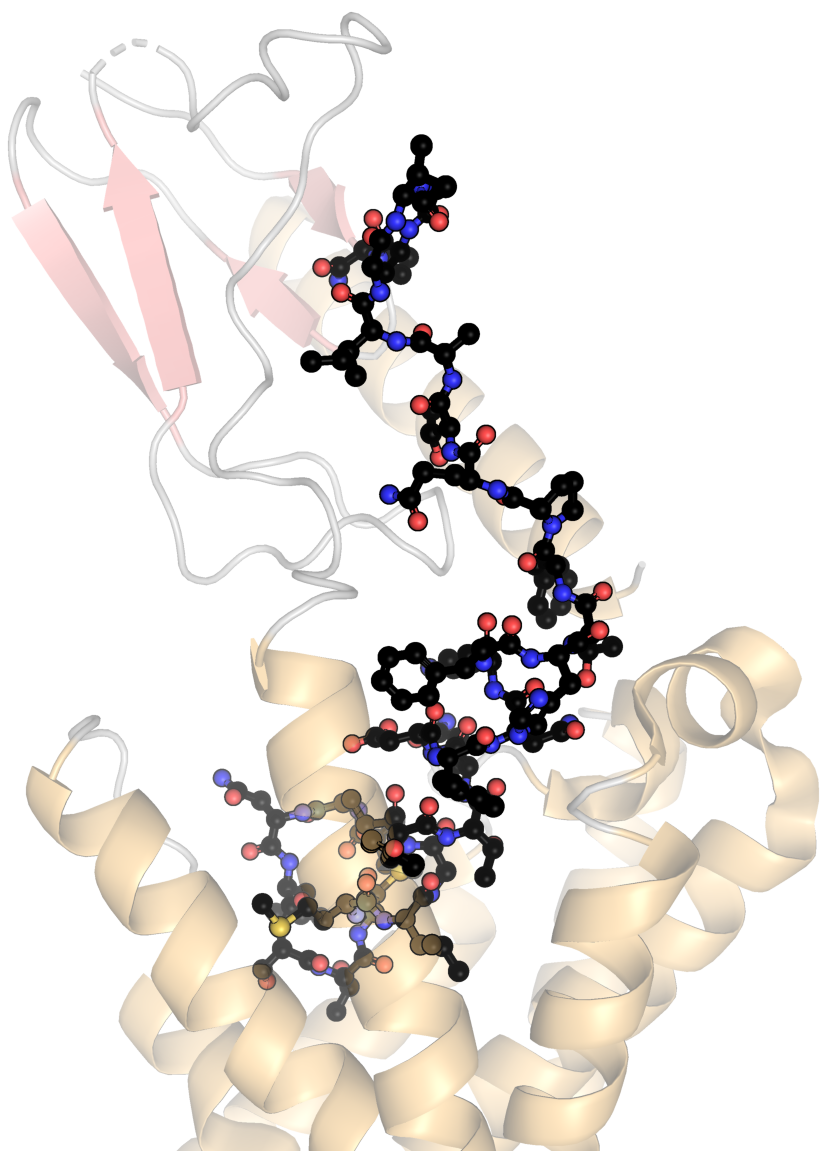

Identifiers
- Aliases: CALCA, CT, CGRP-I, CGRP-alpha, KC, PCT, calcitonin related polypeptide alpha, CGRP, CGRP1, CALC1
- External IDs: OMIM: 114130; MGI: 2151253; GeneCards: CALCA
Available structures
PDB	Ortholog search: PDBe RCSB
PDB	List of PDB id codes 2JXZ,%%s1LS7

Gene location (Human)
Chr.	Chromosome 11 (human)
Band	11p15.2	Start	14,966,668 bp
Band	11p15.2	End	14,972,351 bp

Gene location (Mouse)
Chr.	Chromosome 7 (mouse)
Band	7 F1|7 59.99 cM	Start	114,230,713 bp
Band	7 F1|7 59.99 cM	End	114,235,592 bp
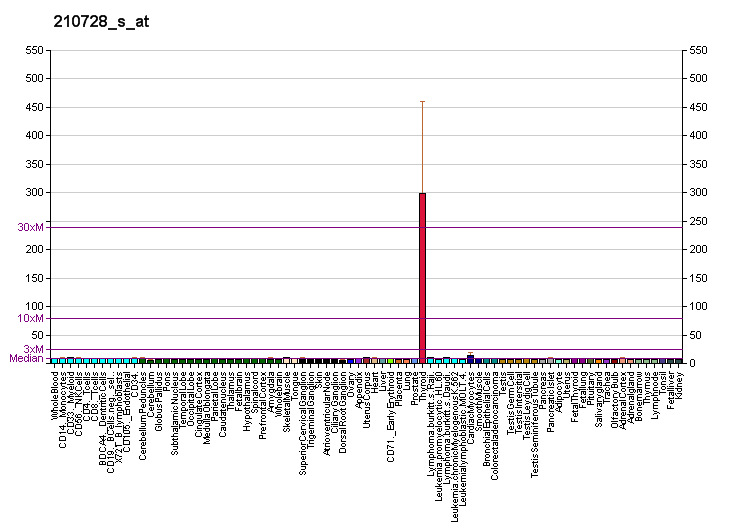

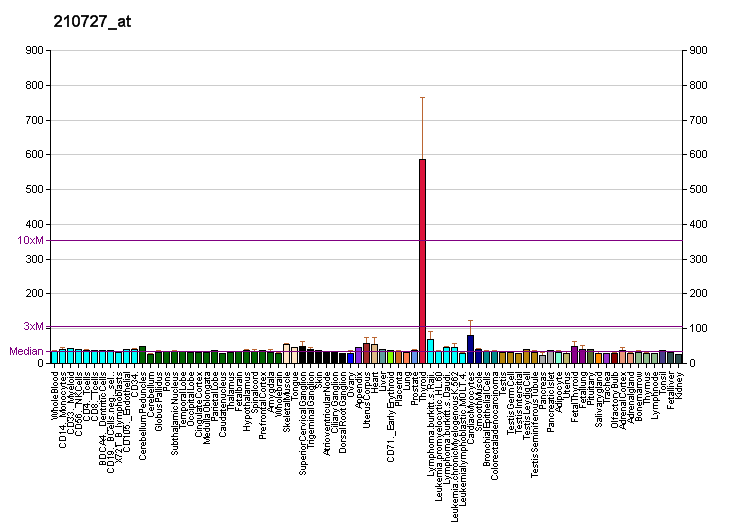

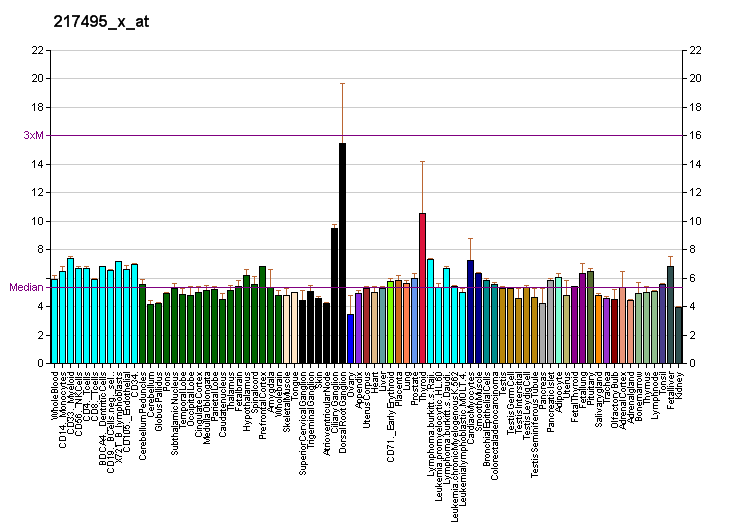
RNA expression pattern
Bgee	Human / Mouse (ortholog); Top expressed in: spinal ganglia; trigeminal ganglion; quadriceps femoris muscle; vastus lateralis muscle; cerebellar vermis; islet of Langerhans; human kidney; Epithelium of choroid plexus; tibialis anterior muscle; right lobe of liver / Top expressed in: facial motor nucleus; motor neuron; lumbar spinal ganglion; anterior horn of spinal cord; lactiferous gland; trachea; trigeminal ganglion; embryo; embryo; vestibular membrane of cochlear duct; More reference expression data
BioGPS	More reference expression data
Gene ontology
Molecular function	hormone activity; calcitonin receptor binding; protein binding; identical protein binding; signaling receptor binding; protein-containing complex binding
Cellular component	cytoplasm; intracellular anatomical structure; extracellular region; axon; terminal bouton; soma; neuron projection; nucleus; extracellular space
Biological process	cellular response to nerve growth factor stimulus; positive regulation of cytosolic calcium ion concentration involved in phospholipase C-activating G protein-coupled signaling pathway; negative regulation of smooth muscle contraction; regulation of heart contraction; monocyte chemotaxis; negative regulation of blood pressure; positive regulation of cytosolic calcium ion concentration; cellular response to tumor necrosis factor; ageing; vasodilation; cellular calcium ion homeostasis; response to heat; negative regulation of nervous system process; positive regulation of ossification; activation of adenylate cyclase activity; regulation of heart rate; detection of temperature stimulus involved in sensory perception of pain; negative regulation of ossification; response to pain; artery vasodilation involved in baroreceptor response to increased systemic arterial blood pressure; feeding behavior; inflammatory response; neuropeptide signaling pathway; negative regulation of transcription, DNA-templated; activation of protein kinase activity; embryo implantation; negative regulation of bone resorption; regulation of signaling receptor activity; G protein-coupled receptor signaling pathway; adenylate cyclase-activating G protein-coupled receptor signaling pathway; regulation of cytosolic calcium ion concentration; leukocyte cell-cell adhesion; G protein-coupled receptor internalization; positive regulation of interleukin-1 alpha production; response to yeast; negative regulation of osteoclast differentiation; cell-cell signaling; antibacterial humoral response; positive regulation of macrophage differentiation; receptor internalization; regulation of blood pressure; protein phosphorylation; vasculature development; defense response to Gram-negative bacterium; endothelial cell proliferation; positive regulation of interleukin-8 production; nervous system process involved in regulation of systemic arterial blood pressure; negative regulation of calcium ion transport into cytosol; innate immune response; endothelial cell migration; antifungal humoral response; defense response to Gram-positive bacterium; antimicrobial humoral immune response mediated by antimicrobial peptide; amylin receptor signaling pathway; calcitonin gene-related peptide receptor signaling pathway
Sources:Amigo / QuickGO
Orthologs
Databases	NCBI: entry; OMA: entry
Species	Human	Mouse
Entrez	796	12310
Ensembl	ENSG00000110680	ENSMUSG00000030669
UniProt	P01258; P06881	P70160; Q99JA0
RefSeq (mRNA)	NM_001033952; NM_001033953; NM_001741; NM_001378949; NM_001378950	NM_001033954; NM_007587; NM_001289444; NM_001305616
RefSeq (protein)	NP_001029125.1	NP_001029126; NP_001276373; NP_001292545; NP_031613; NP_001029126.1 NP_001276373.1
Location (UCSC)	Chr 11: 14.97 – 14.97 Mb	Chr 7: 114.23 – 114.24 Mb
PubMed search
- Wikidata
View/Edit Human	View/Edit Mouse

Calcitonin gene-related peptide 1 (CGRP1), also called calcitonin-related polypeptide alpha, is a hormone that in humans is encoded by the CALCA gene. This calcitonin gene-related peptide triggers vasodilation (relaxation/widening of blood vessels), and also signals to platelets. It differs from the highly similar peptide hormone, calcitonin gene-related peptide 2, by its high expression in the central and peripheral nervous system, rather than the enteric nervous system.

== Receptors ==
CGRP1's vasodilation effects occur through activation of the CGRP receptor, which is a heterodimer composed of CALCRL bound to RAMP1. It can also activate the amylin receptor 1, a receptor composed of a CALCR subunit bound to RAMP1.

== Related hormones ==
The gene CALCA is notable for producing three distinct hormones with different effects. In addition to CGRP1, an alternative splicing encodes a precursor protein that is cleaved into calcitonin and katacalcin, which both function to reduce blood calcium levels.

In addition to CGRP1, there is a second calcitonin gene-related peptide called CGRP2. This peptide is encoded by a separate gene, CALCB, but shares 90%+ homology (differing by 3 amino acids in humans). CGRP1 is traditionally considered the primary CGRP in the central and peripheral nervous system, while CGRP2 is mainly in the enteric nervous system.
