= Calcitonin gene-related peptide 2 =

Hormone found in humans

CALCB

Identifiers
- Aliases: CALCB, CALC2, CGRP-II, CGRP2, calcitonin related polypeptide beta
- External IDs: OMIM: 114160; MGI: 2151253; GeneCards: CALCB

Gene location (Human)
Chr.	Chromosome 11 (human)
Band	11p15.2	Start	14,904,997 bp
Band	11p15.2	End	15,082,342 bp

Gene location (Mouse)
Chr.	Chromosome 7 (mouse)
Band	7 F1|7 59.99 cM	Start	114,230,713 bp
Band	7 F1|7 59.99 cM	End	114,235,592 bp
RNA expression pattern
Bgee	Human / Mouse (ortholog); Top expressed in: spinal ganglia; trigeminal ganglion; islet of Langerhans; gonad; testicle; hypothalamus; anterior pituitary; body of pancreas; muscle layer of sigmoid colon; retinal pigment epithelium / Top expressed in: facial motor nucleus; motor neuron; lumbar spinal ganglion; anterior horn of spinal cord; lactiferous gland; trachea; trigeminal ganglion; embryo; embryo; vestibular membrane of cochlear duct; More reference expression data
BioGPS	n/a
Gene ontology
Molecular function	neuropeptide hormone activity; hormone activity; calcitonin receptor binding
Cellular component	extracellular region; extracellular space; intracellular anatomical structure
Biological process	cellular calcium ion homeostasis; signal transduction; regulation of signaling receptor activity; G protein-coupled receptor signaling pathway; adenylate cyclase-activating G protein-coupled receptor signaling pathway; regulation of cytosolic calcium ion concentration
Sources:Amigo / QuickGO
Orthologs
Databases	NCBI: entry; OMA: entry
Species	Human	Mouse
Entrez	797	12310
Ensembl	ENSG00000175868	ENSMUSG00000030669
UniProt	P10092	P70160; Q99JA0
RefSeq (mRNA)	NM_000728	NM_001033954; NM_007587; NM_001289444; NM_001305616
RefSeq (protein)	NP_000719	NP_001029126; NP_001276373; NP_001292545; NP_031613; NP_001029126.1 NP_001276373.1
Location (UCSC)	Chr 11: 14.9 – 15.08 Mb	Chr 7: 114.23 – 114.24 Mb
PubMed search
- Wikidata
View/Edit Human	View/Edit Mouse

Calcitonin gene-related peptide 2 (CGRP2), also called calcitonin related polypeptide beta, is a hormone that in humans is encoded by the CALCB gene (previously CALC2). Like the related hormone, calcitonin gene-related peptide 1 (CGRP1), this hormone induces vasodilation (relaxation of blood vessels) through the activation of the CGRP receptor. However, this calcitonin gene-related peptide differs from CGRP1 by tissue expression. It is traditionally considered to be the primary form used in the enteric nervous system (nervous system in the gut), whereas CGRP1 is more highly expressed in the central and peripheral nervous system.

The gene that encodes CGRP1, CALCA, also encodes the blood-calcium-reducing hormone calcitonin, but despite its name, CGRP2 is encoded by a distinct gene (CALCB).

== Receptors ==
This hormone activates the CGRP receptor, which is a two protein (heterodimer) complex that is composed of RAMP1 and CALCRL.
