= Eloralintide =

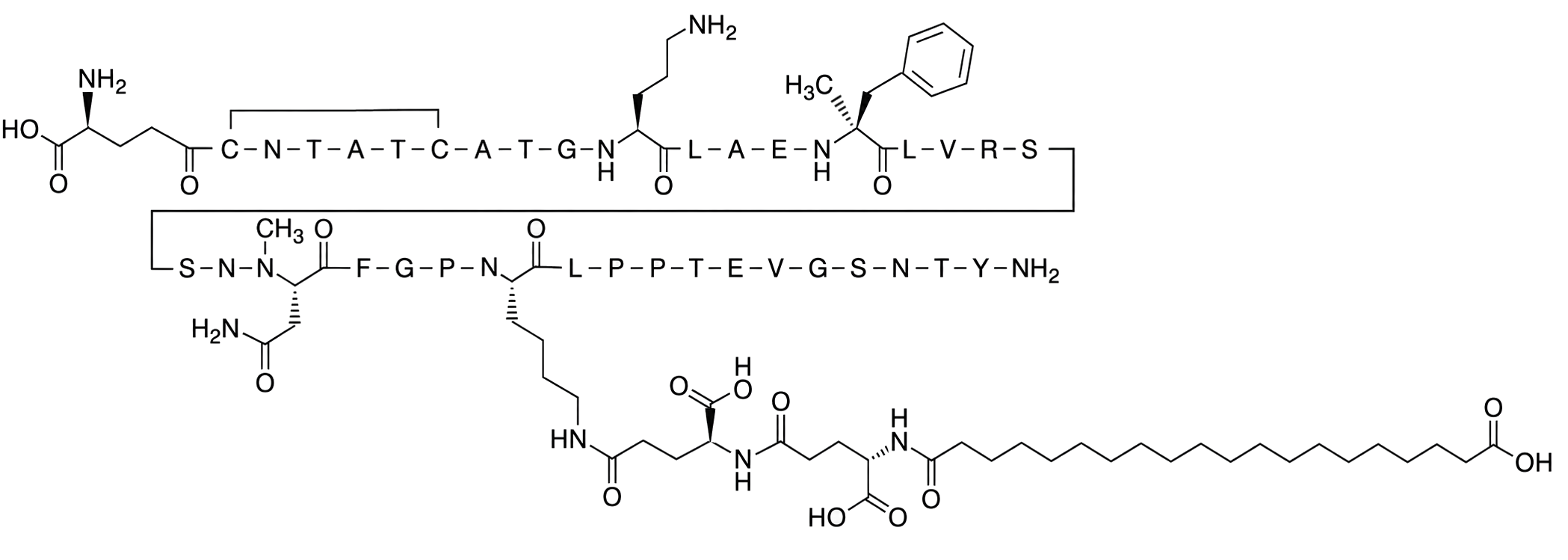

Clinical data
- Other names: LY3841136

Identifiers
- CAS Number: 2883634-40-8
- PubChem SID: 497621299
- UNII: 73G3354J8W
- KEGG: D12886

Chemical and physical data
- Formula: C_{201}H_{319}N_{49}O_{65}S_{2}
- Molar mass: 4526.16 g·mol^{−1}

Eloralintide (LY3841136) is an experimental drug that works as a selective amylin receptor agonist. It was designed to activate the amylin receptor without off-target effects at the calcitonin receptor. In a recent US randomised controlled trial of obese patients (mean bodyweight 109 kg, mean BMI 39 kg/m^{2}), those receiving the highest assessed dose showed a 20 percent reduction in body weight over the 48 week study period when compared to placebo.

== History ==
In September 2026, researchers presented results from a 48-week Phase 2b trial and a separate Phase 1b trial of eloralintide in combination with tirzepatide (EloraTZP) in obese adults with type 2 diabetes at the European Association for the Study of Diabetes Annual Meeting. Lilly intends to test EloraTZP in a Phase 3 clinical trial. Trial arm participants lost an average of nearly a quarter of their weight versus 14.8% with the highest dose of tirzepatide.
