= Pramlintide/insulin A21G =

Combination drug

Combination of
- Pramlintide: Amylin analog
- Insulin A21G: Insulin analog

Clinical data
- Other names: ADO09

Legal status
- Legal status: Investigational

Pramlintide/insulin A21G (development name ADO09) is a combination of the amylin analogue pramlintide and an insulin analog. It is being developed by Adocia for diabetes.
