= Amylin =

Peptide hormone that plays a role in glycemic regulation

IAPP

Identifiers
- Aliases: IAPP, DAP, IAP, islet amyloid polypeptide
- External IDs: OMIM: 147940; MGI: 96382; GeneCards: IAPP
Available structures
PDB	Ortholog search: PDBe RCSB
PDB	List of PDB id codes 1KUW, 2G48, 2KB8, 2L86, 3FPO, 3FR1, 3FTH, 3FTK, 3FTL, 3FTR, 3G7V, 3G7W, 3HGZ, 3DG1

Gene location (Human)
Chr.	Chromosome 12 (human)
Band	12p12.1	Start	21,354,959 bp
Band	12p12.1	End	21,379,980 bp

Gene location (Mouse)
Chr.	Chromosome 6 (mouse)
Band	6 G2|6 73.81 cM	Start	142,244,149 bp
Band	6 G2|6 73.81 cM	End	142,249,687 bp
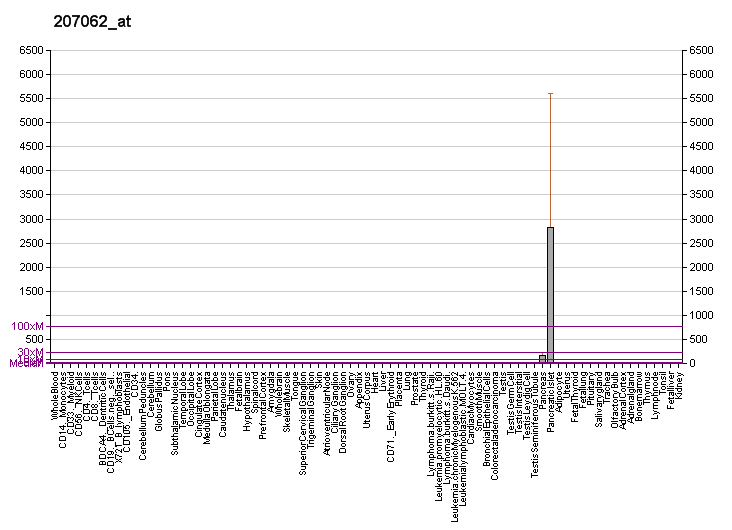
RNA expression pattern
Bgee	Human / Mouse (ortholog); Top expressed in: islet of Langerhans; beta cell; body of pancreas; right lobe of liver; left testis; right testis; duodenum; bone marrow; breast; lactiferous gland / Top expressed in: islet of Langerhans; pyloric antrum; embryo; migratory enteric neural crest cell; human fetus; Paneth cell; supraoptic nucleus; jejunum; Rostral migratory stream; crypt of lieberkuhn of small intestine; More reference expression data
BioGPS	More reference expression data
Gene ontology
Molecular function	signaling receptor binding; hormone activity; identical protein binding; amyloid-beta binding; protein binding
Cellular component	extracellular region; soma; extracellular space; inclusion body
Biological process	negative regulation of cell differentiation; cell-cell signaling; sensory perception of pain; eating behavior; signal transduction; negative regulation of bone resorption; apoptotic process; negative regulation of cell population proliferation; protein destabilization; protein homooligomerization; amyloid fibril formation; G protein-coupled receptor signaling pathway; adenylate cyclase-activating G protein-coupled receptor signaling pathway; positive regulation of cytosolic calcium ion concentration; regulation of signaling receptor activity; positive regulation of protein kinase A signaling; negative regulation of mitochondrion organization; negative regulation of protein homooligomerization; positive regulation of apoptotic process; positive regulation of MAPK cascade; positive regulation of protein kinase B signaling; amylin receptor signaling pathway; negative regulation of amyloid fibril formation
Sources:Amigo / QuickGO
Orthologs
Databases	NCBI: entry; OMA: entry
Species	Human	Mouse
Entrez	3375	15874
Ensembl	ENSG00000121351	ENSMUSG00000041681
UniProt	P10997	P12968
RefSeq (mRNA)	NM_000415; NM_001329201	NM_010491
RefSeq (protein)	NP_000406; NP_001316130	NP_034621
Location (UCSC)	Chr 12: 21.35 – 21.38 Mb	Chr 6: 142.24 – 142.25 Mb
PubMed search
- Wikidata
View/Edit Human	View/Edit Mouse

Amino acid sequence of amylin with disulfide bridge and cleavage sites of insulin degrading enzyme indicated with arrows

Amylin, or islet amyloid polypeptide (IAPP), is a 37-residue peptide hormone. It is co-secreted with insulin from the pancreatic β-cells in the ratio of approximately 100:1 (insulin:amylin). Amylin plays a role in glycemic regulation by slowing gastric emptying and promoting satiety, thereby preventing spikes in blood glucose levels after a meal.

IAPP is processed from an 89-residue coding sequence. Proislet amyloid polypeptide (proIAPP, proamylin, proislet protein) is produced in the pancreatic beta cells (β-cells) as a 67 amino acid, 7404 Dalton pro-peptide and undergoes post-translational modifications including protease cleavage to produce amylin.

== Synthesis ==
ProIAPP consists of 67 amino acids, which follow a 22 amino acid signal peptide which is rapidly cleaved after translation of the 89 amino acid coding sequence. The human sequence (from N-terminus to C-terminus) is:

(MGILKLQVFLIVLSVALNHLKA) TPIESHQVEKR^ KCNTATCATQRLANFLVHSSNNFGAILSSTNVGSNTYG^ KR^ NAVEVLKREPLNYLPL. The signal peptide is removed during translation of the protein and transport into the endoplasmic reticulum. Once inside the endoplasmic reticulum, a disulfide bond is formed between cysteine residues numbers 2 and 7. Later in the secretory pathway, the precursor undergoes additional proteolysis and posttranslational modification (indicated by ^). 11 amino acids are removed from the N-terminus by the enzyme proprotein convertase 2 (PC2) while 16 are removed from the C-terminus of the proIAPP molecule by proprotein convertase 1/3 (PC1/3). At the C-terminus Carboxypeptidase E then removes the terminal lysine and arginine residues. The terminal glycine amino acid that results from this cleavage allows the enzyme peptidylglycine alpha-amidating monooxygenase (PAM) to convert the terminal glycine to an amine group (releasing glycolate). After this step, the transformation from the precursor protein proIAPP to the biologically active IAPP (amylin) is complete (IAPP sequence: KCNTATCATQRLANFLVHSSNNFGAILSSTNVGSNTY-NH2).

== Regulation ==
Insofar as both IAPP and insulin are produced by the pancreatic β-cells, impaired β-cell function (due to lipotoxicity and glucotoxicity) will affect both insulin and IAPP production and release.

Insulin and IAPP are regulated by similar factors since they share a common regulatory promoter motif. The IAPP promoter is also activated by stimuli which do not affect insulin, such as tumor necrosis factor alpha and fatty acids. One of the defining features of Type 2 diabetes is insulin resistance. This is a condition wherein the body is unable to utilize insulin effectively, resulting in increased insulin production; since proinsulin and proIAPP are cosecreted, this results in an increase in the production of proIAPP as well. Although little is known about IAPP regulation, its connection to insulin indicates that regulatory mechanisms that affect insulin also affect IAPP. Thus blood glucose levels play an important role in regulation of proIAPP synthesis.

== Function ==
Amylin functions as part of the endocrine pancreas and contributes to glycemic control. The peptide is secreted from the pancreatic islets into the blood circulation and is cleared by peptidases in the kidney. It is not found in the urine.

Amylin's metabolic function is well-characterized as an inhibitor of the appearance of nutrient [especially glucose] in the plasma. It thus functions as a synergistic partner to insulin, with which it is cosecreted from pancreatic beta cells in response to meals. The overall effect is to slow the rate of appearance (Ra) of glucose in the blood after eating; this is accomplished via coordinate slowing down gastric emptying, inhibition of digestive secretion [gastric acid, pancreatic enzymes, and bile ejection], and a resulting reduction in food intake. Appearance of new glucose in the blood is reduced by inhibiting secretion of the gluconeogenic hormone glucagon. These actions, which are mostly carried out via a glucose-sensitive part of the brain stem, the area postrema, may be over-ridden during hypoglycemia. They collectively reduce the total insulin demand.

Amylin also acts in bone metabolism, along with the related peptides calcitonin and calcitonin gene related peptide.

Rodent amylin knockouts do not have a normal reduction of appetite following food consumption. Because it is an amidated peptide, like many neuropeptides, it is believed to be responsible for the effect on appetite.

== Structure ==
The human form of IAPP has the amino acid sequence KCNTATCATQRLANFLVHSSNNFGAILSSTNVGSNTY, with a disulfide bridge between cysteine residues 2 and 7. Both the amidated C-terminus and the disulfide bridge are necessary for the full biological activity of amylin. IAPP is capable of forming amyloid fibrils in vitro. Within the fibrillization reaction, the early prefibrillar structures are extremely toxic to beta-cell and insuloma cell cultures. Later amyloid fiber structures also seem to have some cytotoxic effect on cell cultures. Studies have shown that fibrils are the end product and not necessarily the most toxic form of amyloid proteins/peptides in general. A non-fibril forming peptide (1–19 residues of human amylin) is toxic like the full-length peptide but the respective segment of rat amylin is not. It was also demonstrated by solid-state NMR spectroscopy that the fragment 20-29 of the human-amylin fragments membranes. Rats and mice have six substitutions (three of which are proline substitutions at positions 25, 28 and 29) that are believed to prevent the formation of amyloid fibrils, although not completely as seen by its propensity to form amyloid fibrils in vitro. Rat IAPP is nontoxic to beta-cells when overexpressed in transgenic rodents.

== History ==
Before amylin deposition was associated with diabetes, already in 1901, scientists described the phenomenon of "islet hyalinization", which could be found in some cases of diabetes. A thorough study of this phenomenon was possible much later. In 1986, the isolation of an aggregate from an insulin-producing tumor was successful, a protein called IAP (Insulinoma Amyloid Peptide) was characterized, and amyloids were isolated from the pancreas of a diabetic patient, but the isolated material was not sufficient for full characterization. This was achieved only a year later by two research teams whose research was a continuation of the work from 1986.

== Clinical significance ==
ProIAPP has been linked to Type 2 diabetes and the loss of islet β-cells. Islet amyloid formation, initiated by the aggregation of proIAPP, may contribute to this progressive loss of islet β-cells. It is thought that proIAPP forms the first granules that allow for IAPP to aggregate and form amyloid which may lead to amyloid-induced apoptosis of β-cells.

IAPP is cosecreted with insulin. Insulin resistance in Type 2 diabetes produces a greater demand for insulin production which results in the secretion of proinsulin. ProIAPP is secreted simultaneously, however, the enzymes that convert these precursor molecules into insulin and IAPP, respectively, are not able to keep up with the high levels of secretion, ultimately leading to the accumulation of proIAPP.

In particular, the impaired processing of proIAPP that occurs at the N-terminal cleavage site is a key factor in the initiation of amyloid. Post-translational modification of proIAPP occurs at both the carboxy terminus and the amino terminus, however, the processing of the amino terminus occurs later in the secretory pathway. This might be one reason why it is more susceptible to impaired processing under conditions where secretion is in high demand. Thus, the conditions of Type 2 diabetes—high glucose concentrations and increased secretory demand for insulin and IAPP—could lead to the impaired N-terminal processing of proIAPP. The unprocessed proIAPP can then serve as the nucleus upon which IAPP can accumulate and form amyloid.

The amyloid formation might be a major mediator of apoptosis, or programmed cell death, in the islet β-cells. Initially, the proIAPP aggregates within secretory vesicles inside the cell. The proIAPP acts as a seed, collecting matured IAPP within the vesicles, forming intracellular amyloid. When the vesicles are released, the amyloid grows as it collects even more IAPP outside the cell. The overall effect is an apoptosis cascade initiated by the influx of ions into the β-cells.

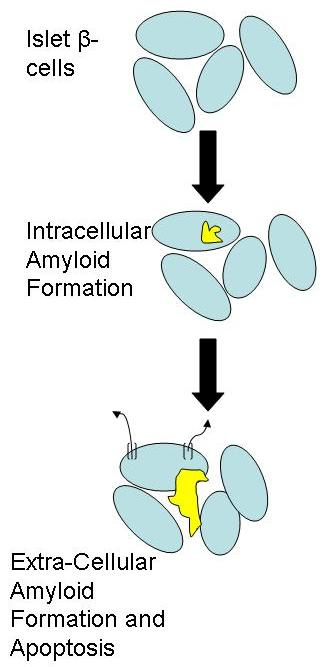
General Scheme for Amyloid Formation

In summary, impaired N-terminal processing of proIAPP is an important factor initiating amyloid formation and β-cell death. These amyloid deposits are pathological characteristics of the pancreas in Type 2 diabetes. However, it is still unclear as to whether amyloid formation is involved in or merely a consequence of type 2 diabetes. Nevertheless, it is clear that amyloid formation reduces working β-cells in patients with Type 2 diabetes. This suggests that repairing proIAPP processing may help to prevent β-cell death, thereby offering hope as a potential therapeutic approach for Type 2 diabetes.

Amyloid deposits deriving from islet amyloid polypeptide (IAPP, or amylin) are commonly found in pancreatic islets of patients suffering diabetes mellitus type 2, or containing an insulinoma cancer. While the association of amylin with the development of type 2 diabetes has been known for some time, its direct role as the cause has been harder to establish. Some studies suggest that amylin, like the related beta-amyloid (Abeta) associated with Alzheimer's disease, can induce apoptotic cell-death in insulin-producing beta cells, an effect that may be relevant to the development of type 2 diabetes.

A 2008 study reported a synergistic effect for weight loss with leptin and amylin coadministration in diet-induced obese rats by restoring hypothalamic sensitivity to leptin. However, in clinical trials, the study was halted at Phase 2 in 2011 when a problem involving antibody activity that might have neutralized the weight-loss effect of metreleptin in two patients who took the drug in a previously completed clinical study. The study combined metreleptin, a version of the human hormone leptin, and pramlintide, which is Amylin's diabetes drug Symlin, into a single obesity therapy. A proteomics study showed that human amylin shares common toxicity targets with beta-amyloid (Abeta), suggesting that type 2 diabetes and Alzheimer's disease share common toxicity mechanisms.

== Pharmacology ==
A synthetic analog of human amylin with proline substitutions in positions 25, 26 and 29, or pramlintide (brand name Symlin), was approved in 2005 for adult use in patients with both diabetes mellitus type 1 and diabetes mellitus type 2. Insulin and pramlintide, injected separately but both before a meal, work together to control the post-prandial glucose excursion.

Amylin is degraded in part by insulin-degrading enzyme. Another long- acting analogue of Amylin is Cagrilintide being developed by Novo Nordisk (now in the Phase 3 trials with the proposed brand name CagriSema co- formulated with Semaglutide as a once weekly subcutaneous injection) as a measure to treat type II DM and obesity.

== Receptors ==
There appear to be at least three distinct receptor complexes that amylin binds to with high affinity. All three complexes contain the calcitonin receptor at the core, plus one of three receptor activity-modifying proteins, RAMP1, RAMP2, or RAMP3.

== See also ==
- carboxypeptidase E
- Pancreatic islets
- peptidylglycine alpha-amidating monooxygenase (PAM)
- Pramlintide
- proprotein convertase 1/3 (PC1/3)
- proprotein convertase 2 (PC2)
- Type II Diabetes
