= Amylin Pharmaceuticals =

Biopharmaceutical company

Amylin Pharmaceuticals, Inc.
- Company type: Subsidiary
- Traded as: Nasdaq: AMLN
- Industry: Biotechnology
- Founded: 1987; 39 years ago
- Defunct: 2014
- Fate: Acquired by Bristol-Myers Squibb and AstraZeneca
- Headquarters: San Diego, California, United States
- Key people: Daniel M. Bradbury
- Products: Symlin (pramlintide); Byetta (exenatide); Bydureon (exenatide long-acting release)
- Revenue: ▼US$651 million (2011)
- Net income: ▼US$−543 million (2011)
- Total assets: ▲US$1.87 billion (2011)
- Total equity: ▼US$−139 million (2011)
- Number of employees: 1,300 (2011)
- Subsidiaries: Amylin Ohio LLC

Amylin Pharmaceuticals, Inc. was a biopharmaceutical company founded in 1987 that was based in San Diego, California. The company was engaged in the discovery, development, and commercialization of drug candidates for the treatment of diabetes, obesity, and other diseases. Amylin produced three drugs: Symlin (pramlintide acetate), Byetta (exenatide) and Bydureon (exenatide extended release).

== History ==
=== 1987–1992: Founding and IPO ===
In 1987, Amylin Pharmaceuticals was co-founded by Howard E. Greene Jr., former CEO of San Diego biotech pioneer Hybridtech, to develop a treatment for diabetes from a synthetic analog of amylin. Amylin was discovered by researchers at Oxford University earlier that year. Greene was CEO from 1987 to 1996. Amylin completed its IPO in 1992.

=== 1992–1998: Invention of Pramlintide and partnership with Johnson & Johnson ===
Amylin, in its natural form, is sticky, clumping on needles and forming little rocks in the pancreas. To create a synthetic version that was more reliable and easy to work with, researchers at Amylin Pharmaceuticals altered amino acids in the molecule. The result was a new drug named pramlintide.

In 1995, Amylin Pharmactietucals signed an agreement with Johnson & Johnson's LifeScan division to further develop pramlintide. A Phase II study made public in January 1997 showed that pramlintide was safe to mix with leading short-acting and intermediate-acting commercial insulin products, with preliminary results suggesting it might improve glycemic control.

Initial Phase III trial results released in August 1997 demonstrated statistically significant results for type 1 (juvenile-onset) diabetes, helping modestly to improve glucose control without increasing the risk of hypoglycemia (low blood sugar) while also improving weight and cholesterol levels. In patients with adult-onset type 2 diabetes, pramlintide showed significant benefits at six months but not after 12 months. In 1998, Johnson & Johnson terminated its partnership with Amylin.

=== 1998–2005: New Leadership, struggle to launch Pramlintide, and development of Byetta ===
Joseph C. Cook Jr., a 28-year veteran at Eli Lilly & Co. and an Amylin board member since 1994, came out of retirement in 1998, taking the title of chief executive officer. Cook reduced the company's workforce by 75 percent to conserve cash and raised capital from investors to keep Symlin moving through the regulatory pipeline.

==== Symlin (pramlintide) ====
In October 2001, Amylin received an approvable letter for Symlin from the FDA, requiring additional clinical data addressing concerns of severe hypoglycemia in type 1 diabetics. In December 2003, the FDA issued a second approvable letter requesting further clinical data to identify a patient population and method of use for Symlin where there is no increased risk of significant hypoglycemia or where there is an added benefit that clearly counterbalances any potential for increases in episodes of hypoglycemia. In March 2005, Symlin was approved by the FDA for use in diabetics who have difficulty maintaining glycemic control.

==== Byetta (Exenatide) ====
In October 1996, Dr. John Eng licensed to Amylin exendin-4, a peptide he had isolated in the venom of a Gila monster. Exendin-4 is similar to the human gut hormone GLP-1, which is responsible for regulating insulin and glucagon release. Unlike human GLP-1, however, exendin-4 has a half-life of several hours, making it a much better drug candidate. Amylin developed exenatide, a synthetic version of exendin-4. In 2002, Eli Lilly signed an agreement with Amylin for $325 million to partner in development of exenatide. In May 2005, Byetta (commercial name for exenatide) was approved in the United States.

=== 2011–2012: End of collaboration with Eli Lilly and acquisition ===
In July 2012, Bristol-Myers Squibb announced it would acquire Amylin Pharmaceuticals for $5.3 billion. As part of the acquisition, AstraZeneca made a $3.4 billion cash payment to make Amylin a wholly owned subsidiary within the existing BMS/AZ joint venture in diabetes. In April 2013, Bristol-Myers Squibb announced it would close Amylin's San Diego operations by the end of 2014 and merge the Amylin manufacturing facility in West Chester, Ohio, and all field-based sales personnel into Bristol-Myers Squibb operations.

In December 2013, AstraZeneca purchased the Bristol-Myers Squibb share of the diabetes joint venture, and as a result, became the sole owner of all former Amylin products and business, including the manufacturing facility in West Chester, Ohio.

On February 4, 2014, the U.S. FDA approved Myalept (metreleptin), an analog of human leptin, as replacement therapy to treat the complications of leptin deficiency, in addition to diet, in patients with congenital generalized or acquired generalized lipodystrophy. Metraleptin was originally developed at Amylin Pharmaceuticals. In November 2014, Aegerion Pharmaceuticals made a $325 million cash payment to AstraZeneca to acquire and commercialize metreleptin.
