= Monooxygenase DBH-like 1 =

Protein-coding gene in the species Homo sapiens

MOXD1

Identifiers
- Aliases: MOXD1, MOX, PRO5780, dJ248E1.1, Monooxygenase DBH-like 1, monooxygenase DBH like 1
- External IDs: OMIM: 609000; MGI: 1921582; GeneCards: MOXD1

Gene location (Human)
Chr.	Chromosome 6 (human)
Band	6q23.2	Start	132,296,055 bp
Band	6q23.2	End	132,401,475 bp

Gene location (Mouse)
Chr.	Chromosome 10 (mouse)
Band	10|10 A4	Start	24,099,415 bp
Band	10|10 A4	End	24,178,688 bp
RNA expression pattern
Bgee	Human / Mouse (ortholog); Top expressed in: ventricular zone; ganglionic eminence; cartilage tissue; periodontal fiber; gallbladder; body of uterus; stromal cell of endometrium; gastric mucosa; myometrium; left adrenal gland / Top expressed in: vas deferens; lumbar spinal ganglion; Epithelium of choroid plexus; lip; hair follicle; skin of external ear; molar; sciatic nerve; external carotid artery; efferent ductule; More reference expression data
BioGPS	n/a
Gene ontology
Molecular function	monooxygenase activity; oxidoreductase activity; protein binding; catalytic activity; metal ion binding; copper ion binding; dopamine beta-monooxygenase activity; oxidoreductase activity, acting on paired donors, with incorporation or reduction of molecular oxygen, reduced ascorbate as one donor, and incorporation of one atom of oxygen
Cellular component	integral component of membrane; endoplasmic reticulum membrane; endoplasmic reticulum; membrane; extracellular space; secretory granule membrane; cytoplasm
Biological process	octopamine biosynthetic process; dopamine catabolic process; norepinephrine biosynthetic process
Sources:Amigo / QuickGO
Orthologs
Databases	NCBI: entry; OMA: entry
Species	Human	Mouse
Entrez	26002	59012
Ensembl	ENSG00000079931	ENSMUSG00000020000
UniProt	Q6UVY6	Q9CXI3
RefSeq (mRNA)	NM_015529	NM_021509
RefSeq (protein)	NP_056344	NP_067484
Location (UCSC)	Chr 6: 132.3 – 132.4 Mb	Chr 10: 24.1 – 24.18 Mb
PubMed search
- Wikidata
View/Edit Human	View/Edit Mouse

DBH-like monooxygenase protein 1, also known as monooxygenase X, is an enzyme that in humans is encoded by the MOXD1 gene.

DBH-like 1 maintains many of the structural features of dopamine beta-monooxygenase DBH. Since Peptidylglycine alpha-hydroxylating monooxygenase (PHM; EC 1.14.17.3) is homologous to dopamine beta-monooxygenase (DBM; EC 1.14.17.1) this concerns a structural basis for a new family of copper type II, significantly specific for ascorbate-dependent monooxygenases based on the corresponding mouse homolog. The pathway of catecholamine synthesis is a possible catecholamine-binding metabolic copper enzyme domain, a neuron-like property encoding MOX without a signal sequence enzyme metabolism resolving the monooxygenase X chemical pathway of an unknown substrate, exogenous MOX is not secreted, and it localizes throughout the endoplasmic reticulum, in both endocrine or nonendocrine cells.

== Deficiency ==
DBH deficiency has been treated effectively with L-threo-3,4-dihydroxyphenylserine (DOPS).

== See also ==
- Dopamine-beta-hydroxylase-DBH,
- Dopamine beta-monooxygenase-DBM,
- Peptidylglycine alpha-hydroxylating monooxygenase-PHM
- peptidyl-alpha-hydroxyglycine alpha-amidating lyase-PAL
- Tyrosine 3-monooxygenase-TH.
