= RAMP3 =

Protein-coding gene in the species Homo sapiens

Identifiers
- Aliases: RAMP3, entrez:10268, receptor activity modifying protein 3
- External IDs: OMIM: 605155; MGI: 1860292; GeneCards: RAMP3

Gene location (Human)
Chr.	Chromosome 7 (human)
Band	7p13	Start	45,157,791 bp
Band	7p13	End	45,186,302 bp

Gene location (Mouse)
Chr.	Chromosome 11 (mouse)
Band	11 A1|11 4.61 cM	Start	6,608,521 bp
Band	11 A1|11 4.61 cM	End	6,627,475 bp
RNA expression pattern
Bgee	Human / Mouse (ortholog); Top expressed in: right lung; upper lobe of left lung; C1 segment; apex of heart; right lobe of thyroid gland; left lobe of thyroid gland; gastric mucosa; left ventricle; subcutaneous adipose tissue; right auricle of heart / Top expressed in: medial dorsal nucleus; gastrula; lateral geniculate nucleus; medial geniculate nucleus; cervix; decidua; right kidney; neural layer of retina; dentate gyrus of hippocampal formation granule cell; barrel cortex; More reference expression data
BioGPS	n/a
Gene ontology
Molecular function	coreceptor activity; protein binding; amyloid-beta binding; adrenomedullin receptor activity; amylin receptor activity
Cellular component	integral component of membrane; membrane; plasma membrane; receptor complex; integral component of plasma membrane; intracellular anatomical structure; cell surface; lysosome; amylin receptor complex 3; adrenomedullin receptor complex
Biological process	G protein-coupled receptor signaling pathway; regulation of G protein-coupled receptor signaling pathway; cellular response to estradiol stimulus; receptor internalization; G protein-coupled receptor signaling pathway involved in heart process; transport; protein transport; protein localization to plasma membrane; intracellular protein transport; negative regulation of transcription, DNA-templated; calcium ion transport; positive regulation of receptor recycling; angiogenesis; adenylate cyclase-activating G protein-coupled receptor signaling pathway; positive regulation of gene expression; positive regulation of protein kinase A signaling; positive regulation of cell death; cellular response to hormone stimulus; positive regulation of peptidyl-serine phosphorylation; cross-receptor inhibition within G protein-coupled receptor heterodimer; positive regulation of protein kinase B signaling; positive regulation of ERK1 and ERK2 cascade; amylin receptor signaling pathway; positive regulation of protein localization to plasma membrane; response to amyloid-beta; positive regulation of calcium ion import across plasma membrane; adrenomedullin receptor signaling pathway
Sources:Amigo / QuickGO
Orthologs
Databases	NCBI: entry; OMA: entry
Species	Human	Mouse
Entrez	10268	56089
Ensembl	ENSG00000122679	ENSMUSG00000041046
UniProt	O60896	Q9WUP1
RefSeq (mRNA)	NM_005856	NM_019511
RefSeq (protein)	NP_005847	NP_062384
Location (UCSC)	Chr 7: 45.16 – 45.19 Mb	Chr 11: 6.61 – 6.63 Mb
PubMed search
- Wikidata
View/Edit Human	View/Edit Mouse

Receptor activity modifying protein 3, also known as RAMP3, is a human gene.

The protein encoded by this gene is a member of the RAMP family of single-transmembrane-domain proteins, called receptor (calcitonin) activity modifying proteins (RAMPs). RAMPs are type I transmembrane proteins with an extracellular N terminus and a cytoplasmic C terminus. RAMPs are required to transport calcitonin-receptor-like receptor (CRLR) to the plasma membrane. CRLR, a receptor with seven transmembrane domains, can function as either a calcitonin gene-related peptide (CGRP) receptor or an adrenomedullin receptor, depending on which members of the RAMP family are expressed. In humans and other mammals, there are 3 RAMPS, while in fish there are more, with sub-variants. In the presence of this (RAMP3) protein, CRLR functions as an adrenomedullin receptor with low affinity for CGRP.
