= RAMP1 =

Protein-coding gene in the species Homo sapiens

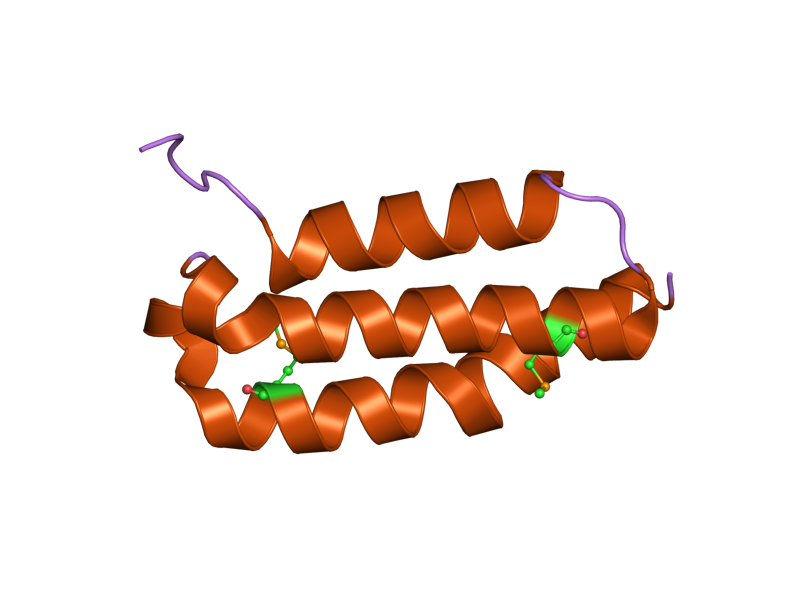

Identifiers
- Aliases: RAMP1, entrez:10267, receptor activity modifying protein 1
- External IDs: OMIM: 605153; MGI: 1858418; GeneCards: RAMP1
Available structures
PDB	Ortholog search: PDBe RCSB
PDB	List of PDB id codes 2YX8, 3N7P, 3N7R, 3N7S, 4RWG

Gene location (Human)
Chr.	Chromosome 2 (human)
Band	2q37.3	Start	237,858,893 bp
Band	2q37.3	End	237,912,106 bp

Gene location (Mouse)
Chr.	Chromosome 1 (mouse)
Band	1 D|1 46.08 cM	Start	91,107,544 bp
Band	1 D|1 46.08 cM	End	91,152,918 bp
RNA expression pattern
Bgee	Human / Mouse (ortholog); Top expressed in: body of uterus; ascending aorta; canal of the cervix; Descending thoracic aorta; right coronary artery; left uterine tube; apex of heart; popliteal artery; tibial arteries; gastric mucosa / Top expressed in: temporal muscle; soleus muscle; sternocleidomastoid muscle; crypt of lieberkuhn of small intestine; entorhinal cortex; perirhinal cortex; olfactory tubercle; seminal vesicula; nucleus accumbens; masseter muscle; More reference expression data
BioGPS	n/a
Gene ontology
Molecular function	coreceptor activity; calcitonin receptor activity; calcitonin receptor binding; protein binding; calcitonin gene-related peptide receptor activity; amylin receptor activity; calcitonin gene-related peptide binding
Cellular component	integral component of membrane; membrane; plasma membrane; receptor complex; integral component of plasma membrane; intracellular anatomical structure; cell surface; extracellular space; amylin receptor complex 1; CGRP receptor complex
Biological process	G protein-coupled receptor signaling pathway; positive regulation of protein glycosylation; regulation of G protein-coupled receptor signaling pathway; receptor internalization; angiogenesis; transport; protein transport; protein localization to plasma membrane; intracellular protein transport; calcium ion transport; adenylate cyclase-activating G protein-coupled receptor signaling pathway; cellular response to hormone stimulus; amylin receptor signaling pathway; calcitonin gene-related peptide receptor signaling pathway
Sources:Amigo / QuickGO
Orthologs
Databases	NCBI: entry; OMA: entry
Species	Human	Mouse
Entrez	10267	51801
Ensembl	ENSG00000132329	ENSMUSG00000034353
UniProt	O60894	Q9WTJ5
RefSeq (mRNA)	NM_001308353; NM_005855	NM_001168392; NM_016894; NM_178401
RefSeq (protein)	NP_001295282; NP_005846	NP_001161864; NP_058590; NP_848488
Location (UCSC)	Chr 2: 237.86 – 237.91 Mb	Chr 1: 91.11 – 91.15 Mb
PubMed search
- Wikidata
View/Edit Human	View/Edit Mouse

Receptor activity modifying protein 1 is a protein that in humans is encoded by the RAMP1 gene.

The protein encoded by this gene is a member of the RAMP family of single-transmembrane-domain proteins, called receptor (calcitonin) activity modifying proteins (RAMPs). RAMPs are type I transmembrane proteins with an extracellular N terminus and a cytoplasmic C terminus. RAMPs are required to transport calcitonin-receptor-like receptor (CALCRL) to the plasma membrane. CALCRL, a receptor with seven transmembrane domains, can function as either a calcitonin gene-related peptide (CGRP) receptor or an adrenomedullin receptor, depending on which members of the RAMP family are expressed. In combination with the RAMP1 protein, CALCRL functions as the CGRP receptor. The RAMP1 protein is involved in the terminal glycosylation, maturation, and presentation of the CGRP receptor to the cell surface. The RAMP1 protein can also interact with the calcitonin receptor (CT) protein, where heteromerisation of RAMP1 with CT converts CT from a calcitonin receptor to the amylin receptor AMY_{1}

== See also ==
- Receptor activity-modifying protein
