= RAMP2 =

Protein-coding gene in the species Homo sapiens

Identifiers
- Aliases: RAMP2, entrez:10266, receptor activity modifying protein 2
- External IDs: OMIM: 605154; MGI: 1859650; GeneCards: RAMP2
Available structures
PDB	Ortholog search: PDBe RCSB
PDB	List of PDB id codes 4RWF, 2XVT, 3AQE, 3AQF

Gene location (Human)
Chr.	Chromosome 17 (human)
Band	17q21.2	Start	42,758,447 bp
Band	17q21.2	End	42,763,041 bp

Gene location (Mouse)
Chr.	Chromosome 11 (mouse)
Band	11 D|11 64.47 cM	Start	101,136,854 bp
Band	11 D|11 64.47 cM	End	101,150,372 bp
RNA expression pattern
Bgee	Human / Mouse (ortholog); Top expressed in: right lung; gastric mucosa; apex of heart; upper lobe of left lung; tibial nerve; canal of the cervix; subcutaneous adipose tissue; right coronary artery; left uterine tube; right lobe of thyroid gland / Top expressed in: right lung; right lung lobe; left lung; left lung lobe; external carotid artery; atrium; internal carotid artery; carotid body; endocardial cushion; yolk sac; More reference expression data
BioGPS	n/a
Gene ontology
Molecular function	coreceptor activity; protein binding; adrenomedullin receptor activity; amylin receptor activity; adrenomedullin binding
Cellular component	cytoplasm; integral component of membrane; membrane; plasma membrane; receptor complex; integral component of plasma membrane; cell surface; clathrin-coated pit; lysosome; amylin receptor complex 2; adrenomedullin receptor complex
Biological process	negative regulation of endothelial cell apoptotic process; G protein-coupled receptor signaling pathway; response to estradiol; response to hypoxia; regulation of G protein-coupled receptor signaling pathway; adherens junction assembly; response to progesterone; female pregnancy; receptor internalization; sprouting angiogenesis; basement membrane assembly; positive regulation of angiogenesis; vasculogenesis; regulation of blood pressure; development of the heart; cellular response to hormone stimulus; positive regulation of gene expression; positive regulation of vasculogenesis; angiogenesis; bicellular tight junction assembly; transport; protein transport; cellular response to vascular endothelial growth factor stimulus; intracellular protein transport; protein localization to plasma membrane; vascular associated smooth muscle cell development; calcium ion transport; negative regulation of vascular permeability; cAMP biosynthetic process; adenylate cyclase-activating G protein-coupled receptor signaling pathway; amylin receptor signaling pathway; adrenomedullin receptor signaling pathway
Sources:Amigo / QuickGO
Orthologs
Databases	NCBI: entry; OMA: entry
Species	Human	Mouse
Entrez	10266	54409
Ensembl	ENSG00000131477	ENSMUSG00000001240
UniProt	O60895	Q9WUP0
RefSeq (mRNA)	NM_005854	NM_019444
RefSeq (protein)	NP_005845	NP_062317
Location (UCSC)	Chr 17: 42.76 – 42.76 Mb	Chr 11: 101.14 – 101.15 Mb
PubMed search
- Wikidata
View/Edit Human	View/Edit Mouse

Receptor activity modifying protein 2, also known as RAMP2, is a protein which in humans is encoded by the RAMP2 gene.

== Function ==
The protein encoded by this gene is a member of the RAMP family of single-transmembrane-domain proteins, called receptor (calcitonin) activity modifying proteins (RAMPs). RAMPs are type I transmembrane proteins with an extracellular N-terminus and a cytoplasmic C-terminus. RAMPs are required to transport calcitonin-receptor-like receptor (CRLR) to the plasma membrane. CRLR, a receptor with seven transmembrane domains, can function as either a calcitonin gene-related peptide (CGRP) receptor or an adrenomedullin receptor, depending on which members of the RAMP family are expressed. In the presence of this (RAMP2) protein, CRLR functions as an adrenomedullin receptor. The RAMP2 protein is involved in core glycosylation and transportation of adrenomedullin receptor to the cell surface.
