= Receptor activity-modifying protein =

Protein family

Identifiers
- Symbol: RAMP
- Pfam: PF04901
- InterPro: IPR006985
- Membranome: 10
Available protein structures:
- PDB: IPR006985 PF04901 (ECOD; PDBsum)
- AlphaFold: IPR006985; PF04901

Receptor activity-modifying protein 1

Identifiers
- Symbol: RAMP1
- NCBI gene: 10267
- HGNC: 9843
- OMIM: 605153
- RefSeq: NM_005855
- UniProt: O60894

Other data
- Locus: Chr. 2 q36-37.1
Search for
- Structures: Swiss-model
- Domains: InterPro

Receptor activity-modifying protein 2

Identifiers
- Symbol: RAMP2
- NCBI gene: 10266
- HGNC: 9844
- OMIM: 605154
- RefSeq: NM_005854
- UniProt: O60895

Other data
- Locus: Chr. 17 q12-21.1
Search for
- Structures: Swiss-model
- Domains: InterPro

Receptor activity-modifying protein 3

Identifiers
- Symbol: RAMP3
- NCBI gene: 10268
- HGNC: 9845
- OMIM: 605155
- RefSeq: NM_005856
- UniProt: O60896

Other data
- Locus: Chr. 7 q13-p12
Search for
- Structures: Swiss-model
- Domains: InterPro

Receptor activity-modifying proteins (RAMPs) are a class of protein that interact with and modulate the activities of several Class B G protein-coupled receptors including the receptors for secretin, calcitonin (CT), glucagon, and vasoactive intestinal peptide (VIP). There are three distinct types of RAMPs in mammals (though more in fish), designated RAMP1, RAMP2, and RAMP3, each encoded by a separate gene.

== Function ==
Currently, the function of RAMPs is divided into classes of activities. When associated with the Calcitonin receptor (CTR) or Calcitonin receptor-like (CALCRL) (below), RAMPs can change the selectivity of the receptor for a specific hormone. In the cases of the other receptors mentioned, however, there is no evidence that they can do this, but instead function to regulate trafficking of receptors from the ER / golgi to the membrane. These functions appear to be ones where there is redundancy, as neither RAMP1 nor RAMP3 knockout mice (KO) have grossly abnormal phenotypes. The likelihood is that the phenotype of RAMP2 KO mice is more connected with the abolition of most adrenomedullin (AM) signalling than effects on trafficking of other receptors, as those mice are almost identical to AM KO mice and mice lacking the Calcitonin-like receptor which are unable to form either AM1 or AM-2 adrenomedullin receptors (CLR/RAMP2 and CLR/RAMP3 respectively).

== Types ==
Association of RAMPs with either the CT or CALCRL proteins forms 6 different receptors from the calcitonin receptor family:

| GPCR | RAMP isoform | resultant receptor |
|---|---|---|
| Calcitonin receptor-like | RAMP1 | CGRP receptor |
| Calcitonin receptor-like | RAMP2 | adrenomedullin (AM) receptor, designated AM_{1} |
| Calcitonin receptor-like | RAMP3 | dual CGRP/AM receptor, designated AM_{2} |
| Calcitonin receptor | RAMP1 | amylin receptor AMY_{1} |
| Calcitonin receptor | RAMP2 | amylin receptor AMY_{2} |
| Calcitonin receptor | RAMP3 | amylin receptor AMY_{3} |
