= Peptidylglycine alpha-amidating monooxygenase =

Protein-coding gene in the species Homo sapiens

PAM
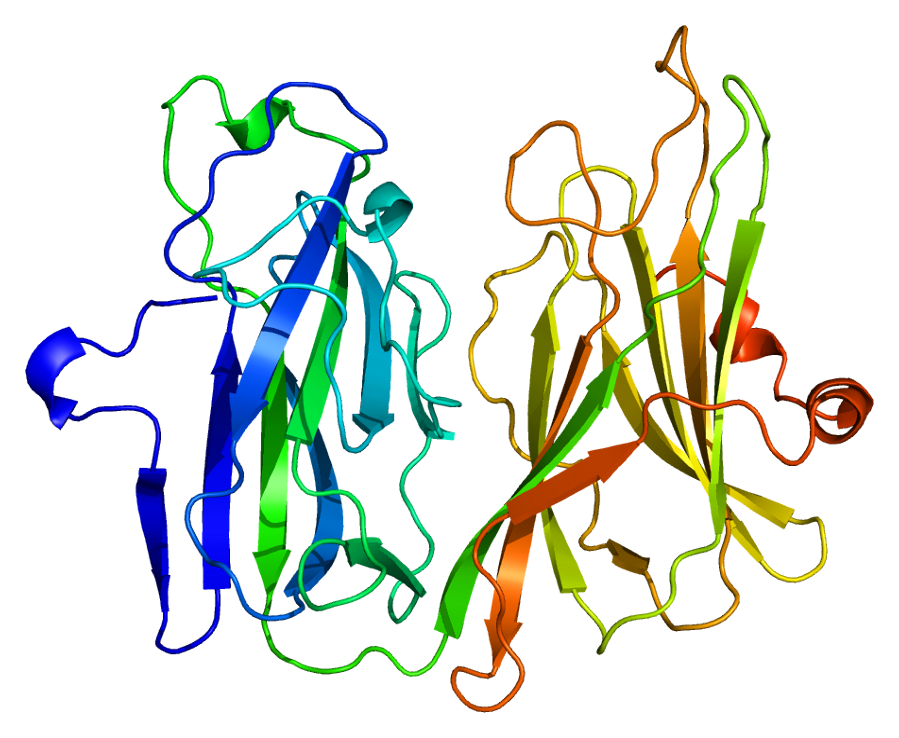

Identifiers
- Aliases: PAM, PAL, PHM, Peptidylglycine alpha-amidating monooxygenase
- External IDs: OMIM: 170270; MGI: 97475; GeneCards: PAM
Enzyme activity
EC #	BRENDA	ExPASy	KEGG	MetaCyc
1.14.17.3	↗	↗	↗	↗
4.3.2.5	↗	↗	↗	↗

Gene location (Human)
Chr.	Chromosome 5 (human)
Band	5q21.1	Start	102,753,981 bp
Band	5q21.1	End	103,031,105 bp

Gene location (Mouse)
Chr.	Chromosome 1 (mouse)
Band	1 D|1 47.76 cM	Start	97,795,114 bp
Band	1 D|1 47.76 cM	End	98,095,646 bp
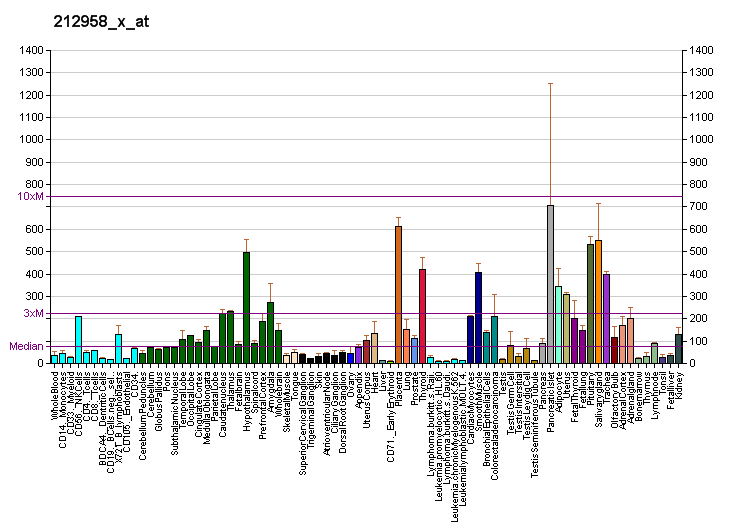

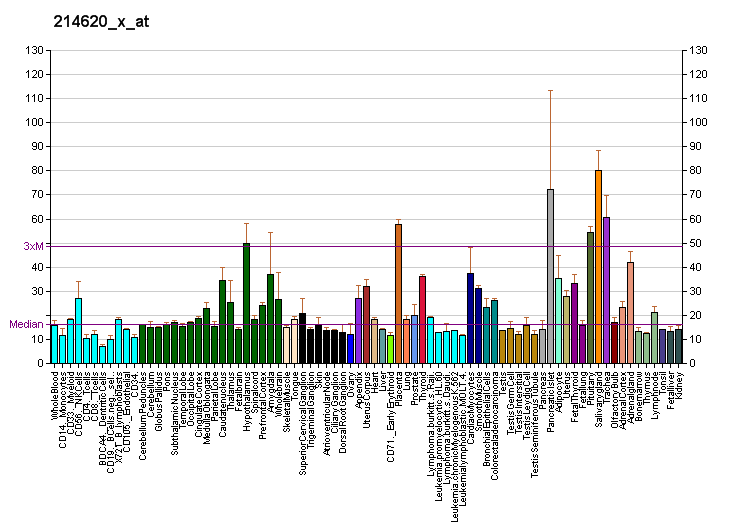

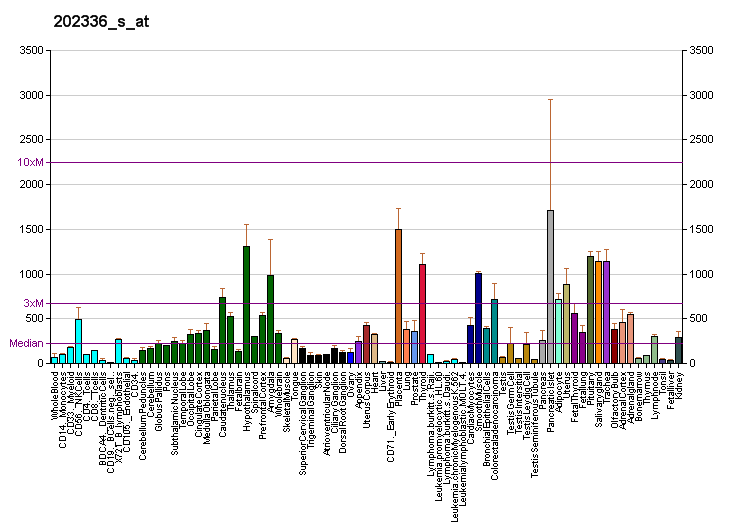
RNA expression pattern
Bgee	Human / Mouse (ortholog); Top expressed in: cardiac muscle tissue of right atrium; right ventricle; right auricle of heart; corpus epididymis; parotid gland; beta cell; vena cava; Descending thoracic aorta; glomerulus; metanephric glomerulus / Top expressed in: aortic valve; ascending aorta; decidua; dentate gyrus of hippocampal formation granule cell; gastrula; superior frontal gyrus; primary visual cortex; atrioventricular valve; lip; neural layer of retina; More reference expression data
BioGPS	More reference expression data
Gene ontology
Molecular function	metal ion binding; calcium ion binding; copper ion binding; lyase activity; protein kinase binding; monooxygenase activity; catalytic activity; oxidoreductase activity; oxidoreductase activity, acting on paired donors, with incorporation or reduction of molecular oxygen, reduced ascorbate as one donor, and incorporation of one atom of oxygen; L-ascorbic acid binding; protein binding; zinc ion binding; peptidylglycine monooxygenase activity; peptidylamidoglycolate lyase activity
Cellular component	extracellular exosome; extracellular region; integral component of membrane; trans-Golgi network; neuron projection; cell surface; soma; perinuclear region of cytoplasm; plasma membrane; secretory granule membrane; secretory granule; perikaryon; membrane; extracellular space; transport vesicle membrane; cytoplasmic vesicle
Biological process	response to hypoxia; limb development; ovulation cycle process; odontogenesis; regulation of protein secretion; response to estradiol; regulation of actin cytoskeleton organization; maternal process involved in female pregnancy; regulation of transcription by RNA polymerase II; metabolism; protein homooligomerization; response to copper ion; development of the heart; central nervous system development; toxin metabolic process; response to pH; response to glucocorticoid; protein amidation; protein metabolic process; long-chain fatty acid metabolic process; peptide metabolic process; lactation; peptide amidation; fatty acid primary amide biosynthetic process
Sources:Amigo / QuickGO
Orthologs
Databases	NCBI: entry; OMA: entry
Species	Human	Mouse
Entrez	5066	18484
Ensembl	ENSG00000145730	ENSMUSG00000026335
UniProt	P19021	P97467
RefSeq (mRNA)	NM_000919; NM_001177306; NM_138766; NM_138821; NM_138822 NM_001319943	NM_013626; NM_001357127
RefSeq (protein)	NP_000910; NP_001170777; NP_001306872; NP_620121; NP_620176 NP_620177; NP_001351511; NP_001351512; NP_001351513; NP_001351514; NP_001351515; NP_001351516; NP_001351517; NP_001351518; NP_001351519; NP_001351520; NP_001351521; NP_001351522; NP_001351523	NP_038654; NP_001344056
Location (UCSC)	Chr 5: 102.75 – 103.03 Mb	Chr 1: 97.8 – 98.1 Mb
PubMed search
- Wikidata
View/Edit Human	View/Edit Mouse

Peptidyl-glycine alpha-amidating monooxygenase, or PAM, is an enzyme that catalyzes the conversion of an n+1 residue long peptide with a C-terminal glycine into an n-residue peptide with a terminal amide group. In the process, one molecule of O_{2} is consumed and the glycine residue is removed from the peptide and converted to glyoxylic acid.

The enzyme is involved in the biosynthesis of many signaling peptides and some fatty acid amides.

In humans, the enzyme is encoded by the PAM gene. This transformation is achieved by conversion of a prohormone to the corresponding amide (C(=O)NH_{2}). This enzyme is the only known pathway for generating peptide amides. Replacing the carboxylic acid group with an amide group makes the peptide more hydrophobic and more likely to be neutrally charged at physiologic pH, and it is believed that these neutrally charged peptide amides can more easily bind to receptors.

== Function ==
This gene encodes a multifunctional protein. It has two enzymatically active domains with catalytic activities - peptidylglycine alpha-hydroxylating monooxygenase (PHM) and peptidyl-alpha-hydroxyglycine alpha-amidating lyase (PAL). These catalytic domains work sequentially to catalyze neuroendocrine peptides to active alpha-amidated products. The reaction pathway catalyzed by PAM is accessed via quantum tunneling and substrate preorganization. Multiple alternatively spliced transcript variants encoding different isoforms have been described for this gene, but some of their full-length sequences are not yet known.

The PHM subunit effects hydroxylation of a C-terminal glycine residue:

peptide-C(O)NHCH_{2}CO_{2}^{−} + O_{2} + 2 [H] → peptide-C(O)NHCH(OH)CO_{2}^{−} + H_{2}O

This process shown above is the hydroxylation of a methylene group (-CH_{2}-) by O_{2}, and this process relies on a copper ion cofactor. Dopamine beta-hydroxylase, also a copper-containing enzyme, effects a similar transformation.

The PAL subunit then completes the conversion, by catalyzing elimination from the hydroxylated glycine:

peptide-C(O)NHCH(OH)CO_{2}^{−} → peptide-C(O)NH_{2} + CH(O)CO_{2}^{−}

The eliminated coproduct is glyoxylate, written above as CH(O)CO_{2}^{−}.

=== In insects ===
Insect PαAMs are responsive to O_{2} concentrations and depends upon Cu^{2+}. Simpson et al 2015 finds insect PαAMs to respond to hypoxia by regulating the activity of several peptide hormones. They find PαAM to probably be an important part of neuroendocrine responses to hypoxia.
