= CALCRL =

Mammalian protein found in humans

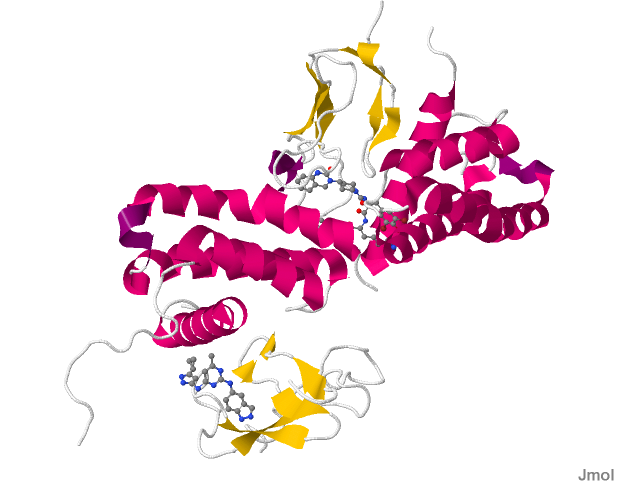

Identifiers
- Aliases: CALCRL, CGRPR, CRLR, calcitonin receptor like receptor, LMPHM8
- External IDs: OMIM: 114190; MGI: 1926944; GeneCards: CALCRL
Available structures
PDB	Ortholog search: PDBe RCSB
PDB	List of PDB id codes 3AQF, 3N7P, 3N7R, 3N7S, 4RWF

Gene location (Human)
Chr.	Chromosome 2 (human)
Band	2q32.1	Start	187,341,964 bp
Band	2q32.1	End	187,448,460 bp

Gene location (Mouse)
Chr.	Chromosome 2 (mouse)
Band	2|2 D	Start	84,160,970 bp
Band	2|2 D	End	84,255,755 bp
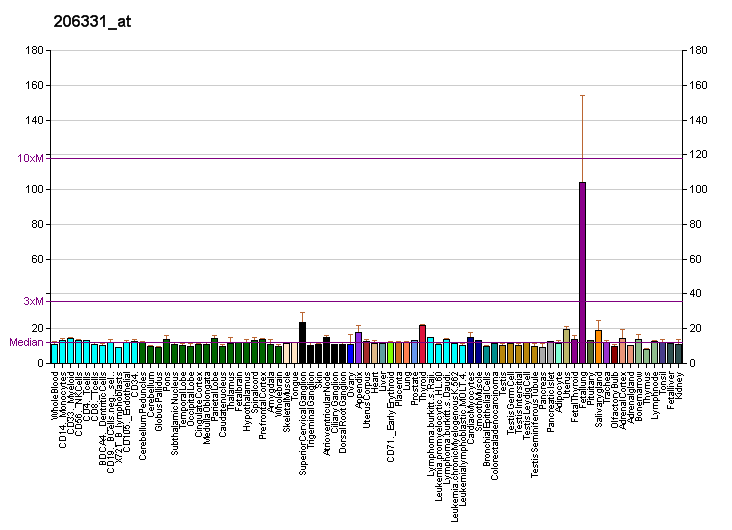

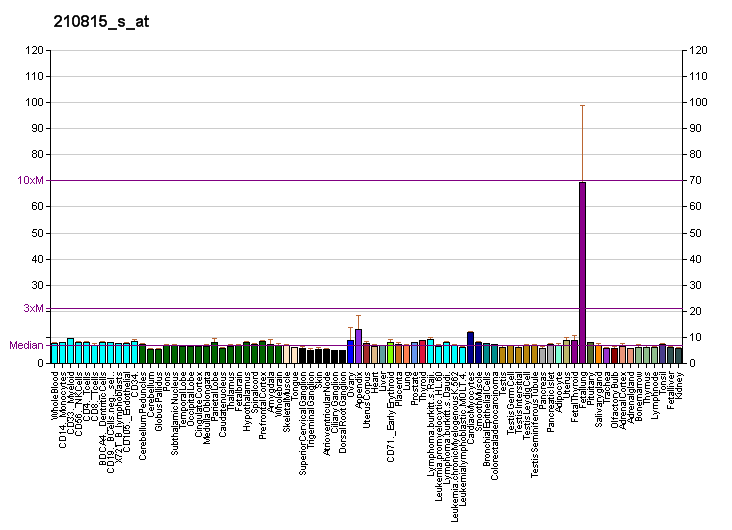
RNA expression pattern
Bgee	Human / Mouse (ortholog); Top expressed in: right lung; upper lobe of left lung; Achilles tendon; gallbladder; lower lobe of lung; right coronary artery; left coronary artery; smooth muscle tissue; subcutaneous adipose tissue; popliteal artery / Top expressed in: left lung lobe; right lung; right lung lobe; vas deferens; iris; atrioventricular valve; carotid body; genital tubercle; endothelial cell of lymphatic vessel; semi-lunar valve; More reference expression data
BioGPS	More reference expression data
Gene ontology
Molecular function	G protein-coupled receptor activity; calcitonin receptor activity; signal transducer activity; protein binding; transmembrane signaling receptor activity; adrenomedullin receptor activity; calcitonin gene-related peptide receptor activity; adrenomedullin binding
Cellular component	integral component of membrane; endosome; membrane; plasma membrane; integral component of plasma membrane; endoplasmic reticulum; lysosome; cytoplasm; adrenomedullin receptor complex; CGRP receptor complex
Biological process	negative regulation of smooth muscle contraction; G protein-coupled receptor signaling pathway, coupled to cyclic nucleotide second messenger; receptor internalization; cellular response to sucrose stimulus; development of the heart; cell surface receptor signaling pathway; angiogenesis; positive regulation of cell population proliferation; protein transport; negative regulation of inflammatory response; calcium ion transport; signal transduction; positive regulation of smooth muscle cell proliferation; G protein-coupled receptor signaling pathway; adenylate cyclase-activating G protein-coupled receptor signaling pathway; calcitonin gene-related peptide receptor signaling pathway; adrenomedullin receptor signaling pathway
Sources:Amigo / QuickGO
Orthologs
Databases	NCBI: entry; OMA: entry
Species	Human	Mouse
Entrez	10203	54598
Ensembl	ENSG00000064989	ENSMUSG00000059588
UniProt	Q16602	Q9R1W5
RefSeq (mRNA)	NM_001271751; NM_005795; NM_001369434; NM_001369435	NM_018782
RefSeq (protein)	NP_001258680; NP_005786; NP_001356363; NP_001356364	NP_061252
Location (UCSC)	Chr 2: 187.34 – 187.45 Mb	Chr 2: 84.16 – 84.26 Mb
PubMed search
- Wikidata
View/Edit Human	View/Edit Mouse

Calcitonin receptor-like (CALCRL), also known as the calcitonin receptor-like receptor (CRLR), is a protein that in humans is encoded by the CALCRL gene. This protein is a component of 3 distinct receptors that are activated by hormones like calcitonin gene-related peptide and adrenomedullin.

== Tissue distribution ==
RNA expression charts show highest expression in lung and adipose tissue in humans. Cell types that express the highest levels of CALCRL include oligodendrocyte precursor cells, endothelial cells, lymphatic endothelial cells, adipocytes, endometrial stromal cells, as well as dendritic cells.

== Structure ==
The calcitonin receptor-like (CALCRL) protein is a class B G protein-coupled receptor (GPCR) characterized by seven transmembrane helices and a relatively large N-terminal extracellular domain (ECD) comprising 100–160 residues and three conserved disulfide bonds. CALCRL forms functional heterodimeric complexes with one of three single transmembrane receptor activity-modifying proteins (RAMPs), namely RAMP1, RAMP2, or RAMP3, which determine its ligand specificity. The extracellular domain of CALCRL consists of one α-helix, two antiparallel β-strands, five loop regions, and is stabilized by intramolecular disulfide bonds, which are crucial for ligand binding and specificity. The CALCRL/RAMP complex presents a unique ligand-binding pocket, enabling selective recognition of peptide agonists on the extracellular surface, which then triggers conformational changes in transmembrane helices to facilitate intracellular G-protein coupling and signal transduction.

== Function ==
The protein encoded by the CALCRL gene is a G protein-coupled receptor related to the calcitonin receptor. CALCRL is linked to one of three single transmembrane domain receptor activity-modifying proteins (RAMPs) that are essential for functional activity.

The association of CALCRL with different RAMP proteins produces different receptors:

- with RAMP1: produces a CGRP receptor
- with RAMP2: produces an adrenomedullin (AM) receptor, designated AM_{1}
- with RAMP3: produces a dual CGRP/AM receptor designated AM_{2}

These receptors are linked to the G protein G_{s}, which activates adenylate cyclase and activation results in the generation of intracellular cyclic adenosine monophosphate (cAMP).

CGRP receptors are found throughout the body, suggesting that the protein may modulate a variety of physiological functions in all major systems (e.g., respiratory, endocrine, gastrointestinal, immune, and cardiovascular).

The CGRP family of receptors including CALCRL can couple to G-protein Gαs, Gαi and Gαq subunits to transduce their signals. Furthermore binding of ligands to CALCRL can bias coupling to these G-protein. Peptide agonist bind to the extracellular loops of CALCRL. This binding in turn causes TM5 (transmembrane helix 5) and TM6 to pivot around TM3 which in turn facilitates Gαs binding.

=== Adrenomedullin receptor ===
CALCRL binds Ramp2 to form the adrenomedullin receptor 1 (AM_{1}), while it binds Ramp3 to form adrenomedullin receptor 2 (AM_{2}). Adrenomedullin is a multifunctional 52 amino acid peptide widely expressed throughout the body. Its most prominent functions include regulation of blood pressure, endothelial barrier development and stability, and inflammation. Administration of adrenomedullin causes vasodilation and decreased blood pressure via binding to its receptors.

== Clinical significance ==
Calcitonin gene-related peptide receptor antagonists are FDA approved for the treatment of migraine. This includes Erenumab, Ubrogepant and Zavegepant.

=== Wounds ===
In wounds, CGRP receptors found in nerve cells deactivate the immune system, to prevent collateral damage in case of a clean wound (common case). In very preliminary research, nerve blockers like lidocaine or botox have been demonstrated to block CGRP cascade, thereby allowing immune system involvement and control of pathogens, resulting in complete control and recovery.
