= Pramlintide =

Diabetes medication

- Golden line indicates disulfide bond

Clinical data
- Trade names: Symlin
- AHFS/Drugs.com: Monograph
- MedlinePlus: a605031
- Routes of administration: Subcutaneous
- ATC code: A10BX05 (WHO)

Legal status
- Legal status: US: ℞-only

Pharmacokinetic data
- Bioavailability: 30 to 40%
- Protein binding: ~60%
- Metabolism: Renal
- Elimination half-life: ~48 minutes

Identifiers
- CAS Number: 151126-32-8
- PubChem CID: 16132446
- IUPHAR/BPS: 7482
- DrugBank: DB01278
- ChemSpider: 44241191
- UNII: D3FM8FA78T
- KEGG: D05595
- ChEMBL: ChEMBL1201669

Chemical and physical data
- Formula: C_{171}H_{267}N_{51}O_{53}S_{2}
- Molar mass: 3949.44 g·mol^{−1}
- 3D model (JSmol): Interactive image
- SMILES: CC[C@H](C)[C@@H](C(=O)N[C@@H](CC(C)C)C(=O)N1CCC[C@H]1C(=O)N2CCC[C@H]2C(=O)N[C@@H]([C@@H](C)O)C(=O)N[C@@H](CC(=O)N)C(=O)N[C@@H](C(C)C)C(=O)NCC(=O)N[C@@H](CO)C(=O)N[C@@H](CC(=O)N)C(=O)N[C@@H]([C@@H](C)O)C(=O)N[C@@H](Cc3ccc(cc3)O)C(=O)N)NC(=O)[C@@H]4CCCN4C(=O)CNC(=O)[C@H](Cc5ccccc5)NC(=O)[C@H](CC(=O)N)NC(=O)[C@H](CC(=O)N)NC(=O)[C@H](CO)NC(=O)[C@H](CO)NC(=O)[C@H](Cc6cnc[nH]6)NC(=O)[C@H](C(C)C)NC(=O)[C@H](CC(C)C)NC(=O)[C@H](Cc7ccccc7)NC(=O)[C@H](CC(=O)N)NC(=O)[C@H](C)NC(=O)[C@H](CC(C)C)NC(=O)[C@H](CCCNC(=N)N)NC(=O)[C@H](CCC(=O)N)NC(=O)[C@H]([C@@H](C)O)NC(=O)[C@H](C)NC(=O)[C@@H]8CSSC[C@@H](C(=O)N[C@H](C(=O)N[C@H](C(=O)N[C@H](C(=O)N[C@H](C(=O)N8)[C@@H](C)O)C)[C@@H](C)O)CC(=O)N)NC(=O)[C@H](CCCCN)N
- InChI: InChI=1S/C171H267N51O53S2/c1-21-81(12)130(163(268)207-110(56-78(6)7)169(274)222-53-33-42-118(222)170(275)221-52-32-41-117(221)160(265)219-135(89(20)230)167(272)206-109(66-125(180)238)151(256)212-128(79(8)9)161(266)186-68-126(239)192-111(70-223)154(259)203-107(64-123(178)236)152(257)218-134(88(19)229)166(271)195-98(136(181)241)57-92-43-45-94(231)46-44-92)214-159(264)116-40-31-51-220(116)127(240)69-187-141(246)101(58-90-34-24-22-25-35-90)199-148(253)105(62-121(176)234)201-149(254)106(63-122(177)235)202-155(260)112(71-224)209-156(261)113(72-225)208-146(251)103(60-93-67-184-75-188-93)205-162(267)129(80(10)11)213-150(255)100(55-77(4)5)198-145(250)102(59-91-36-26-23-27-37-91)200-147(252)104(61-120(175)233)196-137(242)82(13)189-144(249)99(54-76(2)3)197-142(247)96(39-30-50-185-171(182)183)193-143(248)97(47-48-119(174)232)194-165(270)132(86(17)227)215-138(243)83(14)190-157(262)114-73-276-277-74-115(210-140(245)95(173)38-28-29-49-172)158(263)204-108(65-124(179)237)153(258)217-131(85(16)226)164(269)191-84(15)139(244)216-133(87(18)228)168(273)211-114/h22-27,34-37,43-46,67,75-89,95-118,128-135,223-231H,21,28-33,38-42,47-66,68-74,172-173H2,1-20H3,(H2,174,232)(H2,175,233)(H2,176,234)(H2,177,235)(H2,178,236)(H2,179,237)(H2,180,238)(H2,181,241)(H,184,188)(H,186,266)(H,187,246)(H,189,249)(H,190,262)(H,191,269)(H,192,239)(H,193,248)(H,194,270)(H,195,271)(H,196,242)(H,197,247)(H,198,250)(H,199,253)(H,200,252)(H,201,254)(H,202,260)(H,203,259)(H,204,263)(H,205,267)(H,206,272)(H,207,268)(H,208,251)(H,209,261)(H,210,245)(H,211,273)(H,212,256)(H,213,255)(H,214,264)(H,215,243)(H,216,244)(H,217,258)(H,218,257)(H,219,265)(H4,182,183,185)/t81-,82-,83-,84-,85+,86+,87+,88+,89+,95-,96-,97-,98-,99-,100-,101-,102-,103-,104-,105-,106-,107-,108-,109-,110-,111-,112-,113-,114-,115-,116-,117-,118-,128-,129-,130-,131-,132-,133-,134-,135-/m0/s1; Key:TZIRZGBAFTZREM-MKAGXXMWSA-N

Pramlintide (trade name Symlin) is an injectable amylin analogue drug for diabetes (both type 1 and 2), developed by Amylin Pharmaceuticals (now a wholly owned subsidiary of AstraZeneca). Pramlintide is sold as an acetate salt.

== Pharmacology ==
Pramlintide is an analogue of amylin, a small peptide hormone that is released into the bloodstream by the β cells of the pancreas along with insulin after a meal. Like insulin, amylin is completely absent in individuals with Type I diabetes.

In synergy with endogenous amylin, pramlintide aids in the regulation of blood glucose by slowing gastric emptying, promoting satiety via hypothalamic receptors (different receptors than for GLP-1), and inhibiting inappropriate secretion of glucagon, a catabolic hormone that opposes the effects of insulin and amylin. Pramlintide also has effects in raising the acute first-phase insulin response threshold following a meal.

Both a reduction in glycated hemoglobin and weight loss have been shown in insulin-treated patients with type 2 diabetes taking pramlintide as an adjunctive therapy.

== Research Applications ==
In the research field, pramlintide has been experimented with and used as a potential treatment drug. Pramlintide has demonstrated its ability to decrease amyloid beta plaques in Alzheimer's disease mouse models.

== Approval ==
Pramlintide has been approved on 3/16/2005 by the FDA, for use by type 1 and type 2 diabetic patients who use insulin.(subscription required) Pramlintide allows patients to use less insulin, lowers average blood sugar levels, and substantially reduces what otherwise would be a large unhealthy rise in blood sugar that occurs in diabetics right after eating.

Apart from insulin analogs, pramlintide is the only drug approved by the FDA to lower blood sugar in type 1 diabetics since insulin in the early 1920s.

== Design and structure ==
Since native human amylin is highly amyloidogenic and potentially toxic, the strategy for designing pramlintide was to substitute residues from rat amylin, which is less amyloidogenic but presumably retains clinical activity. Proline residues are known to be structure-breaking residues, so these were directly grafted into the human sequence. Despite its enhanced stability compared to human amylin, however, pramlintide is still able to organize into amyloid material.

Amino acid sequences:

Pramlintide	KCNTATCATQRLANFLVHSSNNFGPILPPTNVGSNTY-(NH_{2})
Amylin	KCNTATCATQRLANFLVHSSNNFGAILSSTNVGSNTY-(NH_{2})
Rat amylin	KCNTATCATQRLANFLVRSSNNLGPVLPPTNVGSNTY-(NH_{2})

Pramlintide is a positively charged protein.
