= Adrenomedullin =

Mammalian protein found in humans

ADM

Identifiers
- Aliases: ADM, Adm, AM, PAMP, adrenomedullin
- External IDs: OMIM: 103275; MGI: 108058; GeneCards: ADM
Available structures
PDB	Ortholog search: PDBe RCSB
PDB	List of PDB id codes 2FLY, 2L7S, 4RWF

Gene location (Human)
Chr.	Chromosome 11 (human)
Band	11p15.4	Start	10,305,073 bp
Band	11p15.4	End	10,307,397 bp

Gene location (Mouse)
Chr.	Chromosome 7 (mouse)
Band	7 E3|7 57.7 cM	Start	110,226,868 bp
Band	7 E3|7 57.7 cM	End	110,229,027 bp
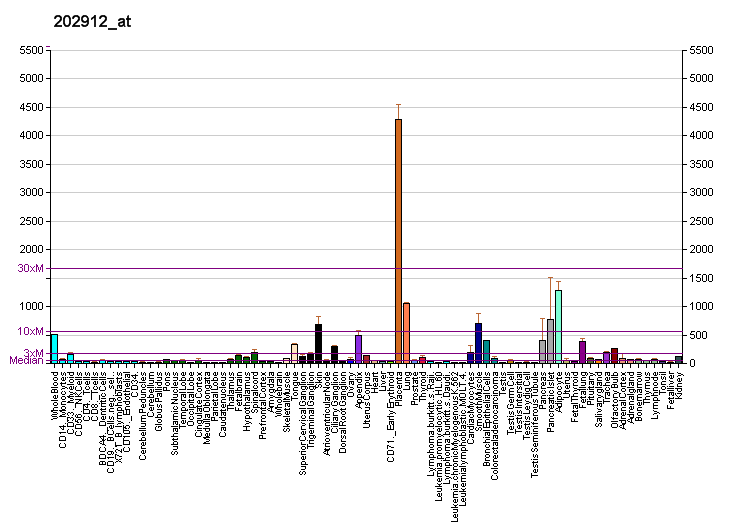
RNA expression pattern
Bgee	Human / Mouse (ortholog); Top expressed in: vena cava; beta cell; pericardium; cartilage tissue; saphenous vein; human penis; stromal cell of endometrium; decidua; synovial joint; glomerulus / Top expressed in: decidua; endothelial cell of lymphatic vessel; stroma of bone marrow; gastrula; superior cervical ganglion; epithelium of stomach; atrium; trophoblast giant cell; renal corpuscle; stria vascularis; More reference expression data
BioGPS	More reference expression data
Gene ontology
Molecular function	signaling receptor binding; hormone activity; adrenomedullin receptor binding; protein binding
Cellular component	extracellular region; cytoplasm; extracellular space
Biological process	negative regulation of cell population proliferation; response to hypoxia; neural tube closure; branching involved in labyrinthine layer morphogenesis; antibacterial humoral response; defense response to Gram-negative bacterium; receptor internalization; blood circulation; signal transduction; animal organ regeneration; cell-cell signaling; response to lipopolysaccharide; vascular associated smooth muscle cell development; defense response to Gram-positive bacterium; positive regulation of cytosolic calcium ion concentration; vasculogenesis; negative regulation of vasoconstriction; G protein-coupled receptor internalization; cAMP-mediated signaling; calcium ion homeostasis; response to starvation; development of the heart; regulation of the force of heart contraction; positive regulation of apoptotic process; response to yeast; response to cold; positive regulation of vasculogenesis; neuron projection regeneration; hormone secretion; antifungal humoral response; positive regulation of cell population proliferation; response to glucocorticoid; developmental growth; ageing; progesterone biosynthetic process; negative regulation of vascular permeability; androgen metabolic process; response to insulin; positive regulation of angiogenesis; response to organic substance; odontogenesis of dentin-containing tooth; spongiotrophoblast layer development; female pregnancy; response to wounding; cAMP biosynthetic process; antimicrobial humoral immune response mediated by antimicrobial peptide; regulation of systemic arterial blood pressure; positive regulation of heart rate; regulation of urine volume; G protein-coupled receptor signaling pathway; adenylate cyclase-activating G protein-coupled receptor signaling pathway; regulation of signaling receptor activity; amylin receptor signaling pathway; adrenomedullin receptor signaling pathway; inflammatory response; positive regulation of progesterone biosynthetic process
Sources:Amigo / QuickGO
Orthologs
Databases	NCBI: entry; OMA: entry
Species	Human	Mouse
Entrez	133	11535
Ensembl	ENSG00000148926	ENSMUSG00000030790
UniProt	P35318	P97297
RefSeq (mRNA)	NM_001124	NM_009627
RefSeq (protein)	NP_001115	NP_033757
Location (UCSC)	Chr 11: 10.31 – 10.31 Mb	Chr 7: 110.23 – 110.23 Mb
PubMed search
- Wikidata
View/Edit Human	View/Edit Mouse

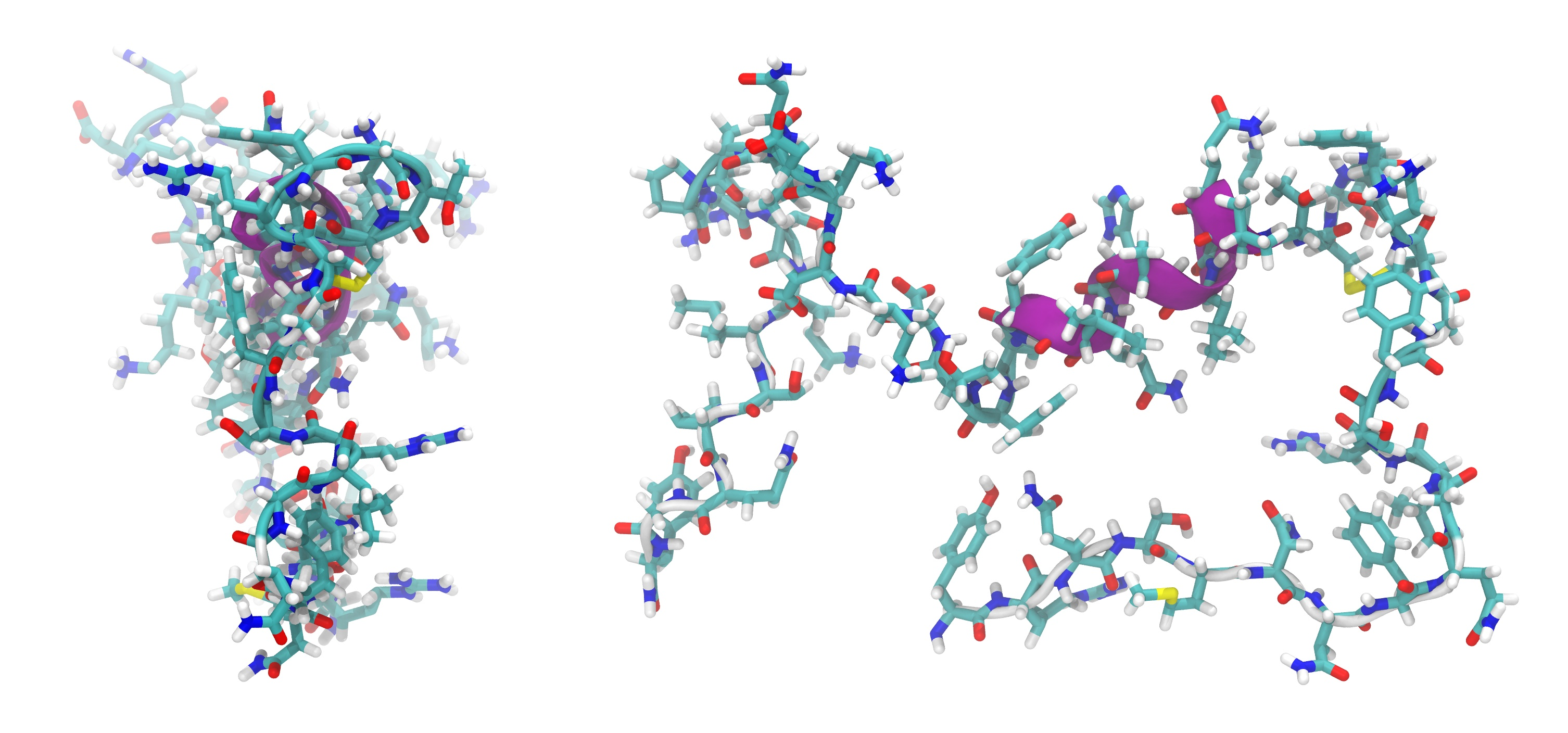
Structure of adrenomedullin

Adrenomedullin (ADM) is a peptide hormone that plays an important role in various physiological processes throughout the human body. Initially discovered in 1993 from a pheochromocytoma, a tumor of the adrenal medulla, this 52-amino acid peptide is now recognized for its diverse effects, including vasodilation, regulation of blood pressure, and maintenance of the vascular system. ADM is widely expressed in tissues and also found in the circulation, exerting its influence on the cardiovascular, lymphatic, and endocrine systems, as well as demonstrating anti-inflammatory and tissue-protective properties.

In humans, ADM is encoded by the ADM gene. A similar peptide named adreomedullin2 was reported in rats in 2004, which exhibits a similar function.

== Structure ==
The human ADM gene is localized to a single locus on Chromosome 11 with 4 exons and 3 introns. The ADM gene initially codes for a 185-amino acid precursor peptide, that can be differentially excised to form a number of peptides, including an inactive 53-amino acid AM, e PAMP, adrenotensin and ADM95-146. Mature human ADM is activated to form a 52-amino acid, 6-amino acid ring, that shares moderate structural similarity to the calcitonin family of regulatory peptides (calcitonin, CGRP and amylin). Circulating ADM consists of both the amidated active form (15%) and the glycated inactive form (85%). It has a plasma half-life of 22min, a mean clearance rate of 27.4 mL/kg/min, and an apparent volume of distribution of 880 ± 150 mL/kg.

Adrenomedullin consists of 52 amino acids, has 1 intramolecular disulfide bond, and shows a slight homology with the calcitonin gene-related peptide (CGRP). The precursor, called preproadrenomedullin, consists of 185 amino acids and can be cleaved by plasma kallikrein at the Lys-Arg and Arg-Arg sites. By RNA-blot analysis, human adrenomedullin mRNA was found to be expressed in all tissues, and most highly expressed in the placenta, fat cells, lung, pancreatic islets, smooth muscle, and skin.

== Function ==
Adrenomedullin (ADM) is a multifunctional peptide hormone that plays an important role in the homeostasis of the cardiovascular system and in inflammatory response. It acts as a potent vasodilator, regulating vascular tone and blood pressure through both endothelium-dependent and independent mechanisms. ADM exerts protective effects on the cardiovascular system by inhibiting apoptosis in endothelial cells, reducing oxidative stress, and regulating vascular smooth muscle cell proliferation. In the heart, it increases cardiac output and augments myocardial contractility. Beyond its cardiovascular functions, ADM demonstrates significant anti-inflammatory properties, modulating cytokine production and secretion in macrophages. It also contributes to the maintenance of vascular integrity, potentially reducing vascular permeability during inflammatory conditions. In addition, ADM has been implicated in angiogenesis, protection of organs, and tissue repair. Because of its wide-ranging effects, it has potential therapeutic applications in a variety of diseases, including inflammatory bowel disease, sepsis, and cardiovascular disorders.

== Receptors ==
Adrenomedullin (AM) exerts its actions through combinations of the calcitonin receptor-like receptor (CALCRL) or CLR; and either (Receptor activity-modifying protein) 2 (RAMP2) or RAMP3, (known as AM1 and AM2 receptors, respectively). Both transduce the hormone binding to intracellular signaling via second messenger cascades. The AM2 receptor has a low affinity for CGRP, but this is of no physiological relevance. Unlike the classical one ligand-one receptor notion of receptor signalling, the interaction of both CALCRL and RAMP at the membrane is required for AM to mediate its action: neither can bind the hormone (and therefore transduce a signal) alone. Stimulation by AM of its receptor increases production of both cyclic AMP (cAMP) and nitric oxide.

Before the discovery of the RAMPs and the identification of heteromeric receptors for the calcitonin family of peptides, a single G Protein coupled Adrenomedullin receptor was identified, but more recent reports have cast doubts as to its importance in the major effects of adrenomedullin. In more recent research, the roles of the AM1 and AM2 receptors have been clarified through studies in genetically manipulated mice. The adrenomedullin knockout is an embryonic lethal phenotype that dies mid-gestation from a condition known as hydrops fetalis. The CALCRL or CLR KO mouse recapitulates the same phenotype, as it lacks both the AM1 and AM2 receptors (incidentally confirming the lack of physiological significance for the earlier single protein AM receptor discovered by Kapas). RAMP2 KO mice also recapitulate the same phenotype, showing that major physiological effects of AM are transduced by the AM1 receptor. Even the heterozygote RAMP 2 mice have disturbed physiology with unusual bone and mammary gland defects, and very aberrant endocrinology, leading to poor fertility and lactation problems. What is very surprising is that the effect of deletion of RAMP3 has no deleterious effects and seems to confer advantages due to higher than normal bone mass, and reduced weight gain in older age.

== Clinical significance ==
=== Cardiovascular health ===
While AM could be an important biomarker for bacterial infections like sepsis, AM has diminished value in its utility for cardiovascular diseases (CVD), attributable to its minimal increase in these conditions and reduced half-life. AM is associated with controlling vascular integrity, blood pressure, and general cardiovascular function. Since AM has been noted for its exacerbated levels in intense diseases with an elevated concern for mortality, AM could still have some value as a predictive biomarker of harmful clinical consequences for an array of cardiovascular illnesses. AM has conservatory effects against arteriosclerosis and vascular harm. Extended AM administration or hyper-expression of its target gene in rodent model organisms diminishes vascular hyperplasia, fatty streak construction, and intimal expansion. AM also has angiogenic characteristics, leading to organ and tissue maintenance by reducing the risk of ischemic diseases. AM binds to particular receptors like calcitonin gene-related peptide (CGRP) receptors, which affects the cardiovascular system by contributing to vasodilation as well as elevated heart rate and blood pressure.

=== Gastrointestinal health ===
AM function can be compared to another peptide called pro-adrenomedullin N-terminal 20 peptide (PAMP), which both originate from a common precursor leading to angiogenesis, vasodilation, and anti-inflammatory processes. These two peptides are expressed in the gastrointestinal (GI) tract at a mass level, serving as GI hormones controlling processes like insulin secretion and gastric emptying. Past studies reveal that AM and PAMP also impact gut microbiome composition by fostering the development of beneficial bacteria (i.e., Bifidobacterium and Lactobacillus) and diminishing detrimental microbes.

=== Sepsis ===
AM concentrations are substantially elevated during intense inflammation from disorders like sepsis, rendering AM a potentially viable therapeutic agent and clinical mode of monitoring such inflammation. AM contributes to vasodilation, which could be detrimental in leading to septic shock. Researchers seek to mitigate this effect while maintaining ADM's antimicrobial, anti-inflammatory, and endothelial-protective characteristics by employing antibodies that bind to ADM's N-terminus or co-administering ADM with ADM-binding protein-1, which collectively extend ADM's half-life and increase its maintenance role while minimizing this detrimental vasodilation. While AM has been discussed in regard to its implications for bacterial infections, such as sepsis, prior research explores its potential connection to viral infections too. This annunciates the importance of continual investigation into AM's mechanisms with viral illnesses through exploring its roles in inflammation and immune regulation.

=== Tumor angiogenesis ===
AM contributes to tumor angiogenesis, given its capability to enhance smooth muscle and vascular endothelial cell development in addition to its role in ischemic revascularization. Similarly to other solid tumors, AM expression is increased by hypoxia, which has been regarded as an important regulator of tumor development with respect to the findings from animal and in vitro studies, although the translation application to human tumor development is constrained. AM is affiliated with endothelium-derived CC chemokine ligand 2 (CCL2) in the tumor microenvironment, employing genetic deletions and in vivo models to display functional associations. Tumor-derived AM stimulates angiogenesis and promotes tumor growth. Also, endothelial-derived CCL2 decreased AM-induced tumor growth. Deprivation of the AM receptor CALCRL or the G-protein Gs in endothelial cells diminishes both tumor and endothelial cell growth. Removing tumor cell CCR2 or endothelial CCL2 would undo this tumor growth decrease demonstrated in mice without endothelial CALCRL or Gs, displaying a reciprocal regulatory loop between AM and CCL2. AM contributes to cancer pathogenesis through heightened vascularization to equip tumors with nutrients and oxygen, more intense cell phenotypes, and increased cell proliferation. AM receptors (AM1 and AM2) have disparate effects in an array of cancers, with separate regulatory mechanisms and expression patterns. Preclinical studies have displayed the potential of AM receptor antagonists and AM-neutralizing antibodies to diminish tumor growth, angiogenesis, and metastasis.
