= Calcitonin gene-related peptide =

Peptide hormone in animals

Calcitonin gene-related peptide 1

Identifiers
- Symbol: CALCA
- Alt. symbols: CALC1
- NCBI gene: 796
- HGNC: 1437
- OMIM: 114130
- RefSeq: NM_001741
- UniProt: P06881

Other data
- Locus: Chr. 11 p15.2
Search for
- Structures: Swiss-model
- Domains: InterPro

Calcitonin gene-related peptide 2

Identifiers
- Symbol: CALCB
- Alt. symbols: CALC2
- NCBI gene: 797
- HGNC: 1438
- OMIM: 114160
- RefSeq: NM_000728
- UniProt: P10092

Other data
- Locus: Chr. 11 p15.2
Search for
- Structures: Swiss-model
- Domains: InterPro

Calcitonin gene-related peptides (CGRP) are a group of two similar neuropeptides that belong to the calcitonin family. The two types of CGRP in humans are alpha-CGRP (α-CGRP, also known as CGRP I) and beta-CGRP (β-CGRP, also known as CGRP II). α-CGRP is a 37-amino acid neuropeptide formed by alternative splicing of the calcitonin/CGRP gene located on chromosome 11. β-CGRP is less studied. In humans, β-CGRP differs from α-CGRP by three amino acids and is encoded in a separate, nearby gene. The CGRP family includes calcitonin (CT), adrenomedullin (AM), and amylin (AMY).

== Function ==
CGRP is produced in both peripheral and central neurons. It is a potent peptide vasodilator and can function in the transmission of nociception. In the spinal cord, the function and expression of CGRP may differ depending on the location of synthesis. CGRP is derived mainly from the cell bodies of motor neurons when synthesized in the ventral horn of the spinal cord and may contribute to the regeneration of nervous tissue after injury. Conversely, CGRP is derived from dorsal root ganglion when synthesized in the dorsal horn of the spinal cord and may be linked to the transmission of pain. In the trigeminal vascular system, the cell bodies of the trigeminal ganglion are the main source of CGRP. CGRP is thought to play a role in cardiovascular homeostasis and nociception. In the heart, CGRP acts as a chronotrope by increasing heart rate. Apart from these attributes, CGRP is known to modulate the autonomic nervous system and plays a role in ingestion.

CGRP has moderate effects on calcium homeostasis compared to its extensive actions in other areas, such as the autonomic nervous system.

As a neuropeptide, CGRP acts as an appetite suppressant and contributes to gastric acid secretion. It also functions in temperature homeostasis, increases heart rate, and plays a role in the release of the pituitary hormones in a paracrine manner. Because of these characteristics, it has been said that CGRP functions more as a neurotransmitter than a hormone.

=== Stem cell mobilization ===
CGRP has a role in hematopoietic stem cell (HSC) mobilization. In investigations carried out in 2021, treatment with CGRP resulted in significantly increased CGRP levels in the bone marrow extracellular fluid and substantially increased the number of HSCs mobilized by granulocyte colony-stimulating factor (G-CSF). The authors of the 2021 study concluded that G-CSF-induced HSC mobilization is regulated by the nociceptor nerve-derived neuropeptide CGRP. This peptide exerts its effect on HSC mobilization via the receptor activity-modifying protein 1 (RAMP1) pathway.

== Receptors ==
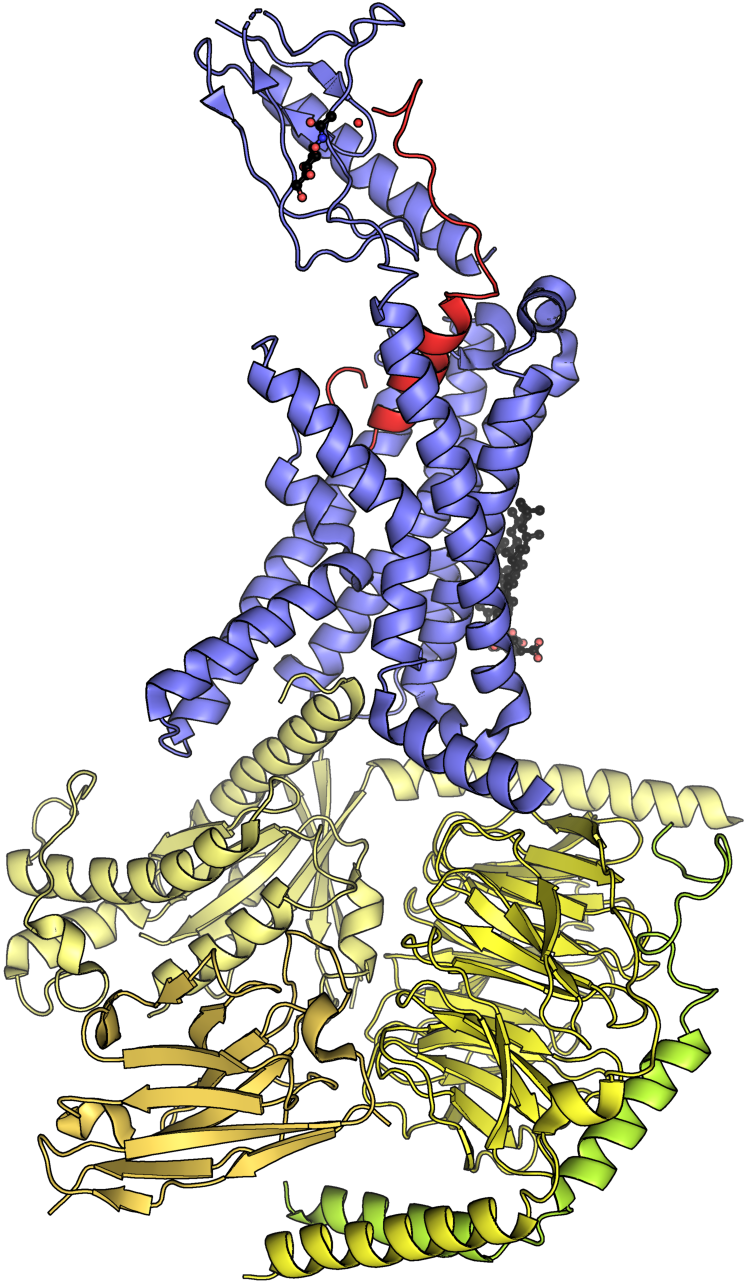
Structure of the human calcitonin receptor-Gs complex. The calcitonin transmembrane receptor (blue) is bound to human calcitonin (red) and the G_{s} complex (yellow). PDB: 7TYO

CGRP mediates its effects through a heteromeric receptor composed of a G protein-coupled receptor called calcitonin receptor-like receptor (CALCRL) and RAMP1. CGRP receptors are found throughout all the body, suggesting that the protein may modulate a variety of physiological functions in all major systems (e.g., respiratory, endocrine, gastrointestinal, immune, and cardiovascular). These transmembrane receptors form folded accordion-like structures embedded in the cell membrane with loops of protein on the inside (intracellular loops) and outside (extracellular loops) of the membrane. The second extracellular loop is fundamental for ligand-induced activation, with key interactions of R274/Y278/D280/W283.

== Regulation ==
Regulation of the CGRP gene is in part controlled by the expression of the mitogen-activated protein kinase (MAPK) signaling pathway and cytokines like TNFα and iNOS. 5HT1 receptor agonists like sumatriptan increase intracellular calcium, which causes decreases in CGRP promoter activity.

CGRP receptors are found in myelinated A-fiber axons which is required for ligand specificity and function of the receptor. The CGRP receptor has three subunits: receptor activity-modifying protein 1 (RAMP1), calcitonin-like receptor (CLR) and receptor component protein (RCP). The complex central receptor is the G protein-coupled receptor calcitonin receptor-like receptor (CALCRL) which is necessary for CGRP and adrenomedullin (AM receptors). For function CGRP, CALCRL must coincide with RAMP1 where the ligand-binding domain of CGRP is located. It also includes two cytoplasmic proteins that associate with the CALCRL-RAMP1 to form signal transduction. CALCRL contains the Gα subunit, which activates adenylyl cyclase and cAMP-dependent signaling pathways. Receptor-mediated transduction elevates in intracellular cAMP activate protein kinase A, which results in the phosphorylation of multiple targets, including potassium- sensitive ATP channels (KATP channels), extracellular signal-related kinases and transcription factors such as cAMP-responsive element-binding protein (CREB). In smooth muscle of the neurovascular region, the elevation of cAMP upon CGRP activation results in vasodilation of the blood vessel. Chronic exposure to CGRP causes degradation of lysosomes.

== Research ==
Increased levels of CGRP have been reported in migraine and temporomandibular joint disorder patients as well as a variety of other diseases such as cardiac failure, hypertension, and sepsis.

There is evidence to suggest that CGRP has a role in the body preventing the development of hypertension and cardiovascular pathologies associated with hypertension.

Preclinical evidence suggests that, during a migraine, activated primary sensory neurons (meningeal nociceptors) in the trigeminal ganglion release CGRP from their peripherally projecting nerve endings located within the meninges. This CGRP then binds to and activates CGRP receptors located around meningeal vessels, causing vasodilation, mast cell degranulation, and plasma extravasation. Human observations have further implicated the role of CGRP in the pathophysiology of migraine. Activation of primary sensory neurons in the trigeminal vascular system in humans can cause the release of CGRP. During some migraine attacks, increased concentrations of CGRP can be found in both saliva and in plasma drawn from the external jugular vein. Furthermore, intravenous administration of alpha-CGRP is able to induce headache in individuals susceptible to migraine.

== Medicines ==
Treatments based on monoclonal antibodies have been produced related to CGRP or CGRP receptors. They have been shown to be effective in patients who experience migraine headaches, both with and without aura, and both episodic and chronic cluster headache. These are the first class of preventive medications originally designed and approved for people with migraine. Due to the nature of the monoclonal antibodies, they must be administered parenterally, preferably by injection.

The first CGRP related medication approved by the FDA is called erenumab (trade name Aimovig), produced by pharmaceutical company Amgen and Novartis. It interacts with the CGRP receptor. It is injected once monthly with a dose of 70 or 140 mg. Few adverse effects were reported (most related to injection site reactions) and patients had a significant reduction in migraines.

The second approved by the FDA is fremanezumab (trade name Ajovy), produced by the Teva Pharmaceuticals company. It interacts with the CGRP protein, whose expression is related to migraine attacks. It may be administered monthly or every three months, giving options for users. Trials have shown a reduction of greater than 50% of migraine days for those who responded. There were few significant side effects during trials, most related to injection site reactions.

The third CGRP medication approved by the FDA is galcanezumab (trade name Emgality), produced by the Eli Lilly and Company. It interacts with the CGRP protein, whose expression is related to migraine attacks. It is injected once a month, after the first month having a double dose. The main reported side effects are injection site reactions, although there are a growing number of reports of severe side effects from a minority of patients.

Approved by the FDA in February 2020, ubrogepant (Ubrelvy) is an oral medication manufactured by AbbVie. Also approved that month, eptinezumab (Vyepti), is an intravenous migraine prophylactic medication manufactured by Lundbeck. Rimegepant (Nurtec ODT) subsequently became the first oral CGRP receptor antagonist to be approved by the FDA for both acute migraine treatment (approved February 2020) and prevention of episodic migraine (approved June 2021). It is manufactured by Pfizer.

In September 2021 the FDA approved Qulipta (atogepant), the first oral CGRP receptor antagonist approved to prevent chronic migraine.

The phytocannabinoids delta-9 tetrahydrocannabinol (Δ9-THC) and its oxidative byproduct cannabinol (CBN) are found to induce a CB1 and CB2 cannabinoid receptor-independent release of calcitonin gene-related peptide from capsaicin-sensitive perivascular sensory nerves, an action that other psychotropic cannabinoids cannot do.
