= Calcitonin receptor =

Protein found in humans

CALCR

Identifiers
- Aliases: CALCR, CRT, CT-R, CTR, CTR1, calcitonin receptor
- External IDs: OMIM: 114131; MGI: 101950; GeneCards: CALCR
Available structures
PDB	Ortholog search: PDBe RCSB
PDB	List of PDB id codes 5II0

Gene location (Human)
Chr.	Chromosome 7 (human)
Band	7q21.3	Start	93,424,486 bp
Band	7q21.3	End	93,574,730 bp

Gene location (Mouse)
Chr.	Chromosome 6 (mouse)
Band	6 A1|6 1.81 cM	Start	3,685,680 bp
Band	6 A1|6 1.81 cM	End	3,764,714 bp
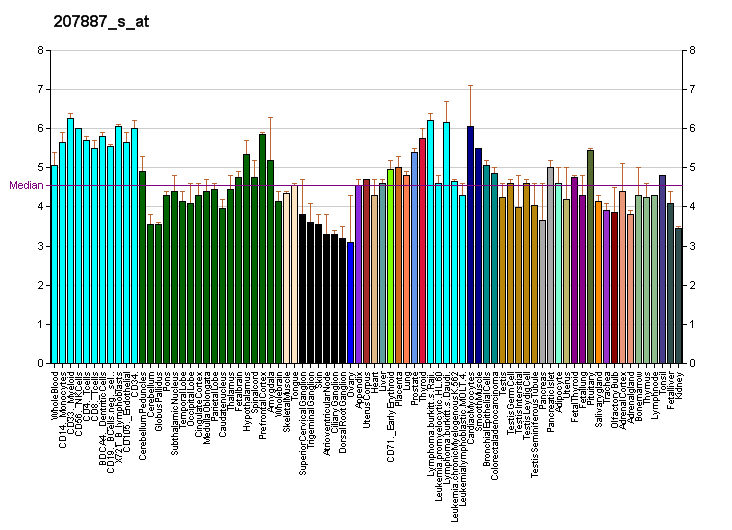

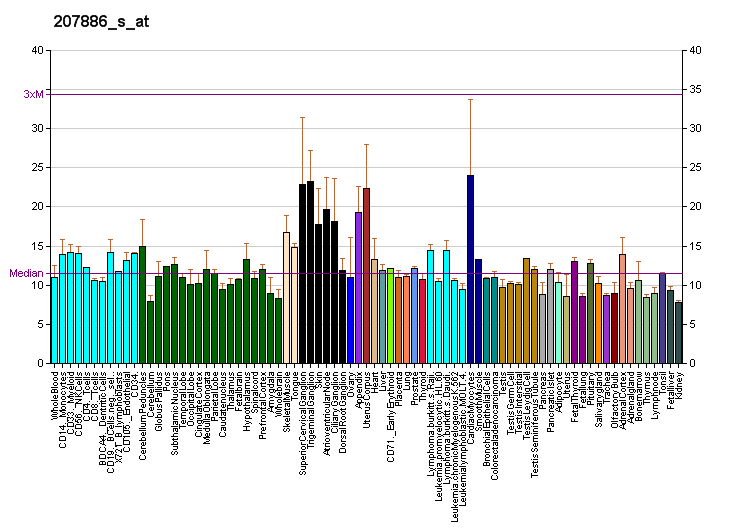
RNA expression pattern
Bgee	Human / Mouse (ortholog); Top expressed in: tibia; hypothalamus; muscle of thigh; human kidney; placenta; metanephros; skeletal muscle tissue; renal cortex; ligament; tendon / Top expressed in: arcuate nucleus; median eminence; dorsomedial hypothalamic nucleus; paraventricular nucleus of hypothalamus; suprachiasmatic nucleus; nucleus accumbens; morula; lateral hypothalamus; ventromedial nucleus; embryo; More reference expression data
BioGPS	More reference expression data
Gene ontology
Molecular function	G protein-coupled receptor activity; calcitonin receptor activity; calcitonin binding; signal transducer activity; protein binding; transmembrane signaling receptor activity; amyloid-beta binding; calcitonin gene-related peptide receptor activity; amylin receptor activity
Cellular component	integral component of membrane; membrane; plasma membrane; integral component of plasma membrane; axon; amylin receptor complex 1; amylin receptor complex 2; amylin receptor complex 3
Biological process	positive regulation of adenylate cyclase activity; adenylate cyclase-activating G protein-coupled receptor signaling pathway; positive regulation of cytosolic calcium ion concentration; receptor internalization; response to glucocorticoid; activation of phospholipase C activity; activation of adenylate cyclase activity; cell surface receptor signaling pathway; protein transport; protein localization to plasma membrane; signal transduction; G protein-coupled receptor signaling pathway; positive regulation of gene expression; positive regulation of protein kinase A signaling; positive regulation of cell death; positive regulation of peptidyl-serine phosphorylation; cross-receptor inhibition within G protein-coupled receptor heterodimer; positive regulation of protein kinase B signaling; positive regulation of ERK1 and ERK2 cascade; amylin receptor signaling pathway; response to amyloid-beta; positive regulation of calcium ion import across plasma membrane
Sources:Amigo / QuickGO
Orthologs
Databases	NCBI: entry; OMA: entry
Species	Human	Mouse
Entrez	799	12311
Ensembl	ENSG00000004948	ENSMUSG00000023964
UniProt	P30988	Q60755
RefSeq (mRNA)	NM_001742; NM_001164737; NM_001164738	NM_001042725; NM_007588; NM_001355192; NM_001377018
RefSeq (protein)	NP_001158209; NP_001158210; NP_001733	NP_001036190; NP_031614; NP_001342121; NP_001363947
Location (UCSC)	Chr 7: 93.42 – 93.57 Mb	Chr 6: 3.69 – 3.76 Mb
PubMed search
- Wikidata
View/Edit Human	View/Edit Mouse

The calcitonin receptor (CT) is a G protein-coupled receptor that binds the peptide hormone calcitonin and is involved in maintenance of calcium homeostasis, particularly with respect to bone formation and metabolism.

CT works by activating the G-proteins G_{s} and G_{q} often found on osteoclasts, on cells in the kidney, and on cells in a number of regions of the brain. It may also affect the ovaries in women and the testes in men.

The function of the CT receptor protein is modified through its interaction with Receptor activity-modifying proteins (RAMPs), forming the multimeric amylin receptors AMY_{1} (CT + RAMP1), AMY_{2} (CT + RAMP2), and AMY_{3} (CT+ RAMP3).

Preclinical studies have suggested that dual amylin and calcitonin receptor agonists may be more effective than amylin receptor agonists for obesity and type II diabetes.

== Interactions ==
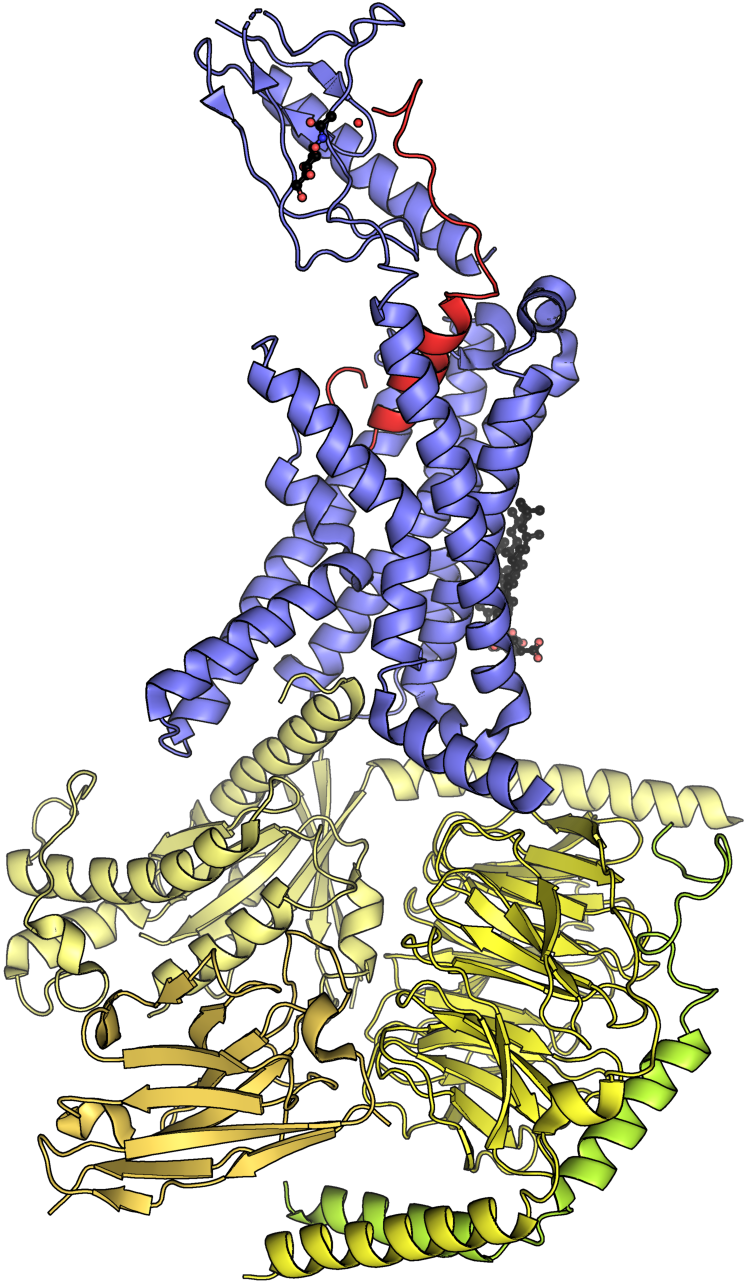
Structure of human calcitonin receptor-G_{s} complex. The transmembrane calcitonin receptor (blue) is bound to human calcitonin (red) and the G_{s} complex (yellow). PDB: 7TYO

Calcitonin receptor has been shown to interact with Apolipoprotein B and LRP1.
