= Paliperidone palmitate =

Atypical antipsychotic medication

Clinical data
- Trade names: Invega Hafyera, Invega Sustenna, Invega Trinza, others
- Other names: PP; PP1M; PP3M; PP6M; JNS-010; RO-92670; RO92670
- MedlinePlus: a607005
- License data: US DailyMed: Paliperidone_palmitate
- Routes of administration: Intramuscular
- Drug class: Atypical antipsychotic

Legal status
- Legal status: US: ℞-only; EU: Rx-only; In general: ℞ (Prescription only)

Identifiers
- IUPAC name: [3-[2-[4-(6-fluoro-1,2-benzoxazol-3-yl)piperidin-1-yl]ethyl]-2-methyl-4-oxo-6,7,8,9-tetrahydropyrido[1,2-a]pyrimidin-9-yl] hexadecanoate
- CAS Number: 199739-10-1
- PubChem CID: 9852746
- DrugBank: DB01267
- ChemSpider: 8028457
- UNII: R8P8USM8FR
- KEGG: D05340
- ChEBI: CHEBI:83807
- ChEMBL: ChEMBL2107360
- CompTox Dashboard (EPA): DTXSID70870217
- ECHA InfoCard: 100.208.402

Chemical and physical data
- Formula: C_{39}H_{57}FN_{4}O_{4}
- Molar mass: 664.907 g·mol^{−1}
- 3D model (JSmol): Interactive image
- SMILES: CCCCCCCCCCCCCCCC(=O)OC1CCCN2C1=NC(=C(C2=O)CCN3CCC(CC3)C4=NOC5=C4C=CC(=C5)F)C
- InChI: InChI=1S/C39H57FN4O4/c1-3-4-5-6-7-8-9-10-11-12-13-14-15-18-36(45)47-34-17-16-24-44-38(34)41-29(2)32(39(44)46)23-27-43-25-21-30(22-26-43)37-33-20-19-31(40)28-35(33)48-42-37/h19-20,28,30,34H,3-18,21-27H2,1-2H3; Key:VOMKSBFLAZZBOW-UHFFFAOYSA-N

Paliperidone palmitate (PP), sold under the brand names Invega Sustenna, Xeplion, Shansida (Chinese: 善思达), Erzofri and Psokadron for the once‑monthly formulation, and as Invega Trinza/Trevicta (three‑monthly) and Invega Hafyera/Byannli (six‑monthly), is a long-acting injectable atypical antipsychotic of the benzisoxazole class, used in the treatment of schizophrenia and schizoaffective disorder. The original product was developed by Janssen Pharmaceuticals, Inc. (Johnson & Johnson), which continues to manufacture most of the branded versions worldwide. It is an antipsychotic ester – specifically the palmitate ester of paliperidone – and acts as a long-lasting form of paliperidone. Paliperidone palmitate is formulated as an aqueous suspension, has a strong smell similar to alcohol, and is administered by intramuscular injection into deltoid or gluteal muscle once every 1, 3, or 6 months depending on the formulation. A formulation for injection once every 6 months is also pending regulatory approval as of September 2021.

== Pharmacokinetics ==
With the once-monthly formulation of paliperidone palmitate, the time to peak is 13 days and the elimination half-life is 25 to 49 days; for the 3-month formulation, the time to peak is 30 to 33 days and the half-life is 84 to 95 days (deltoid muscle) or 118 to 139 days (gluteal). These data come from a 2021 review whose authors included employees of Janssen Research & Development, the manufacturer of paliperidone palmitate. The peak-to-trough ratio of paliperidone palmitate at steady state ranges from 1.56 to 1.70 with the 1- and 3-month formulations. No pharmacokinetic data for the 6-month formulation has been released as of January 2021.

However, a 2025 case report described a patient who still had measurable plasma paliperidone concentrations in the low therapeutic range 886 days (2.5 years) after her last injection, indicating that in some individuals the drug may be released from the depot far longer than the predicted half‑life.

The pharmacokinetic profile was originally derived from a 2009 pooled analysis of 18,530 paliperidone concentration samples from 1,795 subjects across six Phase I trials and five Phase II and III trials funded by Johnson & Johnson Pharmaceutical Research and Development, LLC.

Invega Sustenna, Invega Trinza, and Invega Hafyera all utilize nanoparticle technology. The NanoCrystal® technology used in all three long-acting paliperidone products is manufactured by Alkermes plc. The technology was originally developed by Elan Drug Technologies, a business unit of Elan Corporation, plc; Alkermes acquired the technology when it purchased Elan's drug delivery unit in 2011 for approximately $960 million. Nanocrystals of paliperidone palmitate form a depot or reservoir in the muscle. The 3-month formulation of paliperidone palmitate, Invega Trinza or Trevicta, has larger crystal sizes than the 1-month formulation, which dissolve more slowly at the injection site, allowing for its longer duration.

Pharmacokinetics of long-acting injectable antipsychotics
Medication	Brand name	Class	Vehicle	Dosage	T_{max}	t_{1/2} single	t_{1/2} multiple	logP^{c}	Ref
Aripiprazole lauroxil	Aristada	Atypical	Water^{a}	441–1064 mg/4–8 weeks	24–35 days	?	54–57 days	7.9–10.0	
Aripiprazole monohydrate	Abilify Maintena	Atypical	Water^{a}	300–400 mg/4 weeks	7 days	?	30–47 days	4.9–5.2	
Bromperidol decanoate	Impromen Decanoas	Typical	Sesame oil	40–300 mg/4 weeks	3–9 days	?	21–25 days	7.9	
Clopentixol decanoate	Sordinol Depot	Typical	Viscoleo^{b}	50–600 mg/1–4 weeks	4–7 days	?	19 days	9.0	
Flupentixol decanoate	Depixol	Typical	Viscoleo^{b}	10–200 mg/2–4 weeks	4–10 days	8 days	17 days	7.2–9.2	
Fluphenazine decanoate	Prolixin Decanoate	Typical	Sesame oil	12.5–100 mg/2–5 weeks	1–2 days	1–10 days	14–100 days	7.2–9.0	
Fluphenazine enanthate	Prolixin Enanthate	Typical	Sesame oil	12.5–100 mg/1–4 weeks	2–3 days	4 days	?	6.4–7.4	
Fluspirilene	Imap, Redeptin	Typical	Water^{a}	2–12 mg/1 week	1–8 days	7 days	?	5.2–5.8	
Haloperidol decanoate	Haldol Decanoate	Typical	Sesame oil	20–400 mg/2–4 weeks	3–9 days	18–21 days		7.2–7.9	
Olanzapine pamoate	Zyprexa Relprevv	Atypical	Water^{a}	150–405 mg/2–4 weeks	7 days	?	30 days	–	
Oxyprothepin decanoate	Meclopin	Typical	?	?	?	?	?	8.5–8.7	
Paliperidone palmitate	Invega Sustenna	Atypical	Water^{a}	39–819 mg/4–12 weeks	13–33 days	25–139 days	?	8.1–10.1	
Perphenazine decanoate	Trilafon Dekanoat	Typical	Sesame oil	50–200 mg/2–4 weeks	?	?	27 days	8.9	
Perphenazine enanthate	Trilafon Enanthate	Typical	Sesame oil	25–200 mg/2 weeks	2–3 days	?	4–7 days	6.4–7.2	
Pipotiazine palmitate	Piportil Longum	Typical	Viscoleo^{b}	25–400 mg/4 weeks	9–10 days	?	14–21 days	8.5–11.6	
Pipotiazine undecylenate	Piportil Medium	Typical	Sesame oil	100–200 mg/2 weeks	?	?	?	8.4	
Risperidone	Risperdal Consta	Atypical	Microspheres	12.5–75 mg/2 weeks	21 days	?	3–6 days	–	
Zuclopentixol acetate	Clopixol Acuphase	Typical	Viscoleo^{b}	50–200 mg/1–3 days	1–2 days	1–2 days		4.7–4.9	
Zuclopentixol decanoate	Clopixol Depot	Typical	Viscoleo^{b}	50–800 mg/2–4 weeks	4–9 days	?	11–21 days	7.5–9.0	
Note: All by intramuscular injection. Footnotes: ^{a} = Microcrystalline or nanocrystalline aqueous suspension. ^{b} = Low-viscosity vegetable oil (specifically fractionated coconut oil with medium-chain triglycerides). ^{c} = Predicted, from PubChem and DrugBank. Sources: Main: See template.

Invega Sustenna is supplied as a white to off-white aqueous extended-release suspension for intramuscular injection in single-dose prefilled syringes. In addition to the active ingredient, paliperidone palmitate, the formulation contains the following inactive ingredients: polysorbate 20, polyethylene glycol 4000, citric acid monohydrate, disodium hydrogen phosphate anhydrous, sodium dihydrogen phosphate monohydrate, sodium hydroxide, and water for injection.

== History ==
Paliperidone palmitate was first approved by the United States Food and Drug Administration (FDA) on July 31, 2009, under the brand name Invega Sustenna, for the acute and maintenance treatment of schizophrenia in adults. Health Canada followed on June 30, 2010, issuing a Notice of Compliance for the same indication. Australia's Therapeutic Goods Administration registered the product on July 28, 2010. The European Medicines Agency (EMA) authorized the once‑monthly injection under the brand name Xeplion on March 4, 2011. In China, the drug was approved in January 2012 and launched later that year under the brand name Shansida (善思达); marketed by Xian-Janssen Pharmaceutical Limited (which is the Janssen (Johnson & Johnson) subsidiary in China), it was the first once-monthly long-acting injectable atypical antipsychotic available in the country. The approval was based on a multi-center clinical trial funded by Xian-Janssen Pharmaceutical Ltd. which demonstrated that Shansida monotherapy was non-inferior to a combination of oral risperidone and long-acting injectable risperidone microspheres (brand name Risperdal Consta) for acute schizophrenia. In Japan, the once‑monthly injection was approved in September 2013 under the brand name Xeplion (ゼプリオン, Zepurion) and was launched on November 19, 2013.

Globally, the paliperidone palmitate long-acting injectable market was valued at approximately US$4.1 billion in 2024 and is projected to reach US$6.3 billion by 2031. In the United States alone, sales of the Invega franchise (including Sustenna, Trinza, and Hafyera) reached $3.1 billion in 2024, an 8% increase over the previous year. The market is served primarily by Janssen Pharmaceuticals, with generic competition expected to begin after the key U.S. patent expires on January 26, 2031.

== Adverse effects ==
=== Post‑marketing surveillance and safety signals ===
Following the launch of the once‑monthly paliperidone palmitate formulation (Xeplion) in Japan on 19 November 2013, the Early Post‑Marketing Phase Vigilance (EPPV) system detected a signal of increased mortality: 32 deaths were reported among an estimated 11,000 patients during the six‑month EPPV period. The most common causes of death were sudden cardiac death (12 confirmed and 4 suspected cases), suicide (7 cases), and neuroleptic malignant syndrome (4 cases). Of the 32 deaths, 59.4% were in patients over 50 years of age, 71.9% had cardiovascular risk factors, and 78.1% were receiving antipsychotic polypharmacy. Earlier in the EPPV period, in April 2014, it had been reported that 21 Japanese people who had received shots of the long-acting injectable paliperidone palmitate had died, out of 10,700 individuals prescribed the drug.

An observational study of the French pharmacovigilance database identified 13 deaths and 14 life‑threatening events among 473 paliperidone palmitate-related adverse drug reaction reports between 1 January 2013 and 31 December 2019. The reactions were primarily cardiorespiratory, with cardiac arrests and sudden unexpected deaths often occurring 10–14 days after a once‑monthly injection (or 11–24 days after a three‑monthly injection), consistent with peak plasma drug levels, leading the authors to hypothesize that supratherapeutic drug levels may underlie these events.

A 2025 real‑world pharmacovigilance study using the U.S. FDA Adverse Event Reporting System (FAERS) and the Japanese Adverse Drug Event Report (JADER) database identified 27,672 paliperidone palmitate‑related adverse event reports in FAERS and 1,065 in JADER. Unexpected safety signals not listed in the drug label included psychosexual disorders, prolactin‑producing pituitary tumours, suicide attempt, and sudden death. The median onset time for all adverse drug events was 40 days.

=== Systematic reviews identifying safety signals ===
A 2013 comprehensive systematic review by Dr. Salvatore Gentile concluded that second‑generation long‑acting injectable antipsychotics (SGA‑LAIs) "seem to also show unforeseen and worrisome safety signals," and noted that "worsening of psychotic symptoms and depression could also be associated with both risperidone‑LAI and paliperidone palmitate." The leading cause of death among patients enrolled in risperidone‑LAI studies was suicide. A 2017 systematic update by the same author concluded that SGA‑LAIs "do not offer advantages in safety compared with first‑generation antipsychotic LAIs or oral antipsychotics," and highlighted weight gain, hyperprolactinemia, and the finding that the three‑monthly paliperidone palmitate formulation still lacked exhaustive safety data.

=== Post-injection delirium/sedation syndrome ===
Post-injection delirium/sedation syndrome (PDSS) is a serious adverse event previously considered specific to olanzapine pamoate (Zyprexa Relprevv) among LAI antipsychotics. PDSS is characterized by heavy sedation, possible coma, and/or delirium following injection, believed to result from inadvertent intravascular drug entry. Early industry-sponsored analyses of clinical trial and post-marketing databases found no cases of PDSS in patients receiving paliperidone palmitate across 10 completed trials (3,817 subjects, 33,906 injections), leading to the conclusion that PDSS was not associated with paliperidone palmitate. However, a 2024 post-marketing case report published in the Journal of Clinical Psychopharmacology documented a case of PDSS following paliperidone palmitate administration. A 48-year-old male patient with bipolar affective disorder received two 234 mg loading doses of paliperidone palmitate (Invega Sustenna) one week apart. Two days after the second injection, he developed trembling, rigidity, weakness, and drowsiness. His symptoms worsened over the following days to include slurred speech and difficulty walking and talking. The authors recommended routine measurement of baseline antipsychotic blood levels as part of long-acting injectable management to help identify patients at elevated risk.

== Society and culture ==
=== FDA label expansion and marketing controversy ===
In January 2018, the U.S. Food and Drug Administration (FDA) expanded the label for Invega Sustenna to state that the drug "may delay time to arrest and/or incarceration" in patients with schizophrenia. The revised label was based on the Paliperidone Palmitate Research in Demonstrating Effectiveness (PRIDE) study, a Janssen‑sponsored, open‑label, 15‑month trial that enrolled 444 adults aged 18 to 65 who had been taken into custody at least twice in the previous two years, and at least once in the prior 90 days; about 60% had a concurrent substance use disorder and 14% were homeless. Participants were randomized to once‑monthly paliperidone palmitate or one of seven daily oral antipsychotics. The study, conducted between May 2010 and December 2013, found a significantly longer time to treatment failure—a composite measure that included arrest and/or incarceration, psychiatric hospitalization, treatment discontinuation because of safety or tolerability, treatment supplementation because of inadequate efficacy, need for increased psychiatric services to prevent hospitalization, and suicide—in the injectable group than in the oral antipsychotic group.

The label expansion, which granted Janssen three additional years of market exclusivity for paliperidone palmitate, attracted significant criticism from mental health experts and the media. In February 2018, The Marshall Project published an investigation reporting that the new label allowed Johnson & Johnson to market Invega Sustenna as a way to keep people out of prison or jail. John Snook, executive director of the Treatment Advocacy Center, described the "stay-out-of-jail" marketing approach as a "depressing commentary" on the state of mental health treatment. Critics noted that the PRIDE study did not compare Invega Sustenna with other long-acting injectable antipsychotics, only with daily oral antipsychotics, and that the reduced rate of incarceration was likely due to improved drug adherence rather than a unique property of paliperidone palmitate.

A 2022 review of internal pharmaceutical industry documents, published in the Journal of Correctional Health Care, identified Janssen as one of at least two companies that directly marketed antipsychotics to jails and prisons to increase sales. The review found that marketing strategies included targeted promotions, indirect "educational" advertising, and efforts to influence state formulary advisory boards.

Concerns have also been raised about industry influence on the evidence base for long‑acting injectable (LAI) antipsychotics. In a 2024 paper in Accountability in Research, Lisa Cosgrove and colleagues presented a case analysis arguing that systematic reviews comparing LAIs to oral antipsychotics can be "shaped by commercial interests" and that financial conflicts of interest among review authors may "undermine patient‑centered models of recovery and care."

=== Deaths ===
==== Fatal outcomes in case reports ====
A 2017 case report details the severe, prolonged episode of drug-induced parkinsonism in a 68‑year‑old man in the United States that ultimately led to his death roughly five months after receiving two injections of paliperidone palmitate (234 mg followed one week later by 156 mg). The authors state that "practitioners should be cognizant of the potential long‑term consequences of paliperidone LAI."

A 47‑year‑old man (Japan, 2017) developed acute and persistent circulatory failure after receiving paliperidone palmitate injections. Despite surgical removal of the hip tissue suspected of containing the paliperidone palmitate depot, he died of multiple organ failure. When examining the removed tissue, it seemed that paliperidone palmitate was not present, and Janssen, the drug manufacturer, does not recommend this approach since it is practically impossible to locate the depot of paliperidone. The optimal treatment of long‐acting injectable (LAI) antipsychotic poisonings is unknown.

In 2019, it was reported that a 33-year-old man in France was found dead in his room at his parents' home after receiving a single 819 mg injection of Trevicta (paliperidone palmitate three‑monthly formulation). Toxicological analysis of femoral blood revealed paliperidone at 240 μg/L; no other substance was detected. The authors concluded that paliperidone poisoning was the highly likely cause of death.

A 2021 case report documented a 72‑year‑old woman with Lewy body dementia who developed fatal neuroleptic malignant syndrome (NMS) after receiving a single 156 mg intramuscular injection of paliperidone palmitate; she remained comatose and died following a prolonged hospital course after palliative care measures were initiated. The use of high‑dose, high‑potency, or long‑acting injectable formulations of antipsychotics increases the risk of developing NMS. Multiple additional case reports of NMS linked to paliperidone palmitate have been published, including a 63-year-old man (2025) who survived after treatment, and cases in a 29-year-old woman who developed severe, treatment‑refractory NMS after two doses of paliperidone palmitate (2025) and a 24-year-old man (2025).

==== Suicides and homicides ====
Tyson Mathews (1983–2013) died in Teralba, New South Wales, Australia, on 7 November 2013 just six days after his 30th birthday. The cause of death was determined to be suicide by hanging. At the time of his death, he was subject to a community treatment order (CTO) mandating depot antipsychotic injections of paliperidone palmitate (brand name Invega Sustenna). The inquest specifically investigated whether this medication was a contributing factor. His mother was concerned about the appropriateness of paliperidone palmitate. She observed that after the dose was increased, her son's psychotic symptoms settled, but he became "markedly more depressed." She questioned whether the drug contributed to his condition and death. Despite his depression (neuroleptic dysphoria) worsening, Ms. Mathews felt healthcare professionals did not fully acknowledge the deterioration.

Andrew Jeffrey Rich (1989–2019) was a Wisconsin man placed under court-ordered assisted outpatient treatment (AOT) following a breakdown in May 2017. He was required to receive regular injections of Invega Sustenna under Wisconsin's Chapter 51 commitment law. Over approximately 18 months, recommitment orders were repeatedly extended on the basis that he denied having a mental illness and would likely stop medication if released, despite his psychiatrist acknowledging no observed psychotic symptoms during that period and Rich living and working independently in the community. Rich reported severe side effects from the injections, including emotional blunting and loss of physical sensation. Following a final recommitment order in December 2018, he died by suicide on January 11, 2019, at age 29. His mother, attorney Elizabeth Rich, founded the nonprofit Andrew's V.O.I.C.E. (Victory Over Involuntary Commitment Excesses) to advocate for mental health law reform. His case was documented in a July 2019 investigative article by Robert Whitaker in Mad in America as part of a broader critique of AOT law evidence and practice.

A 2023 expert analysis by physician and researcher Peter C. Gøtzsche published in Mad in America documented the case of a Swedish patient, Tuva Andersson, who was forcibly administered paliperidone palmitate depot injections at a forensic psychiatric facility without a confirmed psychotic diagnosis, over her explicit objection. Documented adverse effects included severe muscle stiffness, loss of motor function, and marked cognitive deterioration, which treating clinicians attributed to her underlying condition rather than the medication. An additional medication for Parkinsonism was added rather than the paliperidone being reduced. Andersson died by suicide in 2019, at age 37. A post-mortem assessment by an independent psychiatrist retained by the regional insurance authority concluded that her care had been deficient, that increasing suicide risk had not been met with corresponding interventions, and that her death was likely caused by failures in her treatment. An official post-mortem report by a regional chief physician noted that the period of forensic psychiatric care had devastating consequences the patient never recovered from.

On January 17, 2020, a video titled "Medical Help" was uploaded to YouTube by 26-year-old Wail Ardab of Palatka, Florida, who developed severe dystonia and insomnia after taking Invega Trinza injections. On March 5, 2020, Ardab committed suicide by jumping from Memorial Bridge in Palatka.

On December 28, 2021, 19-year-old Peyton Moyer fatally shot his mother and her boyfriend in Watkinsville, Georgia, while under the influence of the long-acting injectable antipsychotic paliperidone palmitate (Invega Sustenna). On November 2, 2023, Moyer was sentenced to life in prison. His family has alleged that Moyer had autism and was hospitalized for methamphetamine-induced psychosis at age 15 after he had been given methamphetamine by his maternal uncle; he then began receiving monthly injections of paliperidone palmitate, a drug not approved for use in patients under 18, without the consent of his father, who was his legal guardian. His family attributes the homicides to a rebound psychosis they say was triggered by the Invega Sustenna injections.

From June 2023 to April 2024, Serbian television presenter Bojana Janković (née Nikolić), known for hosting the show City, posted to the internet forum Bluelight that she was bedridden with symptoms consistent with neuroleptic-induced deficit syndrome after receiving six depot injections of paliperidone palmitate (four shots of Invega Sustenna and two shots of Invega Trinza). She wrote: "My main problem is 0 motivation, low energy and anhedonia. Also i have cognitive issues. Beddriden mostly..." The injections were prescribed by her private psychiatrist and friend around the time of her divorce from Ognjen Janković, a member of the hip-hop group Beogradski Sindikat. She died by suicide in Belgrade on April 19, 2024, aged 46.

=== Lawsuits ===
From 2019 to 2024, Maria Francesca Gioia, a former medical student acting as a pro se plaintiff, filed nine product liability lawsuits against Janssen Pharmaceuticals and related parties. She alleged that taking Invega Sustenna (paliperidone palmitate) caused her memory loss, hypothyroidism, Horner's syndrome, nerve damage, motor tremors, vocal tics, confusion, loss of taste and sensation, post-traumatic stress disorder, and metabolic syndrome (including hypertension, diabetes, and stroke), which ended her career as a primary care physician. All nine lawsuits were dismissed on procedural grounds: Gioia I–II for failure to state a claim, Gioia III for failure to prosecute, and Gioia IV–V for lack of subject matter jurisdiction. The court also noted that the side effects she alleged were already listed on Invega's FDA-approved warning label.

In June 2020, a Florida lawsuit was filed on behalf of Lilith Geohaghan, an 82-year-old assisted living resident with Lewy body dementia, against the assisted living facility and several healthcare providers. The complaint alleged that despite her family's explicit instructions to the contrary, she was administered multiple large doses of Invega Sustenna in late 2018. The lawsuit claims that the injections led to a rapid decline in her health, resulting in nearly a dozen falls and two hospitalizations within just over a month. Her treating physicians subsequently diagnosed her with toxic encephalopathy, directly attributing the condition to the Invega Sustenna injections. The complaint further alleged that the injections caused a permanent loss of mobility and function from which she never recovered, describing the use of the drug as a form of "chemical restraint" and outside the standard of care. The case highlights concerns about the off-label use of antipsychotics in elderly dementia patients, a practice for which the drug carries a black box warning from the FDA due to an increased risk of death.

Billy Driver, Jr. is a California prisoner who has been involuntarily administered the long-acting injectable antipsychotic Invega Sustenna (paliperidone palmitate) since at least 2019. He has filed multiple federal civil rights lawsuits alleging the forced medication causes severe side effects, including gynecomastia, borderline diabetes, heart palpitations, chest pain, and kidney pain. In one suit, Driver v. Naranjo (filed January 2024), Driver alleged that psychiatrist Dr. Naranjo at the Richard J. Donovan Correctional Facility (RJD) in San Diego had twice threatened to use physical force if Driver continued to refuse the injections. A judge dismissed Driver v. Naranjo in February 2025, noting that Driver's involuntary medication was authorized by active court orders issued through California's Keyhea process. Since 2020, Driver has undergone six Keyhea hearings, at each of which a court found that if unmedicated he would be a danger to others, that he lacked insight into his own need for medication, and that he could not manage his own treatment. Driver, who is incarcerated at Salinas Valley State Prison (CDCR #D-35391), has filed numerous pro se civil rights actions under 42 U.S.C. § 1983 at multiple California facilities. While his lawsuits have consistently been dismissed on procedural grounds, he has appealed some decisions to the U.S. Court of Appeals for the Ninth Circuit.

In May and June 2022, Adilah Patton, a 28‑year‑old pretrial detainee in Indianapolis, was forcibly injected twice with Invega Sustenna while in custody at the Marion County Adult Detention Center. A federal lawsuit filed on her behalf alleges that the injections were administered without a medical assessment, a prescription, or the consent of her court‑appointed guardian. The lawsuit describes the injections as assault, battery, excessive force, and violations of the Fourteenth Amendment right to informed consent.

In September 2024, Haitian immigrant Cassandra Fameux filed a criminal complaint alleging that her husband, Michigan anesthesiologist Dr. Paul Gregory St. Claire, and psychiatrist Dr. Dominic Barberio forcibly injected her monthly from 2017 to 2021 with unprescribed Invega Sustenna—sometimes at doses up to 256 mg—as "punishment" when her husband was angry. Divorce court testimony and a recorded conversation indicate Barberio admitted she was not schizophrenic; two psychiatrists found she had PTSD, not bipolar disorder or schizophrenia. A subsequent police investigation led to a recommendation that her husband be charged with domestic assault.

=== Brand names ===
In May 2015, a formulation of paliperidone palmitate was approved by the U.S. Food and Drug Administration under the brand name Invega Trinza. A similar prolonged release suspension was approved in 2016 by the European Medicines Agency originally under the brand name Paliperidone Janssen, later renamed to Trevicta. In September 2021, a newer formulation of paliperidone palmitate, Invega Hafyera, was approved by the US FDA.
