= C22H25ClN2OS =

The molecular formula C_{22}H_{25}ClN_{2}OS (molar mass: 400.96 g/mol) may refer to:

- Clopenthixol, a typical antipsychotic drug
- Zuclopenthixol, a typical antipsychotic neuroleptic drug
