= Perphenazine enanthate =

Typical antipsychotic medication

Clinical data
- Trade names: Decentan Depot, Peratsin Enantaatti, Trilafon, Trilafon Enantato, Trilafon Enantat, Trilifan Retard
- Other names: Perphenazine enantate
- Routes of administration: Intramuscular injection
- Drug class: Typical antipsychotic
- ATC code: N05AB03 (WHO)

Legal status
- Legal status: In general: ℞ (Prescription only)

Identifiers
- IUPAC name: 2-[4-[3-(2-chlorophenothiazin-10-yl)propyl]piperazin-1-yl]ethyl heptanoate
- CAS Number: 17528-28-8
- PubChem CID: 62871
- DrugBank: DB14651
- ChemSpider: 56601
- UNII: Z6RS3DKN8J
- KEGG: D08342
- CompTox Dashboard (EPA): DTXSID40169963
- ECHA InfoCard: 100.037.739

Chemical and physical data
- Formula: C_{28}H_{38}ClN_{3}O_{2}S
- Molar mass: 516.14 g·mol^{−1}
- 3D model (JSmol): Interactive image
- SMILES: CCCCCCC(=O)OCCN1CCN(CC1)CCCN2C3=CC=CC=C3SC4=C2C=C(C=C4)Cl
- InChI: InChI=1S/C28H38ClN3O2S/c1-2-3-4-5-11-28(33)34-21-20-31-18-16-30(17-19-31)14-8-15-32-24-9-6-7-10-26(24)35-27-13-12-23(29)22-25(27)32/h6-7,9-10,12-13,22H,2-5,8,11,14-21H2,1H3; Key:PWEGQJCIAMJJHC-UHFFFAOYSA-N

Perphenazine enanthate, sold under the brand name Trilafon Enantat among others, is a typical antipsychotic and a depot antipsychotic ester which is used in the treatment of schizophrenia and has been marketed in Europe. It is formulated in sesame oil and administered by intramuscular injection and acts as a long-lasting prodrug of perphenazine. Perphenazine enanthate is used at a dose of 25 to 200 mg once every 2 weeks by injection, with a time to peak levels of 2 to 3 days and an elimination half-life of 4 to 7 days.

Pharmacokinetics of long-acting injectable antipsychotics
Medication	Brand name	Class	Vehicle	Dosage	T_{max}	t_{1/2} single	t_{1/2} multiple	logP^{c}	Ref
Aripiprazole lauroxil	Aristada	Atypical	Water^{a}	441–1064 mg/4–8 weeks	24–35 days	?	54–57 days	7.9–10.0	
Aripiprazole monohydrate	Abilify Maintena	Atypical	Water^{a}	300–400 mg/4 weeks	7 days	?	30–47 days	4.9–5.2	
Bromperidol decanoate	Impromen Decanoas	Typical	Sesame oil	40–300 mg/4 weeks	3–9 days	?	21–25 days	7.9	
Clopentixol decanoate	Sordinol Depot	Typical	Viscoleo^{b}	50–600 mg/1–4 weeks	4–7 days	?	19 days	9.0	
Flupentixol decanoate	Depixol	Typical	Viscoleo^{b}	10–200 mg/2–4 weeks	4–10 days	8 days	17 days	7.2–9.2	
Fluphenazine decanoate	Prolixin Decanoate	Typical	Sesame oil	12.5–100 mg/2–5 weeks	1–2 days	1–10 days	14–100 days	7.2–9.0	
Fluphenazine enanthate	Prolixin Enanthate	Typical	Sesame oil	12.5–100 mg/1–4 weeks	2–3 days	4 days	?	6.4–7.4	
Fluspirilene	Imap, Redeptin	Typical	Water^{a}	2–12 mg/1 week	1–8 days	7 days	?	5.2–5.8	
Haloperidol decanoate	Haldol Decanoate	Typical	Sesame oil	20–400 mg/2–4 weeks	3–9 days	18–21 days		7.2–7.9	
Olanzapine pamoate	Zyprexa Relprevv	Atypical	Water^{a}	150–405 mg/2–4 weeks	7 days	?	30 days	–	
Oxyprothepin decanoate	Meclopin	Typical	?	?	?	?	?	8.5–8.7	
Paliperidone palmitate	Invega Sustenna	Atypical	Water^{a}	39–819 mg/4–12 weeks	13–33 days	25–139 days	?	8.1–10.1	
Perphenazine decanoate	Trilafon Dekanoat	Typical	Sesame oil	50–200 mg/2–4 weeks	?	?	27 days	8.9	
Perphenazine enanthate	Trilafon Enanthate	Typical	Sesame oil	25–200 mg/2 weeks	2–3 days	?	4–7 days	6.4–7.2	
Pipotiazine palmitate	Piportil Longum	Typical	Viscoleo^{b}	25–400 mg/4 weeks	9–10 days	?	14–21 days	8.5–11.6	
Pipotiazine undecylenate	Piportil Medium	Typical	Sesame oil	100–200 mg/2 weeks	?	?	?	8.4	
Risperidone	Risperdal Consta	Atypical	Microspheres	12.5–75 mg/2 weeks	21 days	?	3–6 days	–	
Zuclopentixol acetate	Clopixol Acuphase	Typical	Viscoleo^{b}	50–200 mg/1–3 days	1–2 days	1–2 days		4.7–4.9	
Zuclopentixol decanoate	Clopixol Depot	Typical	Viscoleo^{b}	50–800 mg/2–4 weeks	4–9 days	?	11–21 days	7.5–9.0	
Note: All by intramuscular injection. Footnotes: ^{a} = Microcrystalline or nanocrystalline aqueous suspension. ^{b} = Low-viscosity vegetable oil (specifically fractionated coconut oil with medium-chain triglycerides). ^{c} = Predicted, from PubChem and DrugBank. Sources: Main: See template.

== See also ==
- List of antipsychotics § Antipsychotic esters
