= Aripiprazole lauroxil =

Chemical compound

Clinical data
- Trade names: Aristada, Aristada Initio
- Other names: N-Lauroyloxymethylaripiprazole; ALKS-9070; ALKS-9072; RDC-3317; Dodecanoic acid-[7-[4-[4-(2,3-dichlorophenyl)-1-piperazinyl]butoxy]-3,4-dihydro-2-oxo-1(2H)-quinolinyl]methyl ester
- AHFS/Drugs.com: Monograph
- MedlinePlus: a615048
- License data: US DailyMed: Aripiprazole lauroxil
- Pregnancy category: AU: C
- Routes of administration: Intramuscular
- ATC code: None

Legal status
- Legal status: US: ℞-only

Identifiers
- IUPAC name: [7-[4-[4-(2,3-Dichlorophenyl)piperazin-1-yl]butoxy]-2-oxo-3,4-dihydroquinolin-1-yl]methyl dodecanoate
- CAS Number: 1259305-29-7
- PubChem CID: 49831411
- DrugBank: DB14185
- ChemSpider: 28651973
- UNII: B786J7A343
- KEGG: D10364
- ChEBI: CHEBI:90930
- ChEMBL: ChEMBL2219425
- CompTox Dashboard (EPA): DTXSID60154997
- ECHA InfoCard: 100.261.570

Chemical and physical data
- Formula: C_{36}H_{51}Cl_{2}N_{3}O_{4}
- Molar mass: 660.72 g·mol^{−1}
- 3D model (JSmol): Interactive image
- SMILES: CCCCCCCCCCCC(=O)OCN1C(=O)CCC2=C1C=C(C=C2)OCCCCN3CCN(CC3)C4=C(C(=CC=C4)Cl)Cl
- InChI: InChI=1S/C36H51Cl2N3O4/c1-2-3-4-5-6-7-8-9-10-16-35(43)45-28-41-33-27-30(19-17-29(33)18-20-34(41)42)44-26-12-11-21-39-22-24-40(25-23-39)32-15-13-14-31(37)36(32)38/h13-15,17,19,27H,2-12,16,18,20-26,28H2,1H3; Key:DDINXHAORAAYAD-UHFFFAOYSA-N

Aripiprazole lauroxil, sold under the brand name Aristada among others, is a long-acting injectable atypical antipsychotic that was developed by Alkermes. It is an N-acyloxymethyl prodrug of aripiprazole that is administered via intramuscular injection once every four to eight weeks for the treatment of schizophrenia. Aripiprazole lauroxil was approved by the US Food and Drug Administration (FDA) in October 2015.

Aripiprazole is also available in a once every two months long-acting injectable under the brand name Abilify Asimtufii.

== Medical uses ==
Aripiprazole lauroxil is indicated for the treatment of schizophrenia in adults.

Aripiprazole lauroxil is a longer-lasting and injectable version of the oral antipsychotic aripiprazole.Aripiprazole lauroxil, along with other drugs in its family, are not approved for treatment of the elderly with dementia-related psychosis.

== Side effects ==
The most common side effects are akathisia. According to the drug's warning label and safety information, the side effects are large in variety.

The complete list of side effects include: akathisia, contraindication cerebrovascular adverse reactions (including stroke), neuroleptic malignant syndrome, tardive dyskinesia, metabolic changes, hyperglycemia/diabetes mellitus, dyslipidemia, weight gain, orthostatic hypotension, leukopenia, neutropenia, agranulocytosis, seizures, potential for cognitive and motor impairment, difficulties with body temperature regulation, dysphagia, injection site reactions (rash, swelling, redness, irritation at the point of injection), dystonia and pregnancy and nursing complications.

=== Discontinuation ===
The British National Formulary recommends a gradual withdrawal when discontinuing antipsychotics to avoid acute withdrawal syndrome or rapid relapse. Symptoms of withdrawal commonly include nausea, vomiting, and loss of appetite. Other symptoms may include restlessness, increased sweating, and trouble sleeping. Less commonly there may be a feeling of the world spinning, numbness, or muscle pains. Symptoms generally resolve after a short period of time.

There is tentative evidence that discontinuation of antipsychotics can result in psychosis. It may also result in reoccurrence of the condition that is being treated. Rarely tardive dyskinesia can occur when the medication is stopped.

=== Overdosing ===
The largest known case of ingestion with a known outcome involved a 1260 mg of oral aripiprazole, 42 times the recommended dose. The patient survived and fully recovered.

Common adverse reactions, reported in at least 5% of overdose cases, included vomiting, somnolence, and tremor. Other clinically important signs and symptoms of overdoses include acidosis, aggression, atrial fibrillation, bradycardia, coma, confusion, convulsion, depressed level of consciousness, hypertension, hypokalemia, hypotension, lethargy, loss of consciousness, pneumonia aspiration, respiratory arrest, status epilepticus, and tachycardia.

== Pharmacology ==
=== Mechanism of action ===
Arristada is injected intramuscularly as an atypical antipsychotic. In one 12-week clinical trial involving 622 participants, the efficacy of extended aripiprazole was demonstrated. Its mechanism of action is not completely known, but is thought to be converted by enzyme-mediated hydrolysis to N-hydroxymethyl aripiprazole. The hydroxymethyl aripiprazole is then hydrolysed to aripiprazole. Efficacy could be mediated through a combination of partial agonist activity D_{2} and 5-HT_{1A} receptors and antagonist activity at 5-HT_{2A} receptors. Since it is a newly approved drug by the FDA, many validation of mechanisms of action are still being studied.

=== Pharmacodynamics ===
Aripiprazole exhibits high affinity for serotonin 5-HT_{1A}, 5-HT_{2A} receptors, dopamine D_{2}, and dopamine D_{3}. Moderate affinity is exhibited for serotonin 5-HT_{7}, α_{1}-adrenergic, dopamine D_{4}, histamine H_{1}, and serotonin reuptake site. No affinity for cholinergic muscarinic receptors have been found.

=== Pharmacokinetics ===
Aristada's activity in the body is due to aripiprazole and also dehydro-aripiprazole. Dehydro-aripiprazole has been shown to have affinities for D_{2} receptors. These D_{2} receptors have similarities to aripiprazole whereas they represent 30-40% of exposure of aripiprazole in plasma.

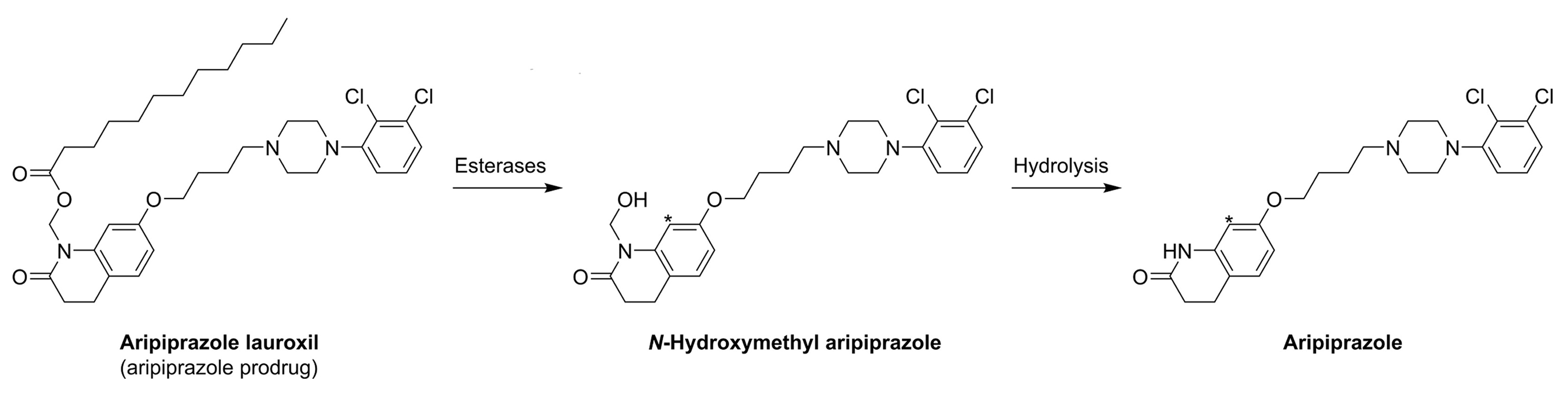
Bioactivation of aripiprazole lauroxil (N-lauroyloxymethylaripiprazole) into aripiprazole, with N-hydroxymethylaripiprazole as an intermediate.

After five to six days of the single intramuscular injection appearance of aripiprazole in circulation, it additionally will be released for 36 days. In the fourth monthly injection, consecutive doses of Aristada will reach steady-state. With additional supplements of the oral aripiprazole at a dosage of 21 days during the first dose of Aristada, aripiprazole concentrations within 4 days can reach therapeutic levels.

Pharmacokinetics of long-acting injectable antipsychotics
Medication	Brand name	Class	Vehicle	Dosage	T_{max}	t_{1/2} single	t_{1/2} multiple	logP^{c}	Ref
Aripiprazole lauroxil	Aristada	Atypical	Water^{a}	441–1064 mg/4–8 weeks	24–35 days	?	54–57 days	7.9–10.0	
Aripiprazole monohydrate	Abilify Maintena	Atypical	Water^{a}	300–400 mg/4 weeks	7 days	?	30–47 days	4.9–5.2	
Bromperidol decanoate	Impromen Decanoas	Typical	Sesame oil	40–300 mg/4 weeks	3–9 days	?	21–25 days	7.9	
Clopentixol decanoate	Sordinol Depot	Typical	Viscoleo^{b}	50–600 mg/1–4 weeks	4–7 days	?	19 days	9.0	
Flupentixol decanoate	Depixol	Typical	Viscoleo^{b}	10–200 mg/2–4 weeks	4–10 days	8 days	17 days	7.2–9.2	
Fluphenazine decanoate	Prolixin Decanoate	Typical	Sesame oil	12.5–100 mg/2–5 weeks	1–2 days	1–10 days	14–100 days	7.2–9.0	
Fluphenazine enanthate	Prolixin Enanthate	Typical	Sesame oil	12.5–100 mg/1–4 weeks	2–3 days	4 days	?	6.4–7.4	
Fluspirilene	Imap, Redeptin	Typical	Water^{a}	2–12 mg/1 week	1–8 days	7 days	?	5.2–5.8	
Haloperidol decanoate	Haldol Decanoate	Typical	Sesame oil	20–400 mg/2–4 weeks	3–9 days	18–21 days		7.2–7.9	
Olanzapine pamoate	Zyprexa Relprevv	Atypical	Water^{a}	150–405 mg/2–4 weeks	7 days	?	30 days	–	
Oxyprothepin decanoate	Meclopin	Typical	?	?	?	?	?	8.5–8.7	
Paliperidone palmitate	Invega Sustenna	Atypical	Water^{a}	39–819 mg/4–12 weeks	13–33 days	25–139 days	?	8.1–10.1	
Perphenazine decanoate	Trilafon Dekanoat	Typical	Sesame oil	50–200 mg/2–4 weeks	?	?	27 days	8.9	
Perphenazine enanthate	Trilafon Enanthate	Typical	Sesame oil	25–200 mg/2 weeks	2–3 days	?	4–7 days	6.4–7.2	
Pipotiazine palmitate	Piportil Longum	Typical	Viscoleo^{b}	25–400 mg/4 weeks	9–10 days	?	14–21 days	8.5–11.6	
Pipotiazine undecylenate	Piportil Medium	Typical	Sesame oil	100–200 mg/2 weeks	?	?	?	8.4	
Risperidone	Risperdal Consta	Atypical	Microspheres	12.5–75 mg/2 weeks	21 days	?	3–6 days	–	
Zuclopentixol acetate	Clopixol Acuphase	Typical	Viscoleo^{b}	50–200 mg/1–3 days	1–2 days	1–2 days		4.7–4.9	
Zuclopentixol decanoate	Clopixol Depot	Typical	Viscoleo^{b}	50–800 mg/2–4 weeks	4–9 days	?	11–21 days	7.5–9.0	
Note: All by intramuscular injection. Footnotes: ^{a} = Microcrystalline or nanocrystalline aqueous suspension. ^{b} = Low-viscosity vegetable oil (specifically fractionated coconut oil with medium-chain triglycerides). ^{c} = Predicted, from PubChem and DrugBank. Sources: Main: See template.

== Chemistry ==
In contrast to many other depot antipsychotics, aripiprazole lauroxil is described as a non-ester chemical modification. It is specifically N-lauroyloxymethylaripiprazole. However, the N-lauroyloxymethyl moiety contains a laurate ester, technically making aripiprazole lauroxil an antipsychotic ester. More specifically, aripiprazole lauroxil is the laurate ester of N-hydroxymethylaripiprazole. Following cleavage of the laurate ester, N-hydroxymethylaripiprazole is further metabolized to aripiprazole, making aripiprazole lauroxil a prodrug of aripiprazole with N-hydroxymethylaripiprazole as an intermediate.

== Society and culture ==
In October 2022, Lavell Najah Lane, a 29-year-old man with schizoaffective disorder, died at the Spartanburg County Detention Center in South Carolina. Lane was found dead in his cell on October 3, 2022, approximately six hours after being booked. The Spartanburg County coroner listed his cause of death as neuroleptic malignant syndrome (NMS), a disorder caused by an adverse reaction to antipsychotic medication. His family's attorney alleged the NMS resulted from two injections of aripiprazole lauroxil — totaling 1,739 mg — administered at the detention center on September 29, days before his death. A wrongful death lawsuit filed against Spartanburg County and the Sheriff's Office alleged that jail employees failed to research Lane's medical history to determine whether the drug was appropriate and failed to monitor for lethal side effects. Surveillance video reportedly captured Lane experiencing seizure-like activity in his cell for hours with no staff response. According to the coroner's report, NMS can occur at any time during the use of neuroleptic (antipsychotic) drugs, but is most common within the first two weeks of starting a medication; stopping the medication immediately is a recommended treatment for NMS, but the report noted this can be difficult when a slow-release medication has been administered. The South Carolina Attorney General's Office declined to recommend criminal charges, citing the coroner's classification of the death as natural. Lane's family subsequently filed a second lawsuit against Spartanburg Regional Health Services over its role in his treatment prior to his arrest.

== See also ==
- Aripiprazole (oral)
