= Perphenazine =

Antipsychotic medication

- Skeletal formula of perphenazine

- Ball-and-stick model of perphenazine

Clinical data
- AHFS/Drugs.com: Monograph
- MedlinePlus: a682165
- Pregnancy category: AU: C
- Routes of administration: Oral and IM
- Drug class: Typical antipsychotic
- ATC code: N05AB03 (WHO)

Legal status
- Legal status: BR: Class C1 (Other controlled substances); UK: POM (Prescription only); US: ℞-only

Pharmacokinetic data
- Bioavailability: 40%
- Metabolism: hepatic
- Elimination half-life: 8–12 (up to 20) hours

Identifiers
- IUPAC name: 2-[4-[3-(2-chloro-10H-phenothiazin-10-yl) propyl]piperazin-1-yl]ethanol
- CAS Number: 58-39-9
- PubChem CID: 4748
- IUPHAR/BPS: 209
- DrugBank: DB00850
- ChemSpider: 4586
- UNII: FTA7XXY4EZ
- KEGG: D00503
- ChEBI: CHEBI:8028
- ChEMBL: ChEMBL567
- CompTox Dashboard (EPA): DTXSID1023441
- ECHA InfoCard: 100.000.346

Chemical and physical data
- Formula: C_{21}H_{26}ClN_{3}OS
- Molar mass: 403.97 g·mol^{−1}
- 3D model (JSmol): Interactive image
- SMILES: Clc2cc1N(c3c(Sc1cc2)cccc3)CCCN4CCN(CCO)CC4
- InChI: InChI=1S/C21H26ClN3OS/c22-17-6-7-21-19(16-17)25(18-4-1-2-5-20(18)27-21)9-3-8-23-10-12-24(13-11-23)14-15-26/h1-2,4-7,16,26H,3,8-15H2; Key:RGCVKNLCSQQDEP-UHFFFAOYSA-N

Perphenazine is a typical antipsychotic drug. Chemically, it is classified as a piperazinyl phenothiazine. Originally marketed in the United States as Trilafon, it has been in clinical use for decades.

Perphenazine is roughly ten times as potent as chlorpromazine at the dopamine-2 (D2) receptor; thus perphenazine is considered a medium-potency antipsychotic.

== Medical uses ==
In low doses it is used to treat agitated depression (together with an antidepressant). Fixed combinations of perphenazine and the tricyclic antidepressant amitriptyline in different proportions of weight exist (see Etrafon below). When treating depression, perphenazine is discontinued as fast as the clinical situation allows. Perphenazine has no intrinsic antidepressive activity. Several studies show that the use of perphenazine with fluoxetine (Prozac) in patients with psychotic depression is most promising, although fluoxetine interferes with the metabolism of perphenazine, causing higher plasma levels of perphenazine and a longer half-life. In this combination the strong antiemetic action of perphenazine attenuates fluoxetine-induced nausea and vomiting (emesis), as well as the initial agitation caused by fluoxetine. Both actions can be helpful for many patients.

Perphenazine has been used in low doses as a 'normal' or 'minor' tranquilizer in patients with a known history of addiction to drugs or alcohol, a practice which is now strongly discouraged.

Perphenazine has sedating and anxiolytic properties, making the drug useful for the treatment of agitated psychotic patients.

A valuable off-label indication is the short-time treatment of hyperemesis gravidarum, in which pregnant women experience violent nausea and vomiting. This problem can become severe enough to endanger the pregnancy. As perphenazine has not been shown to be teratogenic and works very well, it is sometimes given orally in the smallest possible dose.

=== Effectiveness ===
Perphenazine is used to treat psychosis (e.g. in people with schizophrenia and the manic phases of bipolar disorder and OCD). Perphenazine effectively treats the positive symptoms of schizophrenia, such as hallucinations and delusions, but its effectiveness in treating the negative symptoms of schizophrenia, such as flattened affect and poverty of speech, is unclear. Earlier studies found the typical antipsychotics to be ineffective or poorly effective in the treatment of negative symptoms, but two recent, large-scale studies found no difference between perphenazine and the atypical antipsychotics. A 2015 systematic review compared perphenazine with other antipsychotic drugs:

Perphenazine compared with any antipsychotic drug for schizophrenia
Summary
Although perphenazine has been used in randomized trials for more than 50 years, incomplete reporting and the variety of comparators used make it impossible to draw clear conclusions. All data for the main outcomes were of very low quality evidence. At best it can be said that perphenazine showed similar effects—including adverse events—as several of the other antipsychotic drugs.

Outcome	Findings in words	Findings in numbers	Quality of evidence
Global state
No better or deterioration Follow-up: mean 8 weeks	Perphenazine is not clearly different from other drugs for this global outcome and data supporting this finding are very limited.	RR 1.04 (0.91 to 1.17)	Very low
Mental state
Mental state - 'no effect' (BPRS score reduction); Follow-up: average 8 weeks	At present it is not possible to be confident about the difference between perphenazine and any other antipsychotic drug. Data supporting this finding are very limited.	RR 1.24 (0.61 to 2.52)	Very low
Adverse events
Extrapyramidal adverse effects - dystonia Follow-up: average 10 weeks	Perphenazine is not clearly different to other antipsychotic drugs and data supporting this finding are very limited.	RR 1.36 (0.23 to 8.16)	Very low
Any serious adverse event Follow-up: average 39 weeks	It is also not possible to be confident about the difference between the two treatments. Data supporting this finding are very limited.	RR 0.98 (0.68 to 1.41)	Very low
	No study reported any data on outcomes such as death, economic outcomes and information relating to time in services		

== Side effects ==
As a member of the phenothiazine type of antipsychotics, perphenazine shares in general all allergic and toxic side-effects of chlorpromazine. A 2015 systematic review of the data on perphenazine conducted by the Cochrane Collaboration concluded that "there were no convincing differences between perphenazine and other antipsychotics" in the incidence of adverse effects. Perphenazine causes early and late extrapyramidal side effects more often than placebo, and at a similar rate to other medium-potency antipsychotics and the atypical antipsychotic risperidone.

When used for its strong antiemetic or antivertignosic effects in cases with associated brain injuries, it may obscure the clinical course and interferes with the diagnosis. High doses of perphenazine can cause temporary dyskinesia. As with other typical antipsychotics, permanent or lasting tardive dyskinesia is a risk.

=== Discontinuation ===
The British National Formulary recommends a gradual withdrawal when discontinuing antipsychotics to avoid acute withdrawal syndrome or rapid relapse. Symptoms of withdrawal commonly include nausea, vomiting, and loss of appetite. Other symptoms may include restlessness, increased sweating, and trouble sleeping. Less commonly there may be a feeling of the world spinning, numbness, or muscle pains. Symptoms generally resolve after a short period of time.

There is tentative evidence that discontinuation of antipsychotics can result in psychosis. It may also result in reoccurrence of the condition that is being treated. Rarely tardive dyskinesia can occur when the medication is stopped.

== Pharmacology ==
=== Pharmacodynamics ===
Perphenazine has the following binding profile towards cloned human receptors unless otherwise specified:

Molecular target	Binding affinity (K_{i}[nM]) for perphenazine	Binding affinity (K_{i}[nM]) for dealkylperphenazine	Binding affinity (K_{i}[nM]) for 7-hydroxyperphenazine
5-HT_{1A}	421	-	-
5-HT_{2A}	5.6	54	38
5-HT_{2C}	132	-	-
5-HT_{6}	17	-	-
5-HT_{7}	23	-	-
α_{1A}	10	-	-
α_{2A}	810	-	-
α_{2B}	104.9	-	-
α_{2C}	85.2	-	-
M_{1}	2000	130	3400
M_{3}	1848	-	-
D_{1}	29.9 (RS)	-	-
D_{2}	0.765	-	-
D_{2L} receptor	3.4	85	4.1
D_{3}	0.13	-	-
D_{4}	17	-	-
D_{4.4} receptor	140	690	620
H_{1}	8	-	-
σ	18.5 (RB)	-	-

Acronyms:
RS — Rat striatum receptor.
RB — Rat brain receptor.

Mechanisms

Perphenazine is a typical antipsychotic medication of midrange or moderate potency (the 15-fold of a chlorpromazine dosage, also a typical antipsychotic medication). Compared with the high potent typical antipsychotic drug haloperidol (50-fold), it despite is considered by some to have similar extrapyramidal side-effects. This is probably because it has similar affinity values at the D2/3 receptors (0.7, 0.3). Compared to other substance types of antipsychotics of the phenothiazine family, perphenazine does have comparable greater behavioral effects in respective to its antipsychotic potency (compared to other phenothiazines), so it could be considered to be favorable or efficient as add-on if the adherence of the patient to the daily clinical life is somehow too missing or not really sufficient.

There exists a distinction to separate the type an antipsychotic is blocking into pure (silent) antagonists and inverse agonists (but with both, antagonists and inverse agonists inducing the same therapeutic effect, in case of antipsychotics) where it seems to tend out that inverse agonists at least occurs very often at exactly this from a specific neuroleptic's bindingsite which is weightened the most potent and therapeutic effect initiating bindingsite of each neuroleptic's individuall affinityprofile (e.g. 5HT2A in Clo- and Olanzapine, H1 in Olanzapine, D2 in Haloperidole). Perphenazine here makes an exception being a normal antagonist in its most important bindingsite (D2).

Like other phenothiazine derivatives, it also inhibits tubulin polymerization.

=== Pharmacokinetics ===
Perphenazine has an oral bioavailability of approximately 40% and a half-life of 8 to 12 hours (up to 20 hours), and is usually given in 2 or 3 divided doses each day. It is possible to give two-thirds of the daily dose at bedtime and one-third during breakfast to maximize hypnotic activity during the night and to minimize daytime sedation and hypotension without loss of therapeutic activity.

Pharmacokinetics of long-acting injectable antipsychotics
Medication	Brand name	Class	Vehicle	Dosage	T_{max}	t_{1/2} single	t_{1/2} multiple	logP^{c}	Ref
Aripiprazole lauroxil	Aristada	Atypical	Water^{a}	441–1064 mg/4–8 weeks	24–35 days	?	54–57 days	7.9–10.0	
Aripiprazole monohydrate	Abilify Maintena	Atypical	Water^{a}	300–400 mg/4 weeks	7 days	?	30–47 days	4.9–5.2	
Bromperidol decanoate	Impromen Decanoas	Typical	Sesame oil	40–300 mg/4 weeks	3–9 days	?	21–25 days	7.9	
Clopentixol decanoate	Sordinol Depot	Typical	Viscoleo^{b}	50–600 mg/1–4 weeks	4–7 days	?	19 days	9.0	
Flupentixol decanoate	Depixol	Typical	Viscoleo^{b}	10–200 mg/2–4 weeks	4–10 days	8 days	17 days	7.2–9.2	
Fluphenazine decanoate	Prolixin Decanoate	Typical	Sesame oil	12.5–100 mg/2–5 weeks	1–2 days	1–10 days	14–100 days	7.2–9.0	
Fluphenazine enanthate	Prolixin Enanthate	Typical	Sesame oil	12.5–100 mg/1–4 weeks	2–3 days	4 days	?	6.4–7.4	
Fluspirilene	Imap, Redeptin	Typical	Water^{a}	2–12 mg/1 week	1–8 days	7 days	?	5.2–5.8	
Haloperidol decanoate	Haldol Decanoate	Typical	Sesame oil	20–400 mg/2–4 weeks	3–9 days	18–21 days		7.2–7.9	
Olanzapine pamoate	Zyprexa Relprevv	Atypical	Water^{a}	150–405 mg/2–4 weeks	7 days	?	30 days	–	
Oxyprothepin decanoate	Meclopin	Typical	?	?	?	?	?	8.5–8.7	
Paliperidone palmitate	Invega Sustenna	Atypical	Water^{a}	39–819 mg/4–12 weeks	13–33 days	25–139 days	?	8.1–10.1	
Perphenazine decanoate	Trilafon Dekanoat	Typical	Sesame oil	50–200 mg/2–4 weeks	?	?	27 days	8.9	
Perphenazine enanthate	Trilafon Enanthate	Typical	Sesame oil	25–200 mg/2 weeks	2–3 days	?	4–7 days	6.4–7.2	
Pipotiazine palmitate	Piportil Longum	Typical	Viscoleo^{b}	25–400 mg/4 weeks	9–10 days	?	14–21 days	8.5–11.6	
Pipotiazine undecylenate	Piportil Medium	Typical	Sesame oil	100–200 mg/2 weeks	?	?	?	8.4	
Risperidone	Risperdal Consta	Atypical	Microspheres	12.5–75 mg/2 weeks	21 days	?	3–6 days	–	
Zuclopentixol acetate	Clopixol Acuphase	Typical	Viscoleo^{b}	50–200 mg/1–3 days	1–2 days	1–2 days		4.7–4.9	
Zuclopentixol decanoate	Clopixol Depot	Typical	Viscoleo^{b}	50–800 mg/2–4 weeks	4–9 days	?	11–21 days	7.5–9.0	
Note: All by intramuscular injection. Footnotes: ^{a} = Microcrystalline or nanocrystalline aqueous suspension. ^{b} = Low-viscosity vegetable oil (specifically fractionated coconut oil with medium-chain triglycerides). ^{c} = Predicted, from PubChem and DrugBank. Sources: Main: See template.

== Formulations ==
It is sold under the brand names Trilafon (single drug) and Etrafon/Triavil/Triptafen (contains fixed dosages of amitriptyline). A brand name in Europe is Decentan pointing to the fact that perphenazine is approximately 10-times more potent than chlorpromazine. Usual oral forms are tablets (2, 4, 8, 16 mg) and liquid concentrate (4 mg/ml).

The 'Perphenazine injectable USP' solution is intended for deep intramuscular (i.m.) injection, for patients who are not willing to take oral medication or if the patient is unable to swallow. Due to a better bioavailability of the injection, two-thirds of the original oral dose is sufficient. The incidence of hypotension, sedation and extrapyramidal side-effects may be higher compared to oral treatment. The i.m.-injections are appropriate for a few days, but oral treatment should start as soon as possible.

In many countries, depot forms of perphenazine exist (as perphenazine enanthate and perphenazine decanoate). One injection works for 1 to 4 weeks depending on the dose of the depot-injection. Depot-forms of perphenazine should not be used during the initial phase of treatment as the rare neuroleptic malignant syndrome may become more severe and uncontrollable with this form. Extrapyramidal side-effects may be somewhat reduced due to constant plasma-levels during depot-therapy. Also, patient compliance is sure, as many patients do not take their oral medication, particularly if feeling better once improvement in psychosis is achieved.

== Interactions ==
Fluoxetine causes higher plasma levels and a longer elimination half-life of perphenazine, therefore a dose reduction of perphenazine might be necessary.

Perphenazine intensifies the central depressive action of drugs with such activity (tranquilizers, hypnotics, narcotics, antihistaminics, OTC-antiemetics etc.). A dose reduction of perphenazine or the other drug may be necessary.

In general, all neuroleptics may lead to seizures in combination with the opioid tramadol (Ultram).

Perphenazine may increase the insulin needs of diabetic patients. Monitor blood glucose levels of insulin-dependent patients regularly during long-term treatment.
