= Flupentixol =

Typical antipsychotic drug of the thioxanthene class

Clinical data
- Trade names: Depixol, Fluanxol
- AHFS/Drugs.com: Micromedex Detailed Consumer Information
- Pregnancy category: AU: C
- Routes of administration: Oral, IM (including a depot)
- Drug class: Typical antipsychotic
- ATC code: N05AF01 (WHO)

Legal status
- Legal status: AU: S4 (Prescription only); BR: Class C1 (Other controlled substances); CA: ℞-only; UK: POM (Prescription only); In general: ℞ (Prescription only)

Pharmacokinetic data
- Bioavailability: 40–55% (oral)
- Metabolism: Gut wall, hepatic
- Elimination half-life: 35 hours
- Excretion: Renal (negligible)

Identifiers
- IUPAC name: (EZ)-2-[4-[3-[2-(trifluoromethyl)thioxanthen-9-ylidene]propyl]piperazin-1-yl]ethanol
- CAS Number: 2709-56-0
- PubChem CID: 5281881
- IUPHAR/BPS: 968
- DrugBank: DB00875
- ChemSpider: 4445173
- UNII: 21HMQ851IS
- KEGG: D01044
- ChEMBL: ChEMBL42055
- CompTox Dashboard (EPA): DTXSID3058749
- ECHA InfoCard: 100.018.459

Chemical and physical data
- Formula: C_{23}H_{25}F_{3}N_{2}OS
- Molar mass: 434.52 g·mol^{−1}
- 3D model (JSmol): Interactive image
- SMILES: FC(F)(F)c2cc1C(\c3c(Sc1cc2)cccc3)=C/CCN4CCN(CCO)CC4
- InChI: InChI=1S/C23H25F3N2OS/c24-23(25,26)17-7-8-22-20(16-17)18(19-4-1-2-6-21(19)30-22)5-3-9-27-10-12-28(13-11-27)14-15-29/h1-2,4-8,16,29H,3,9-15H2/b18-5-; Key:NJMYODHXAKYRHW-DVZOWYKESA-N

Flupentixol (INN), also known as flupenthixol (former BAN), marketed under brand names such as Depixol and Fluanxol is a typical antipsychotic drug of the thioxanthene class. It was introduced in 1965 by Lundbeck. In addition to single drug preparations, it is also available as flupentixol/melitracen—a combination product containing both melitracen (a tricyclic antidepressant) and flupentixol (marketed as Deanxit). It is approved for use in the UK, Australia, Canada, Russian Federation, South Africa, New Zealand, Philippines, Iran, Germany, among others. Flupentixol is not approved for use in the United States.

== Medical uses ==
Flupentixol's main use is as a long-acting injection given once in every two or three weeks to individuals with schizophrenia who have poor compliance with medication and have frequent relapses of illness, though it is also commonly given as a tablet. There is little formal evidence to support its use for this indication but it has been in use for over fifty years.

Flupentixol is also used in low doses as an antidepressant. There is tentative evidence that it reduces the rate of deliberate self-harm, among those who self-harm repeatedly.

== Adverse effects ==
Adverse effect incidence

Common (>1% incidence) adverse effects include

- Extrapyramidal side effects such as: (which usually become apparent soon after therapy is begun or soon after an increase in dose is made)
  - Muscle rigidity
  - Hypokinesia
  - Hyperkinesia
  - Parkinsonism
  - Tremor
  - Akathisia
  - Dystonia
- Dry mouth
- Constipation
- Hypersalivation – excessive salivation
- Blurred vision
- Diaphoresis – excessive sweating
- Nausea
- Dizziness
- Somnolence
- Restlessness
- Insomnia
- Overactivity
- Headache
- Nervousness
- Fatigue
- Myalgia
- Hyperprolactinemia and its complications such as: (acutely)
  - Sexual dysfunction
  - Amenorrhea – cessation of menstrual cycles
  - Gynecomastia – enlargement of breast tissue in males
  - Galactorrhea – the expulsion of breast milk that's not related to breastfeeding or pregnancy

and if the hyperprolactinemia persists chronically, the following adverse effects may be seen:
- Reduced bone mineral density leading to osteoporosis (brittle bones)
- Infertility

- Dyspepsia – indigestion
- Abdominal pain
- Flatulence
- Nasal congestion
- Polyuria – passing more urine than usual

Uncommon (0.1–1% incidence) adverse effects include

- Fainting
- Palpitations

Rare (<0.1% incidence) adverse effects include

- Blood dyscrasias (abnormalities in the cell composition of blood), such as:
  - Agranulocytosis – a drop in white blood cell counts that leaves one open to potentially life-threatening infections
  - Neutropenia – a drop in the number of neutrophils (white blood cells that specifically fight bacteria) in one's blood
  - Leucopenia – a less severe drop in white blood cell counts than agranulocytosis
  - Thrombocytopenia – a drop in the number of platelets in the blood. Platelets are responsible for blood clotting and hence this leads to an increased risk of bruising and other bleeds
- Neuroleptic malignant syndrome – a potentially fatal condition that appear to result from central D_{2} receptor blockade. The symptoms include:
  - Hyperthermia
  - Muscle rigidity
  - Rhabdomyolysis
  - Autonomic instability (e.g., tachycardia, diarrhea, diaphoresis, etc.)
  - Mental status changes (e.g., coma, agitation, anxiety, confusion, etc.)

Unknown incidence adverse effects include

- Jaundice
- Abnormal liver function test results
- Tardive dyskinesia – an often incurable movement disorder that usually results from years of continuous treatment with antipsychotic drugs, especially typical antipsychotics like flupenthixol. It presents with repetitive, involuntary, purposeless and slow movements; TD can be triggered by a fast dose reduction in any antipsychotic.
- Hypotension
- Confusional state
- Seizures
- Mania
- Hypomania
- Depression
- Hot flush
- Anergia
- Appetite changes
- Weight changes
- Hyperglycemia – high blood glucose (sugar) levels
- Abnormal glucose tolerance
- Pruritus – itchiness
- Rash
- Dermatitis
- Photosensitivity – sensitivity to light
- Oculogyric crisis
- Accommodation disorder
- Sleep disorder
- Impaired concentration
- Tachycardia
- QTc interval prolongation – an abnormality in the electrical activity of the heart that can lead to potentially fatal changes in heart rhythm (only in overdose or <10 ms increases in QTc)
- Torsades de pointes
- Miosis – constriction of the pupil of the eye
- Paralytic ileus – paralysis of the bowel muscles leading to severe constipation, inability to pass wind, etc.
- Mydriasis
- Glaucoma

=== Interactions ===
It should not be used concomitantly with medications known to prolong the QTc interval (e.g., 5-HT3 antagonists, tricyclic antidepressants, citalopram, etc.) as this may lead to an increased risk of QTc interval prolongation. Neither should it be given concurrently with lithium (medication) as it may increase the risk of lithium toxicity and neuroleptic malignant syndrome. It should not be given concurrently with other antipsychotics due to the potential for this to increase the risk of side effects, especially neurological side effects such as neuroleptic malignant syndrome. It should be avoided in patients on CNS depressants such as opioids, alcohol and barbiturates.

=== Contraindications ===
It should not be given in the following disease states:

- Pheochromocytoma
- Prolactin-dependent tumors such as pituitary prolactinomas and breast cancer
- Long QT syndrome
- Coma
- Circulatory collapse
- Subcortical brain damage
- Blood dyscrasia
- Parkinson's disease
- Dementia with Lewy bodies

== Pharmacology ==
=== Pharmacodynamics ===
Binding profile

Protein	cis-flupentixol	trans-flupentixol
5-HT_{1A}	8028	—
5-HT_{2A}	87.5 (HFC)	—
5-HT_{2C}	102.2 (RC)	—
mAChRs	Neg.	Neg.
D_{1}	3.5	474 (MB)
D_{2}	0.35	120
D_{3}	1.75	162.5
D_{4}	66.3	>1000
H_{1}	0.86	5.73

Acronyms used:
HFC – Human frontal cortex receptor
MB – Mouse brain receptor
RC – Cloned rat receptor

A study measuring the in vivo receptor occupancies of 13 schizophrenic patients treated with 5.7 ± 1.4 mg/day of flupentixol found 50-70% receptor occupancy for D2, 20 ± 5% for D1, and 20 ± 10% for 5-HT2A.

Its antipsychotic effects are predominantly a function of D_{2} antagonism.

Its antidepressant effects at lower doses are not well understood; however, it may be mediated by functional selectivity and/or preferentially binding to D_{2} autoreceptors at low doses, resulting in increased postsynaptic activation via higher dopamine levels. Flupentixol's demonstrated ability to raise dopamine levels in mice and flies lends credibility to the supposition of autoreceptor bias. Functional selectivity may be responsible through causing preferential autoreceptor binding or other means. The effective dosage guideline for an antipsychotic is very closely related to its receptor residency time (i.e., where drugs like aripiprazole take several minutes or more to disassociate from a receptor while drugs like quetiapine and clozapine—with guideline dosages in the hundreds of milligrams—take under 30s) and long receptor residency time is strongly correlated with likehood of pronounced functional selectivity; thus, with a maximum guideline dose of only 18 mg/day for schizophrenia, there is a significant possibility of this drug possessing unique signalling characteristics that permit counterintuitive dopaminergic action at low doses.

Flupentixol also inhibits tubulin polymerization.

=== Pharmacokinetics ===
Pharmacokinetics of long-acting injectable antipsychotics
Medication	Brand name	Class	Vehicle	Dosage	T_{max}	t_{1/2} single	t_{1/2} multiple	logP^{c}	Ref
Aripiprazole lauroxil	Aristada	Atypical	Water^{a}	441–1064 mg/4–8 weeks	24–35 days	?	54–57 days	7.9–10.0	
Aripiprazole monohydrate	Abilify Maintena	Atypical	Water^{a}	300–400 mg/4 weeks	7 days	?	30–47 days	4.9–5.2	
Bromperidol decanoate	Impromen Decanoas	Typical	Sesame oil	40–300 mg/4 weeks	3–9 days	?	21–25 days	7.9	
Clopentixol decanoate	Sordinol Depot	Typical	Viscoleo^{b}	50–600 mg/1–4 weeks	4–7 days	?	19 days	9.0	
Flupentixol decanoate	Depixol	Typical	Viscoleo^{b}	10–200 mg/2–4 weeks	4–10 days	8 days	17 days	7.2–9.2	
Fluphenazine decanoate	Prolixin Decanoate	Typical	Sesame oil	12.5–100 mg/2–5 weeks	1–2 days	1–10 days	14–100 days	7.2–9.0	
Fluphenazine enanthate	Prolixin Enanthate	Typical	Sesame oil	12.5–100 mg/1–4 weeks	2–3 days	4 days	?	6.4–7.4	
Fluspirilene	Imap, Redeptin	Typical	Water^{a}	2–12 mg/1 week	1–8 days	7 days	?	5.2–5.8	
Haloperidol decanoate	Haldol Decanoate	Typical	Sesame oil	20–400 mg/2–4 weeks	3–9 days	18–21 days		7.2–7.9	
Olanzapine pamoate	Zyprexa Relprevv	Atypical	Water^{a}	150–405 mg/2–4 weeks	7 days	?	30 days	–	
Oxyprothepin decanoate	Meclopin	Typical	?	?	?	?	?	8.5–8.7	
Paliperidone palmitate	Invega Sustenna	Atypical	Water^{a}	39–819 mg/4–12 weeks	13–33 days	25–139 days	?	8.1–10.1	
Perphenazine decanoate	Trilafon Dekanoat	Typical	Sesame oil	50–200 mg/2–4 weeks	?	?	27 days	8.9	
Perphenazine enanthate	Trilafon Enanthate	Typical	Sesame oil	25–200 mg/2 weeks	2–3 days	?	4–7 days	6.4–7.2	
Pipotiazine palmitate	Piportil Longum	Typical	Viscoleo^{b}	25–400 mg/4 weeks	9–10 days	?	14–21 days	8.5–11.6	
Pipotiazine undecylenate	Piportil Medium	Typical	Sesame oil	100–200 mg/2 weeks	?	?	?	8.4	
Risperidone	Risperdal Consta	Atypical	Microspheres	12.5–75 mg/2 weeks	21 days	?	3–6 days	–	
Zuclopentixol acetate	Clopixol Acuphase	Typical	Viscoleo^{b}	50–200 mg/1–3 days	1–2 days	1–2 days		4.7–4.9	
Zuclopentixol decanoate	Clopixol Depot	Typical	Viscoleo^{b}	50–800 mg/2–4 weeks	4–9 days	?	11–21 days	7.5–9.0	
Note: All by intramuscular injection. Footnotes: ^{a} = Microcrystalline or nanocrystalline aqueous suspension. ^{b} = Low-viscosity vegetable oil (specifically fractionated coconut oil with medium-chain triglycerides). ^{c} = Predicted, from PubChem and DrugBank. Sources: Main: See template.

== History ==
In March 1963 the Danish pharmaceutical company Lundbeck began research into further agents for schizophrenia, having already developed the thioxanthene derivatives clopenthixol and chlorprothixene. By 1965 the promising agent flupenthixol had been developed and trialled in two hospitals in Vienna by Austrian psychiatrist Heinrich Gross. The long- acting decanoate preparation was synthesised in 1967 and introduced into hospital practice in Sweden in 1968, with a reduction in relapses among patients who were put on the depot.
