= Bromidol =

Bromidol has been used to refer to two quite different drugs;

- An official trade name for the antipsychotic drug bromperidol
- A slang name for a potent opioid drug, BDPC
