= Pipotiazine =

Typical antipsychotic medication

Clinical data
- Trade names: Piportil
- AHFS/Drugs.com: International Drug Names
- Routes of administration: Oral, IM
- ATC code: N05AC04 (WHO)

Legal status
- Legal status: BR: Class C1 (Other controlled substances); In general: ℞ (Prescription only)

Identifiers
- IUPAC name: 10-[3-[4-(2-hydroxyethyl)-1-piperidyl]propyl]-N,N-dimethyl-phenothiazine-2-sulfonamide
- CAS Number: 39860-99-6
- PubChem CID: 62867
- IUPHAR/BPS: 7557
- DrugBank: DB01621
- ChemSpider: 56598
- UNII: L903J9JPYV
- KEGG: D08385
- ChEMBL: ChEMBL398880
- CompTox Dashboard (EPA): DTXSID40192913
- ECHA InfoCard: 100.049.672

Chemical and physical data
- Formula: C_{24}H_{33}N_{3}O_{3}S_{2}
- Molar mass: 475.67 g·mol^{−1}
- 3D model (JSmol): Interactive image
- SMILES: CN(C)S(=O)(=O)C1=CC2=C(C=C1)SC3=CC=CC=C3N2CCCN4CCC(CC4)CCO

Pipotiazine (Piportil), also known as pipothiazine, is a typical antipsychotic of the phenothiazine class used in the United Kingdom and other countries for the treatment of schizophrenia. Its properties are similar to those of chlorpromazine. A 2004 systematic review investigated its efficacy for people with schizophrenia:

Pipotiazine palmitate compared to oral antipsychotics for schizophrenia
Summary
Although well-conducted and reported randomized trials are still needed to fully inform practice (no trial data exists reporting hospital and services outcomes, quality of life, satisfaction with care and economics) pipotiazine palmitate is a viable choice for both clinician and person with schizophrenia.

Outcome	Findings in words	Findings in numbers	Quality of evidence
Global outcomes
No important clinical response Follow-up: by 3 week)	There is no clear difference between people given pipotiazine palmitate and those receiving oral antipsychotics. These findings are based on data of low quality.	RR 2.57 (0.76 to 8.63)	Low
Leaving the study early Follow-up: up to 5 weeks	Pipotiazine palmitate may increase the chance of leaving the study early but the difference between people given pipotiazine palmitate and those receiving oral antipsychotics is not clear. These findings are based on data of low quality.	RR 3.85 (0.46 to 32.22)	Low
Mental state
Relapse; Follow-up: by 18 months)	Pipotiazine palmitate has not more - or less - effect on risk of relapse than oral antipsychotics. These findings are based on data of low quality.	RR 1.55 (0.76 to 3.18)	Low
Adverse effects
Tardive dyskinesia	Oral antipsychotic drugs and pipotiazine palmitate carry similar risks of this problematic movement disorder. These findings are based on data of low quality.	RR 1.03 (0.22 to 4.92)	Low
Dystonia	Pipotiazine palmitate may slightly reduce the chance of experiencing this movement disorder but there is no clear difference between people given pipotiazine palmitate and those receiving oral antipsychotics. These findings are based on data of low quality.	RR 0.32 (0.04 to 2.89)	Low

Pharmacokinetics of long-acting injectable antipsychotics
Medication	Brand name	Class	Vehicle	Dosage	T_{max}	t_{1/2} single	t_{1/2} multiple	logP^{c}	Ref
Aripiprazole lauroxil	Aristada	Atypical	Water^{a}	441–1064 mg/4–8 weeks	24–35 days	?	54–57 days	7.9–10.0	
Aripiprazole monohydrate	Abilify Maintena	Atypical	Water^{a}	300–400 mg/4 weeks	7 days	?	30–47 days	4.9–5.2	
Bromperidol decanoate	Impromen Decanoas	Typical	Sesame oil	40–300 mg/4 weeks	3–9 days	?	21–25 days	7.9	
Clopentixol decanoate	Sordinol Depot	Typical	Viscoleo^{b}	50–600 mg/1–4 weeks	4–7 days	?	19 days	9.0	
Flupentixol decanoate	Depixol	Typical	Viscoleo^{b}	10–200 mg/2–4 weeks	4–10 days	8 days	17 days	7.2–9.2	
Fluphenazine decanoate	Prolixin Decanoate	Typical	Sesame oil	12.5–100 mg/2–5 weeks	1–2 days	1–10 days	14–100 days	7.2–9.0	
Fluphenazine enanthate	Prolixin Enanthate	Typical	Sesame oil	12.5–100 mg/1–4 weeks	2–3 days	4 days	?	6.4–7.4	
Fluspirilene	Imap, Redeptin	Typical	Water^{a}	2–12 mg/1 week	1–8 days	7 days	?	5.2–5.8	
Haloperidol decanoate	Haldol Decanoate	Typical	Sesame oil	20–400 mg/2–4 weeks	3–9 days	18–21 days		7.2–7.9	
Olanzapine pamoate	Zyprexa Relprevv	Atypical	Water^{a}	150–405 mg/2–4 weeks	7 days	?	30 days	–	
Oxyprothepin decanoate	Meclopin	Typical	?	?	?	?	?	8.5–8.7	
Paliperidone palmitate	Invega Sustenna	Atypical	Water^{a}	39–819 mg/4–12 weeks	13–33 days	25–139 days	?	8.1–10.1	
Perphenazine decanoate	Trilafon Dekanoat	Typical	Sesame oil	50–200 mg/2–4 weeks	?	?	27 days	8.9	
Perphenazine enanthate	Trilafon Enanthate	Typical	Sesame oil	25–200 mg/2 weeks	2–3 days	?	4–7 days	6.4–7.2	
Pipotiazine palmitate	Piportil Longum	Typical	Viscoleo^{b}	25–400 mg/4 weeks	9–10 days	?	14–21 days	8.5–11.6	
Pipotiazine undecylenate	Piportil Medium	Typical	Sesame oil	100–200 mg/2 weeks	?	?	?	8.4	
Risperidone	Risperdal Consta	Atypical	Microspheres	12.5–75 mg/2 weeks	21 days	?	3–6 days	–	
Zuclopentixol acetate	Clopixol Acuphase	Typical	Viscoleo^{b}	50–200 mg/1–3 days	1–2 days	1–2 days		4.7–4.9	
Zuclopentixol decanoate	Clopixol Depot	Typical	Viscoleo^{b}	50–800 mg/2–4 weeks	4–9 days	?	11–21 days	7.5–9.0	
Note: All by intramuscular injection. Footnotes: ^{a} = Microcrystalline or nanocrystalline aqueous suspension. ^{b} = Low-viscosity vegetable oil (specifically fractionated coconut oil with medium-chain triglycerides). ^{c} = Predicted, from PubChem and DrugBank. Sources: Main: See template.

== Medical uses ==
Pipotiazine palmitate is used to treat schizophrenia.

== Contraindications ==
Pipotiazine palmitate is contraindicated in people with circulatory collapse (shock), altered states of consciousness, including drug intoxication, or other serious health conditions (liver disease, kidney disease, pheochromocytoma, severe cardiovascular disease, or blood dyscrasias). It is contraindicated in people with severe depression. Pipotiazine palmitate should not be used in people who have a history of allergic reactions to any component of the medicine or to chemically similar medicines (phenothiazines).

== Pharmacokinetics ==
Pipotiazine was available as a long-acting injectable formulation (pipotiazine palmitate). After deep intramuscular injection, pipotiazine palmitate reaches maximum plasma concentration in 7-14 days, has an elimination half-life of 15 days, and reaches steady-state levels after 2 months of usual dosing (given every 4 weeks).

== Synthesis ==
Synthesis of pipotiazine has been reported.

Synthesis of pipotiazine

The alkylation of 2-dimethylaminosulfonylphenthiazine (1) with 1-bromo-3-chloropropane (2) gives 10-(3-chloropropyl)-N,N-dimethylphenothiazine-2-sulfonamide (3). Alkylation with 4-piperidineethanol (4) completes the synthesis of pipothiazine (5).

== History ==
The long-acting injectable formulation of pipotiazine (pipotiazine palmitate) was withdrawn from all markets globally in March 2015 due to a shortage of the active ingredient.
