= Imap =

IMAP or Imap may refer to:

- Internet Message Access Protocol, an Internet standard protocol used by email clients
- Interstellar Mapping and Acceleration Probe, a NASA spacecraft mission to study the boundary of the heliosphere
- Imap, an antipsychotic, see Fluspirilene
