= Haloperidol decanoate =

Typical antipsychotic medication

Clinical data
- Trade names: Halomonth, Haldol Decanoate, Haldol Decanoas, Haloperidol Decanoate, Haloperidol Decanoat, Neoperidole, Serenase Dekanoat
- Other names: KD-136; R-13672
- Routes of administration: Intramuscular injection
- Drug class: Typical antipsychotic

Legal status
- Legal status: US: ℞-only

Identifiers
- IUPAC name: [4-(4-chlorophenyl)-1-[4-(4-fluorophenyl)-4-oxobutyl]piperidin-4-yl] decanoate
- CAS Number: 74050-97-8 77129-05-6
- PubChem CID: 52919
- DrugBank: DBSALT001195
- ChemSpider: 47814
- UNII: AC20PJ4101
- KEGG: D01898
- ChEBI: CHEBI:31664
- ChEMBL: ChEMBL1200986
- CompTox Dashboard (EPA): DTXSID50224951
- ECHA InfoCard: 100.070.597

Chemical and physical data
- Formula: C_{31}H_{41}ClFNO_{3}
- Molar mass: 530.12 g·mol^{−1}
- 3D model (JSmol): Interactive image
- SMILES: CCCCCCCCCC(=O)OC1(CCN(CC1)CCCC(=O)C2=CC=C(C=C2)F)C3=CC=C(C=C3)Cl
- InChI: InChI=1S/C31H41ClFNO3/c1-2-3-4-5-6-7-8-11-30(36)37-31(26-14-16-27(32)17-15-26)20-23-34(24-21-31)22-9-10-29(35)25-12-18-28(33)19-13-25/h12-19H,2-11,20-24H2,1H3; Key:GUTXTARXLVFHDK-UHFFFAOYSA-N

Haloperidol decanoate, sold under the brand name Haldol Decanoate among others, is a typical antipsychotic which is used in the treatment of schizophrenia. It is administered by injection into muscle at a dose of 100 to 200 mg once every 4 weeks or monthly. The dorsogluteal site is recommended. A 3.75-cm (1.5-inch), 21-gauge needle is generally used, but obese individuals may require a 6.5-cm (2.5-inch) needle to ensure that the drug is indeed injected intramuscularly and not subcutaneously. Haloperidol decanoate is provided in the form of 50 or 100 mg/mL oil solution of sesame oil and benzyl alcohol in ampoules or pre-filled syringes. Its elimination half-life after multiple doses is 21 days. The medication is marketed in many countries throughout the world.

Pharmacokinetics of long-acting injectable antipsychotics
Medication	Brand name	Class	Vehicle	Dosage	T_{max}	t_{1/2} single	t_{1/2} multiple	logP^{c}	Ref
Aripiprazole lauroxil	Aristada	Atypical	Water^{a}	441–1064 mg/4–8 weeks	24–35 days	?	54–57 days	7.9–10.0	
Aripiprazole monohydrate	Abilify Maintena	Atypical	Water^{a}	300–400 mg/4 weeks	7 days	?	30–47 days	4.9–5.2	
Bromperidol decanoate	Impromen Decanoas	Typical	Sesame oil	40–300 mg/4 weeks	3–9 days	?	21–25 days	7.9	
Clopentixol decanoate	Sordinol Depot	Typical	Viscoleo^{b}	50–600 mg/1–4 weeks	4–7 days	?	19 days	9.0	
Flupentixol decanoate	Depixol	Typical	Viscoleo^{b}	10–200 mg/2–4 weeks	4–10 days	8 days	17 days	7.2–9.2	
Fluphenazine decanoate	Prolixin Decanoate	Typical	Sesame oil	12.5–100 mg/2–5 weeks	1–2 days	1–10 days	14–100 days	7.2–9.0	
Fluphenazine enanthate	Prolixin Enanthate	Typical	Sesame oil	12.5–100 mg/1–4 weeks	2–3 days	4 days	?	6.4–7.4	
Fluspirilene	Imap, Redeptin	Typical	Water^{a}	2–12 mg/1 week	1–8 days	7 days	?	5.2–5.8	
Haloperidol decanoate	Haldol Decanoate	Typical	Sesame oil	20–400 mg/2–4 weeks	3–9 days	18–21 days		7.2–7.9	
Olanzapine pamoate	Zyprexa Relprevv	Atypical	Water^{a}	150–405 mg/2–4 weeks	7 days	?	30 days	–	
Oxyprothepin decanoate	Meclopin	Typical	?	?	?	?	?	8.5–8.7	
Paliperidone palmitate	Invega Sustenna	Atypical	Water^{a}	39–819 mg/4–12 weeks	13–33 days	25–139 days	?	8.1–10.1	
Perphenazine decanoate	Trilafon Dekanoat	Typical	Sesame oil	50–200 mg/2–4 weeks	?	?	27 days	8.9	
Perphenazine enanthate	Trilafon Enanthate	Typical	Sesame oil	25–200 mg/2 weeks	2–3 days	?	4–7 days	6.4–7.2	
Pipotiazine palmitate	Piportil Longum	Typical	Viscoleo^{b}	25–400 mg/4 weeks	9–10 days	?	14–21 days	8.5–11.6	
Pipotiazine undecylenate	Piportil Medium	Typical	Sesame oil	100–200 mg/2 weeks	?	?	?	8.4	
Risperidone	Risperdal Consta	Atypical	Microspheres	12.5–75 mg/2 weeks	21 days	?	3–6 days	–	
Zuclopentixol acetate	Clopixol Acuphase	Typical	Viscoleo^{b}	50–200 mg/1–3 days	1–2 days	1–2 days		4.7–4.9	
Zuclopentixol decanoate	Clopixol Depot	Typical	Viscoleo^{b}	50–800 mg/2–4 weeks	4–9 days	?	11–21 days	7.5–9.0	
Note: All by intramuscular injection. Footnotes: ^{a} = Microcrystalline or nanocrystalline aqueous suspension. ^{b} = Low-viscosity vegetable oil (specifically fractionated coconut oil with medium-chain triglycerides). ^{c} = Predicted, from PubChem and DrugBank. Sources: Main: See template.

== See also ==
- List of antipsychotics § Antipsychotic esters
