= IMAP (disambiguation) =

IMAP is an application layer protocol for e-mail retrieval and storage.

It may also refer to:

- Interstellar Mapping and Acceleration Probe, a NASA spacecraft
- Imap (drug), tradename of the fluspirilene antipsychotic
