= Zuclopenthixol =

Typical antipsychotic medication

- Skeletal formula of zuclopenthixol

- Ball-and-stick model of zuclopenthixol

Clinical data
- Trade names: Clopixol
- AHFS/Drugs.com: International Drug Names
- Pregnancy category: AU: C
- Routes of administration: Oral, IM
- Drug class: Typical antipsychotic
- ATC code: N05AF05 (WHO)

Legal status
- Legal status: AU: S4 (Prescription only); BR: Class C1 (Other controlled substances); UK: POM (Prescription only); In general: ℞ (Prescription only)

Pharmacokinetic data
- Bioavailability: 49% (oral)
- Protein binding: 98%
- Metabolism: Liver (CYP2D6 and CYP3A4-mediated)
- Elimination half-life: 20 hours (oral), 19 days (IM)
- Excretion: Feces

Identifiers
- IUPAC name: cis-(Z)-2-(4-(3-(2-chloro-9H-thioxanthen-9-ylidene)propyl)piperazin-1-yl)ethanol
- CAS Number: 53772-83-1 85721-05-7 (acetate) 64053-00-5 (decanoate)
- PubChem CID: 5311507
- DrugBank: DB01624
- ChemSpider: 4470984
- UNII: 47ISU063SG
- KEGG: D03556
- ChEBI: CHEBI:51364
- ChEMBL: ChEMBL53904
- CompTox Dashboard (EPA): DTXSID3048233
- ECHA InfoCard: 100.053.398

Chemical and physical data
- Formula: C_{22}H_{25}ClN_{2}OS
- Molar mass: 400.97 g·mol^{−1}
- 3D model (JSmol): Interactive image
- SMILES: Clc2cc1C(\c3c(Sc1cc2)cccc3)=C/CCN4CCN(CCO)CC4
- InChI: InChI=1S/C22H25ClN2OS/c23-17-7-8-22-20(16-17)18(19-4-1-2-6-21(19)27-22)5-3-9-24-10-12-25(13-11-24)14-15-26/h1-2,4-8,16,26H,3,9-15H2/b18-5-; Key:WFPIAZLQTJBIFN-DVZOWYKESA-N

Zuclopenthixol (brand names Cisordinol, Clopixol and others), also known as zuclopentixol, is a medication used to treat schizophrenia and other psychoses. It is classed, pharmacologically, as a typical antipsychotic. Chemically it is a thioxanthene. It is the cis-isomer of clopenthixol (Sordinol, Ciatyl). Clopenthixol was introduced in 1961, while zuclopenthixol was introduced in 1978.

Zuclopenthixol is a D_{1} and D_{2} antagonist, α_{1}-adrenergic and 5-HT_{2} antagonist. While it is approved for use in Australia, Canada, Ireland, India, Italy, New Zealand, Singapore, South Africa and the UK, it is not approved for use in the United States.

== Medical uses ==
=== Available forms ===
Zuclopenthixol is available in three major preparations:

- As zuclopenthixol decanoate (Clopixol Depot, Cisordinol Depot), it is a long-acting intramuscular injection. Its main use is as a long-acting injection given every two or three weeks to people with schizophrenia who have a poor compliance with medication and suffer frequent relapses of illness. There is some evidence it may be more helpful in managing aggressive behaviour.
- As zuclopenthixol acetate (Clopixol-Acuphase, Cisordinol-Acutard), it is a shorter-acting intramuscular injection used in the acute sedation of psychotic inpatients. The effect peaks at 48–72 hours providing 2–3 days of sedation.
- As zuclopenthixol dihydrochloride (Clopixol, Cisordinol), it is a tablet used in the treatment of schizophrenia in those who are compliant with oral medication.

It is also used in the treatment of acute bipolar mania.

=== Dosing ===
As a long-acting injection, zuclopenthixol decanoate comes in a 200 mg and 500 mg ampoule. Doses can vary from 50 mg weekly to the maximum licensed dose of 600 mg weekly. In general, the lowest effective dose to prevent relapse is preferred. The interval may be shorter as a patient starts on the medication before extending to 3 weekly intervals subsequently. The dose should be reviewed and reduced if side effects occur, though in the short-term an anticholinergic medication benztropine may be helpful for tremor and stiffness, while diazepam may be helpful for akathisia. 100 mg of zuclopenthixol decanoate is roughly equivalent to 20 mg of flupentixol decanoate or 12.5 mg of fluphenazine decanoate.

In oral form zuclopenthixol is available in 2, 10, 25 and 40 mg tablets, with a dose range of 20–60 mg daily.

== Side effects ==
Chronic administration of zuclopenthixol (30 mg/kg/day for two years) in rats resulted in small, but significant, increases in the incidence of thyroid parafollicular carcinomas and, in females, of mammary adenocarcinomas and of pancreatic islet cell adenomas and carcinomas. An increase in the incidence of mammary adenocarcinomas is a common finding for D_{2} antagonists which increase prolactin secretion when administered to rats. An increase in the incidence of pancreatic islet cell tumours has been observed for some other D_{2} antagonists. The physiological differences between rats and humans with regard to prolactin make the clinical significance of these findings unclear.

Withdrawal syndrome: Abrupt cessation of therapy may cause acute withdrawal symptoms (eg, nausea, vomiting, or insomnia). Symptoms usually begin in 1 to 4 days of withdrawal and subside within 1 to 2 weeks.

Other permanent side effects are similar to many other typical antipsychotics, namely extrapyramidal symptoms as a result of dopamine blockade in subcortical areas of the brain. This may result in symptoms similar to those seen in Parkinson's disease and include a restlessness and inability to sit still known as akathisia, a slow tremor and stiffness of the limbs. Zuclopenthixol is thought to be more sedating than the related flupentixol, though possibly less likely to induce extrapyramidal symptoms than other typical depots. As with other dopamine antagonists, zuclopenthixol may sometimes elevate prolactin levels; this may occasionally result in amenorrhoea or galactorrhoea in severe cases. Neuroleptic malignant syndrome is a rare but potentially fatal side effect. Any unexpected deterioration in mental state with confusion and muscle stiffness should be seen by a physician.

Zuclopenthixol decanoate induces a transient dose-dependent sedation. However, if the patient is switched to maintenance treatment with zuclopenthixol decanoate from oral zuclopenthixol or from i.m. zuclopenthixol acetate the sedation will be no problem. Tolerance to the unspecific sedative effect develops rapidly.

Very common Adverse Effects (≥10% incidence)

- Hypersalivation
- Somnolence
- Akathisia
- Hyperkinesia
- Hypokinesia

Common (1–10%)

- Tachycardia
- Heart palpitations
- Vertigo
- Accommodation disorder
- Abnormal vision
- Salivary hypersecretion
- Constipation
- Vomiting
- Dyspepsia
- Diarrhoea
- Asthenia
- Fatigue
- Malaise
- Pain (at the injection site)
- Increased appetite
- Weight gain
- Myalgia
- Tremor
- Dystonia
- Hypertonia
- Dizziness
- Headache
- Paraesthesia
- Disturbance in attention
- Amnesia
- Abnormal gait
- Insomnia
- Depression
- Anxiety
- Abnormal dreams
- Agitation
- Decreased libido
- Nasal congestion
- Dyspnoea
- Hyperhidrosis
- Pruritus

Uncommon (0.1–1%)

- Hyperacusis
- Tinnitus
- Mydriasis
- Abdominal pain
- Nausea
- Flatulence
- Thirst
- Injection site reaction
- Hypothermia
- Pyrexia
- Abnormal liver function tests
- Decreased appetite
- Weight loss
- Muscle rigidity
- Trismus
- Torticollis
- Tardive dyskinesia
- Hyperreflexia
- Dyskinesia
- Parkinsonism
- Syncope
- Ataxia
- Speech disorder
- Hypotonia
- Convulsion
- Migraine
- Apathy
- Nightmares
- Libido increased
- Confused state
- Ejaculation failure
- Erectile dysfunction
- Female orgasmic disorder
- Vulvovaginal
- Dryness
- Rash
- Photosensitivity
- Pigmentation disorder
- Seborrhoea
- Dermatitis
- Purpura
- Hypotension
- Hot flush

Rare (0.01–0.1%)

- Thrombocytopenia
- Neutropenia
- Leukopenia
- Agranulocytosis
- QT prolongation
- Hyperprolactinaemia
- Hypersensitivity
- Anaphylactic reaction
- Hyperglycaemia
- Glucose tolerance impaired
- Hyperlipidaemia
- Gynaecomastia
- Galactorrhoea
- Amenorrhoea
- Priapism
- Withdrawal symptoms

Very rare (<0.01%)

- Cholestatic hepatitis
- Jaundice
- Neuroleptic malignant syndrome
- Venous thromboembolism

== Pharmacology ==
=== Pharmacodynamics ===
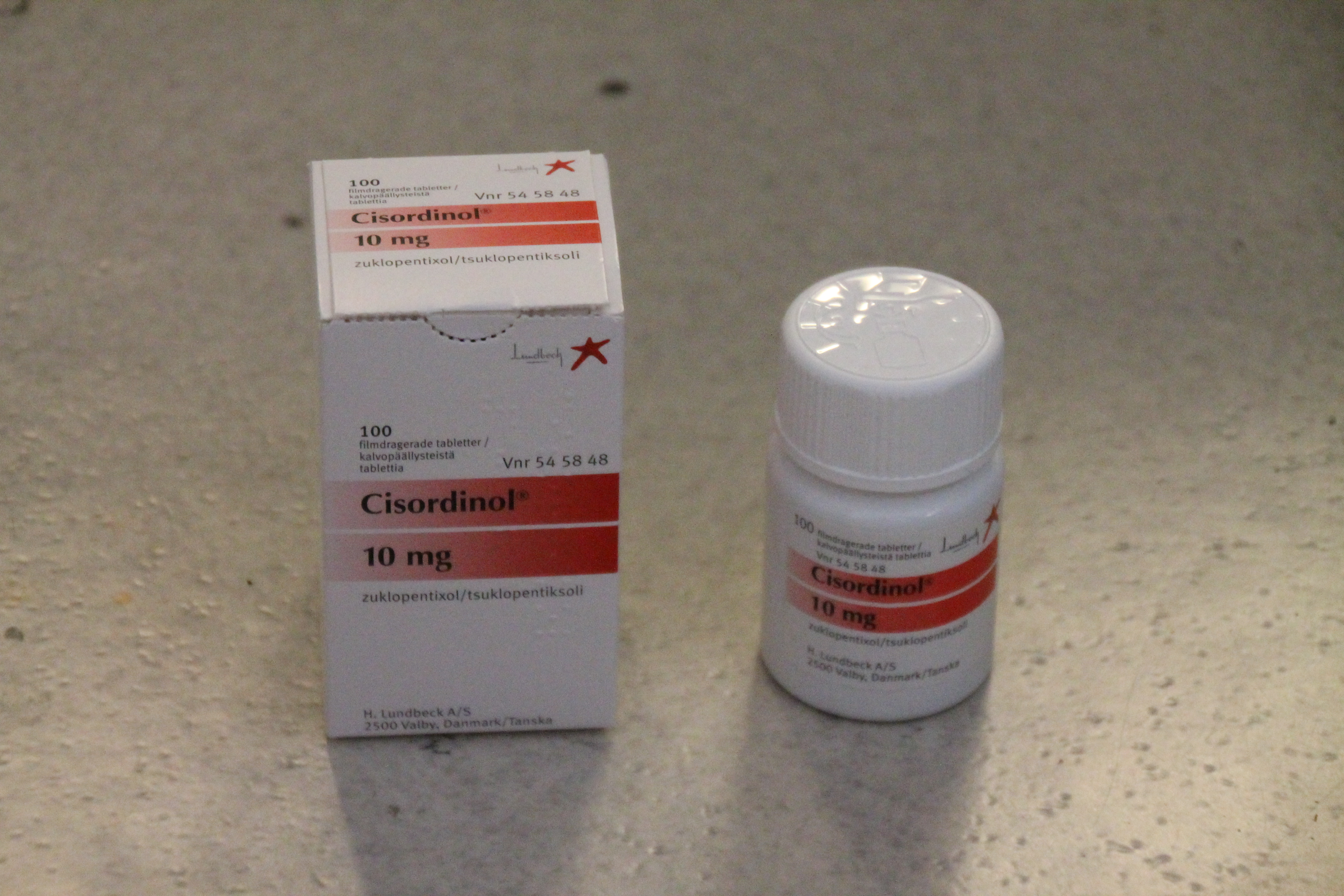
Cisordinol 10 mg tablets

Site	Action	Affinity
5-HT6	?	6.77
D1_{B}	Antagonism	?
5-HT2A	Antagonism	?
D1a	Antagonism	?
α1	Antagonism	?
D2	Antagonism	?
H1	Antagonism	?

Zuclopenthixol antagonises both dopamine D_{1} and D_{2} receptors, α_{1}-adrenoceptors and 5-HT_{2} receptors with a high affinity, but has no affinity for muscarinic acetylcholine receptors. It weakly antagonises the histamine (H_{1}) receptor but has no α_{2}-adrenoceptor blocking activity.

Evidence from in vitro work and clinical sources (i.e. therapeutic drug monitoring databases) suggests that both CYP2D6 and CYP3A4 play important roles in zuclopenthixol metabolism.

=== Pharmacokinetics ===
Pharmacokinetics of long-acting injectable antipsychotics
Medication	Brand name	Class	Vehicle	Dosage	T_{max}	t_{1/2} single	t_{1/2} multiple	logP^{c}	Ref
Aripiprazole lauroxil	Aristada	Atypical	Water^{a}	441–1064 mg/4–8 weeks	24–35 days	?	54–57 days	7.9–10.0	
Aripiprazole monohydrate	Abilify Maintena	Atypical	Water^{a}	300–400 mg/4 weeks	7 days	?	30–47 days	4.9–5.2	
Bromperidol decanoate	Impromen Decanoas	Typical	Sesame oil	40–300 mg/4 weeks	3–9 days	?	21–25 days	7.9	
Clopentixol decanoate	Sordinol Depot	Typical	Viscoleo^{b}	50–600 mg/1–4 weeks	4–7 days	?	19 days	9.0	
Flupentixol decanoate	Depixol	Typical	Viscoleo^{b}	10–200 mg/2–4 weeks	4–10 days	8 days	17 days	7.2–9.2	
Fluphenazine decanoate	Prolixin Decanoate	Typical	Sesame oil	12.5–100 mg/2–5 weeks	1–2 days	1–10 days	14–100 days	7.2–9.0	
Fluphenazine enanthate	Prolixin Enanthate	Typical	Sesame oil	12.5–100 mg/1–4 weeks	2–3 days	4 days	?	6.4–7.4	
Fluspirilene	Imap, Redeptin	Typical	Water^{a}	2–12 mg/1 week	1–8 days	7 days	?	5.2–5.8	
Haloperidol decanoate	Haldol Decanoate	Typical	Sesame oil	20–400 mg/2–4 weeks	3–9 days	18–21 days		7.2–7.9	
Olanzapine pamoate	Zyprexa Relprevv	Atypical	Water^{a}	150–405 mg/2–4 weeks	7 days	?	30 days	–	
Oxyprothepin decanoate	Meclopin	Typical	?	?	?	?	?	8.5–8.7	
Paliperidone palmitate	Invega Sustenna	Atypical	Water^{a}	39–819 mg/4–12 weeks	13–33 days	25–139 days	?	8.1–10.1	
Perphenazine decanoate	Trilafon Dekanoat	Typical	Sesame oil	50–200 mg/2–4 weeks	?	?	27 days	8.9	
Perphenazine enanthate	Trilafon Enanthate	Typical	Sesame oil	25–200 mg/2 weeks	2–3 days	?	4–7 days	6.4–7.2	
Pipotiazine palmitate	Piportil Longum	Typical	Viscoleo^{b}	25–400 mg/4 weeks	9–10 days	?	14–21 days	8.5–11.6	
Pipotiazine undecylenate	Piportil Medium	Typical	Sesame oil	100–200 mg/2 weeks	?	?	?	8.4	
Risperidone	Risperdal Consta	Atypical	Microspheres	12.5–75 mg/2 weeks	21 days	?	3–6 days	–	
Zuclopentixol acetate	Clopixol Acuphase	Typical	Viscoleo^{b}	50–200 mg/1–3 days	1–2 days	1–2 days		4.7–4.9	
Zuclopentixol decanoate	Clopixol Depot	Typical	Viscoleo^{b}	50–800 mg/2–4 weeks	4–9 days	?	11–21 days	7.5–9.0	
Note: All by intramuscular injection. Footnotes: ^{a} = Microcrystalline or nanocrystalline aqueous suspension. ^{b} = Low-viscosity vegetable oil (specifically fractionated coconut oil with medium-chain triglycerides). ^{c} = Predicted, from PubChem and DrugBank. Sources: Main: See template.

== History ==
Zuclopenthixol was introduced by Lundbeck in 1978.
