= Fluspirilene =

Typical antipsychotic medication

Clinical data
- Trade names: Imap
- AHFS/Drugs.com: International Drug Names
- Routes of administration: IM
- ATC code: N05AG01 (WHO)

Legal status
- Legal status: In general: ℞ (Prescription only)

Identifiers
- IUPAC name: 8-[4,4-Bis(4-fluorophenyl)butyl]-1-phenyl-1,3,8-triazaspiro[4.5]decan-4-one
- CAS Number: 1841-19-6
- PubChem CID: 3396
- IUPHAR/BPS: 85
- DrugBank: DB04842
- ChemSpider: 3279
- UNII: C5QA4GLR9M
- KEGG: D02629
- ChEMBL: ChEMBL46516
- CompTox Dashboard (EPA): DTXSID7045152
- ECHA InfoCard: 100.015.835

Chemical and physical data
- Formula: C_{29}H_{31}F_{2}N_{3}O
- Molar mass: 475.584 g·mol^{−1}
- 3D model (JSmol): Interactive image
- SMILES: Fc1ccc(cc1)C(c2ccc(F)cc2)CCCN5CCC4(C(=O)NCN4c3ccccc3)CC5
- InChI: InChI=1S/C29H31F2N3O/c30-24-12-8-22(9-13-24)27(23-10-14-25(31)15-11-23)7-4-18-33-19-16-29(17-20-33)28(35)32-21-34(29)26-5-2-1-3-6-26/h1-3,5-6,8-15,27H,4,7,16-21H2,(H,32,35); Key:QOYHHIBFXOOADH-UHFFFAOYSA-N

Fluspirilene (Redeptin, Imap, R6218) is a diphenylbutylpiperidine typical antipsychotic drug, used for the treatment of schizophrenia. It is administered intramuscularly. It was discovered at Janssen Pharmaceutica in 1963. A 2007 systematic review investigated the efficacy of fluspirilene decanoate for people with schizophrenia:

Fluspirilene decanoate compared to oral antipsychotics
Summary
Participant numbers in each comparison were small so power to identify clear difference is limited. Randomized controlled trial data identified no clear differences between the long-acting injection of fluspirilene and oral medication for outcomes that include adverse effects.

Outcome	Findings in words	Findings in numbers	Quality of evidence
Global outcome
Leaving the study early Follow up: 6 weeks to 5 months	Fluspirilene decanoate may increase the risk of leaving the study (reasons not specified), but, the difference is not clear between people given fluspirilene decanoate and those receiving oral antipsychotics. These findings are based on data of low quality.	RR 1.18 (0.08 to 16.78)	Low
Mental state
Relapse; Follow up: 6 weeks to 5 months	Using the depot, long-acting fluspirilene decanoate makes little difference for the outcome of 'relapse' compared with those receiving oral antipsychotics - at least for those willing to be engaged with trials. These findings are based on data of low quality.	RR 1.18 (0.08 to 16.78)	Low
Adverse effects
Needing anticholinergic drugs Follow up: 6 weeks to 5 months	The depot fluspirilene decanoate does not seem to cause any more movement disorders - for which anticholinergic drugs are used - compared with oral antipsychotics. These findings are based on data of low quality.	RR 0.07 (0.00 to 1.07)	Low
Dizziness	Fluspirilene decanoate may reduce the chance of experiencing dizziness compared with the oral antipsycotics. Data are based on low quality evidence.	RR 0.59 (0.37 to 0.95)	Low
Missing outcomes
	Data on quality of life, and service use (e.g. hospitalization) were not reported in trials.		

Pharmacokinetics of long-acting injectable antipsychotics
Medication	Brand name	Class	Vehicle	Dosage	T_{max}	t_{1/2} single	t_{1/2} multiple	logP^{c}	Ref
Aripiprazole lauroxil	Aristada	Atypical	Water^{a}	441–1064 mg/4–8 weeks	24–35 days	?	54–57 days	7.9–10.0	
Aripiprazole monohydrate	Abilify Maintena	Atypical	Water^{a}	300–400 mg/4 weeks	7 days	?	30–47 days	4.9–5.2	
Bromperidol decanoate	Impromen Decanoas	Typical	Sesame oil	40–300 mg/4 weeks	3–9 days	?	21–25 days	7.9	
Clopentixol decanoate	Sordinol Depot	Typical	Viscoleo^{b}	50–600 mg/1–4 weeks	4–7 days	?	19 days	9.0	
Flupentixol decanoate	Depixol	Typical	Viscoleo^{b}	10–200 mg/2–4 weeks	4–10 days	8 days	17 days	7.2–9.2	
Fluphenazine decanoate	Prolixin Decanoate	Typical	Sesame oil	12.5–100 mg/2–5 weeks	1–2 days	1–10 days	14–100 days	7.2–9.0	
Fluphenazine enanthate	Prolixin Enanthate	Typical	Sesame oil	12.5–100 mg/1–4 weeks	2–3 days	4 days	?	6.4–7.4	
Fluspirilene	Imap, Redeptin	Typical	Water^{a}	2–12 mg/1 week	1–8 days	7 days	?	5.2–5.8	
Haloperidol decanoate	Haldol Decanoate	Typical	Sesame oil	20–400 mg/2–4 weeks	3–9 days	18–21 days		7.2–7.9	
Olanzapine pamoate	Zyprexa Relprevv	Atypical	Water^{a}	150–405 mg/2–4 weeks	7 days	?	30 days	–	
Oxyprothepin decanoate	Meclopin	Typical	?	?	?	?	?	8.5–8.7	
Paliperidone palmitate	Invega Sustenna	Atypical	Water^{a}	39–819 mg/4–12 weeks	13–33 days	25–139 days	?	8.1–10.1	
Perphenazine decanoate	Trilafon Dekanoat	Typical	Sesame oil	50–200 mg/2–4 weeks	?	?	27 days	8.9	
Perphenazine enanthate	Trilafon Enanthate	Typical	Sesame oil	25–200 mg/2 weeks	2–3 days	?	4–7 days	6.4–7.2	
Pipotiazine palmitate	Piportil Longum	Typical	Viscoleo^{b}	25–400 mg/4 weeks	9–10 days	?	14–21 days	8.5–11.6	
Pipotiazine undecylenate	Piportil Medium	Typical	Sesame oil	100–200 mg/2 weeks	?	?	?	8.4	
Risperidone	Risperdal Consta	Atypical	Microspheres	12.5–75 mg/2 weeks	21 days	?	3–6 days	–	
Zuclopentixol acetate	Clopixol Acuphase	Typical	Viscoleo^{b}	50–200 mg/1–3 days	1–2 days	1–2 days		4.7–4.9	
Zuclopentixol decanoate	Clopixol Depot	Typical	Viscoleo^{b}	50–800 mg/2–4 weeks	4–9 days	?	11–21 days	7.5–9.0	
Note: All by intramuscular injection. Footnotes: ^{a} = Microcrystalline or nanocrystalline aqueous suspension. ^{b} = Low-viscosity vegetable oil (specifically fractionated coconut oil with medium-chain triglycerides). ^{c} = Predicted, from PubChem and DrugBank. Sources: Main: See template.

== See also ==
- Pimozide
- Penfluridol
- Spirodecanone
- Spiperone
- Mosapramine (atypical antipsychotic)
