= Japanese Adverse Drug Event Report database =

The Japanese Adverse Drug Event Report (JADER) database is a spontaneous reporting system of drug adverse events which is managed by the Pharmaceuticals and Medical Devices Agency (PMDA) in Japan. It has been available since 2012.

== See also ==
- Pharmacovigilance
- FDA Adverse Event Reporting System (FAERS)
