= Microcrystalline =

Type of crystallized substance

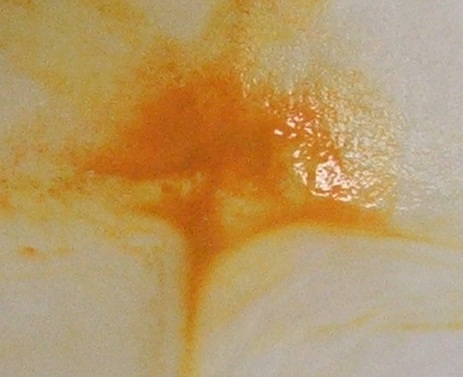
Microcrystalline copper(I) oxide

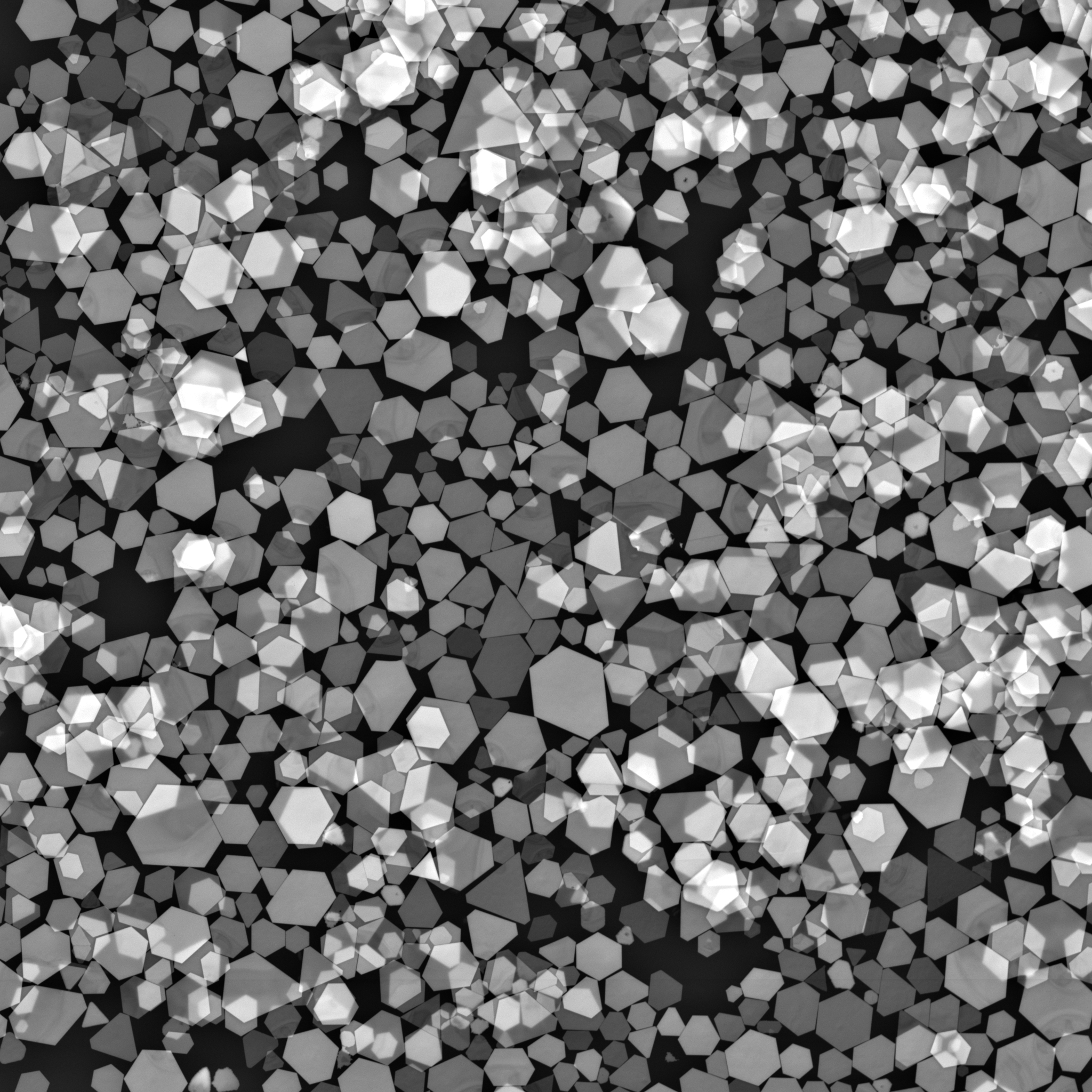
Silver microcrystals imaged by an electron microscope

A microcrystalline material is a crystallized substance or rock that contains small crystals visible only through microscopic examination. There is little agreement on the range of crystal sizes that should be regarded as microcrystalline, but the extreme range of values suggested is 1 to 200 microns.

== See also ==
- Cryptocrystalline – Type of rock texture
- Macrocrystalline
- Microcrystalline cellulose – Refined wood pulp
- Microcrystalline wax – Type of wax with fine crystals
- Nanocrystalline – Type of polycrystalline material
- Nanocrystalline silicon
- Protocrystalline
- Rock microstructure – Relationship between materials which compose a rock
