= Medium-chain triglyceride =

Medium-chain fatty acids

Typical example of a medium-chain triglyceride, containing three medium-chain fatty acids (caprylic acid in blue and capric acid in red)

A medium-chain triglyceride (MCT) is a triglyceride with two or three fatty acids having an aliphatic tail of 6–12 carbon atoms, i.e. a medium-chain fatty acid (MCFA). Rich food sources for commercial extraction of MCTs include palm kernel oil and coconut oil.

== Sources ==
MCTs are found in palm kernel oil and coconut oil and can be separated by fractionation. They can also be produced by interesterification. Retail MCT powder is MCT oil embedded in starch and thus contains carbohydrates in addition to fats. It is manufactured by spray drying.

== Medium-chain fatty acids ==
Medium chain fatty acids
Lipid number	Name		Salt/ester name		Formula		Mass (g/mol)	Appearance	Chemical structure
Lipid number	Common	Systematic	Common	Systematic	Molecular	Structural	Mass (g/mol)	Appearance	Chemical structure
C6:0	Caproic acid	Hexanoic acid	Caproate	Hexanoate	C_{6}H_{12}O_{2}	CH_{3}(CH_{2})_{4}COOH	116.16	Oily liquid	
C8:0	Caprylic acid	Octanoic acid	Caprylate	Octanoate	C_{8}H_{16}O_{2}	CH_{3}(CH_{2})_{6}COOH	144.21	Oily liquid	
C10:0	Capric acid	Decanoic acid	Caprate	Decanoate	C_{10}H_{20}O_{2}	CH_{3}(CH_{2})_{8}COOH	172.26	White crystals	
C12:0	Lauric acid	Dodecanoic acid	Laurate	Dodecanoate	C_{12}H_{24}O_{2}	CH_{3}(CH_{2})_{10}COOH	200.32	White powder	

With regard to MCFAs, apart from the above listed straight chain (unbranched chain) fatty acids, side chain (branched chain) fatty acids also exist.

== Applications ==
=== Calorie restriction ===
A 2020 systematic review and meta-analysis reported evidence that MCT consumption decreases subsequent energy intake compared to long-chain triglycerides (LCTs). Despite this, it does not appear to affect appetite, leading the authors to state that further research is required to reveal the mechanism.

=== Dietary relevance ===
Molecular weight analysis of milk from multiple species reported that while milk fats from all studied species were primarily composed of long-chain fatty acids (16 and 18 carbons long), approximately 10–20% of the fatty acids in milk from horses, cows, sheep, and goats were MCFAs.

Some studies have reported that MCTs can burn excess calories, advancing weight loss. MCTs are also reported to promote fat oxidation and reduce food intake. MCTs have been recommended by some endurance athletes and the bodybuilding community. While health benefits from MCTs have been reported, improved exercise performance is inconclusive. A number of studies back the use of MCT for weight loss, but these claims are conflicted.

=== Pharmaceutical relevance ===
MCTs can be consumed in solutions, liquid suspensions and lipid-based drug delivery systems for emulsions, self-emulsifying drug delivery systems, creams, ointments, gels and foams as well as suppositories. MCTs are also suitable for use as solvent and liquid oily lubricant in soft gels. Brand names of pharmaceutical-grade MCT include Kollisolv MCT 70.

=== Medical relevance ===
MCTs passively diffuse from the GI tract to the hepatic portal system (longer fatty acids are absorbed into the lymphatic system) without requirement for modification like long-chain fatty acids or very-long-chain fatty acids. In addition, MCTs do not require bile salts for absorption. Patients who have malnutrition, malabsorption or particular fatty-acid metabolism disorders are treated with MCTs because MCTs do not require energy for absorption, use, or storage.

Medium-chain triglycerides are generally considered a good biologically inert source of energy that the human body finds reasonably easy to metabolize. They have potentially beneficial attributes in protein metabolism, but may be contraindicated in some situations due to a reported tendency to induce ketogenesis and metabolic acidosis. However, other evidence supports no risk of ketoacidosis or ketonemia at levels associated with normal consumption, and that moderately elevated blood ketones can be an effective treatment for epilepsy.

Due to their ability to be absorbed rapidly by the body, MCTs have found use in the treatment of a variety of malabsorption ailments. MCT supplementation with a low-fat diet has been described as the cornerstone of treatment for Waldmann disease. MCTs are an ingredient in some parenteral nutritional emulsions in some countries. Studies have also reported promising results for epilepsy through the use of ketogenic dieting.

Orally ingested medium-chain triglycerides are rapidly degraded by first-pass metabolism in the liver via the portal vein, and are quickly metabolized via coenzyme A intermediates through β-oxidation and the citric acid cycle to produce carbon dioxide, acetate and ketone bodies. Whether the ketones β-hydroxybutyrate and acetone have direct antiseizure activity is unclear.

=== Technical uses ===
MCTs are bland compared to other fats and do not generate off-notes (dissonant tastes) as quickly as LCTs. They are also more polar than LCTs. Because of these attributes, they are widely used as carrier oils or solvents for flavours and oral medicines and vitamins.

== See also ==
- List of carboxylic acids
- Ketogenic diet
- List of saturated fatty acids
