= Rabbit syndrome =

Drug side effect

Rabbit syndrome is a rare form of extrapyramidal side effect of antipsychotic drugs in which perioral tremors occur at a rate of approximately 5 Hz. Rabbit syndrome is characterized by involuntary, fine, rhythmic motions of the mouth along a vertical plane, without involvement of the tongue, and resembling the chewing movements of a rabbit. It is usually seen after years of pharmacotherapy, and is more prominent with high potency drugs like haloperidol, fluphenazine, and pimozide. There is also a low incidence with thioridazine, clozapine, olanzapine, aripiprazole, and low doses of risperidone.

Rabbit syndrome can be treated with anticholinergic drugs. It generally disappears within a few days of treatment but may re-emerge after anticholinergic treatment is stopped. Another treatment strategy is to switch the patient to an atypical antipsychotic with high anti-cholinergic properties.
