= Periciazine =

Typical antipsychotic medication

Clinical data
- Pregnancy category: AU: C
- Routes of administration: Oral
- Drug class: Typical antipsychotic
- ATC code: N05AC01 (WHO)

Legal status
- Legal status: AU: S4 (Prescription only); BR: Class C1 (Other controlled substances); CA: ℞-only; UK: POM (Prescription only); In general: ℞ (Prescription only)

Pharmacokinetic data
- Metabolism: Hepatic (mostly via conjugation)
- Elimination half-life: 12 h
- Excretion: Renal

Identifiers
- IUPAC name: 10-[3-(4-hydroxypiperidin-1-yl)propyl]-10H-phenothiazine-2-carbonitrile
- CAS Number: 2622-26-6
- PubChem CID: 4747
- DrugBank: DB01608
- ChemSpider: 4585
- UNII: 3405M6FD73
- KEGG: D01485
- ChEBI: CHEBI:31981
- ChEMBL: ChEMBL251940
- CompTox Dashboard (EPA): DTXSID5045910
- ECHA InfoCard: 100.018.248

Chemical and physical data
- Formula: C_{21}H_{23}N_{3}OS
- Molar mass: 365.50 g·mol^{−1}
- 3D model (JSmol): Interactive image
- SMILES: C1CN(CCC1O)CCCN2C3=CC=CC=C3SC4=C2C=C(C=C4)C#N
- InChI: InChI=1S/C21H23N3OS/c22-15-16-6-7-21-19(14-16)24(18-4-1-2-5-20(18)26-21)11-3-10-23-12-8-17(25)9-13-23/h1-2,4-7,14,17,25H,3,8-13H2; Key:LUALIOATIOESLM-UHFFFAOYSA-N

Periciazine (INN), also known as pericyazine (BAN) or propericiazine, is a drug that belongs to the phenothiazine class of typical antipsychotics.

Periciazine is not approved for sale in the United States. It is commonly sold in Canada, Italy and Russia under the tradename Neuleptil and in United Kingdom and Australia under the tradename Neulactil.

== Medical uses ==
The primary uses of periciazine include in the short-term treatment of severe anxiety or tension and in the maintenance treatment of psychotic disorders such as schizophrenia. There is insufficient evidence to determine whether periciazine is more or less effective than other antipsychotics. Dopamine receptor subtype analysis has not been performed for pericyazine, but the drug appears to induce greater noradrenergic than dopaminergic blockade (Nishikawa 1989). Compared to chlorpromazine, pericyazine reportedly has more potent antiemetic, antiserotonin, and anticholinergic activity. A 2014 systematic review compared periciazine with typical antipsychotics for schizophrenia:

Periciazine versus typical antipsychotic for schizophrenia
Summary
On the basis of very low quality evidence it is not possible to determine the effects of periciazine in comparison with antipsychotics such as chlorpromazine or trifluoperazine for the treatment of schizophrenia. There is some evidence, however, that periciazine may be associated with a higher incidence of extrapyramidal side effects than other antipsychotics.

Outcome	Findings in words	Findings in numbers	Quality of evidence
Global state
Not improved Follow-up: 6-12 weeks	Periciazine may increase the risk of being 'not improved', but, at present it is not possible to be confident about the difference between people receiving periciazine and those given chlorpromazine or trifluoperazine. Data supporting this finding are very limited.	RR 1.24 (0.93 to 1.66)	Very low
Adverse events
Extrapyramidal side effect Follow-up: 6-12 weeks	Periciazine may reduce the chance of experiencing the movement disorder, compared with chlorpromazine or trifluoperazine, but, at present there is only very limited data supporting this finding.	RR 0.59 (0.38 to 0.89)	Very low
Leaving the study early
For any reasons Follow-up: 9-12 weeks	Periciazine may reduce the chance of leaving the study early, but, at present it is not possible to be confident about the difference between the two treatments and data supporting this finding are very limited.	RR 0.46 (0.11 to 1.9)	Very low
Missing outcomes
	No study reported any data on outcomes such as relapse, mental state, cost-effectiveness, and information relating to behavior		

Periciazine has also been studied in the treatment of opioid dependence.

== Adverse effects ==
Periciazine is a rather sedating and anticholinergic antipsychotic, and despite being classed with the typical antipsychotics, its risk of extrapyramidal side effects is comparatively low. It has a relatively high risk of causing hyperprolactinaemia and a moderate risk of causing weight gain and orthostatic hypotension.
