= Antipsychotic =

Class of medications

- Drug class
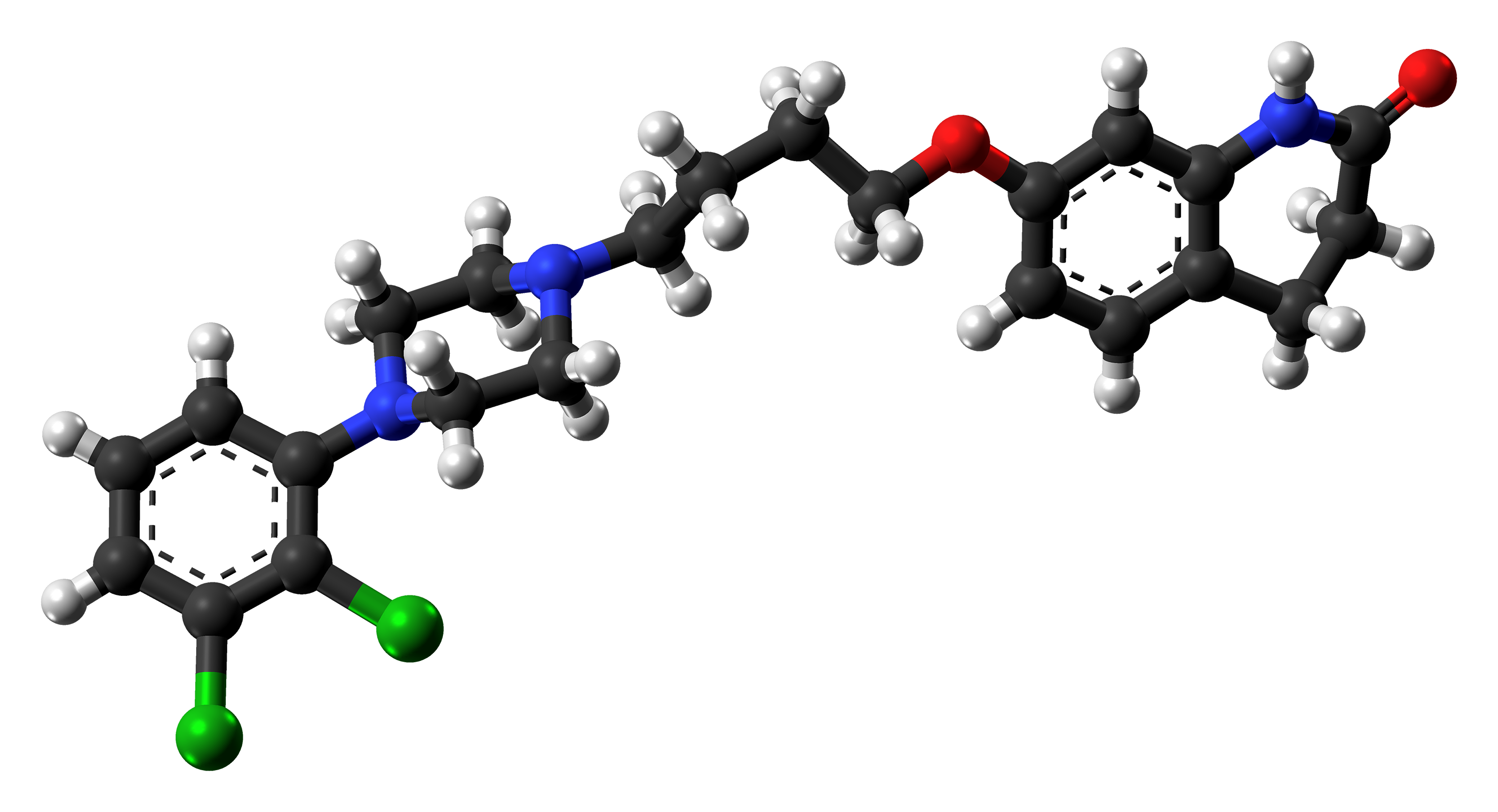
- Aripiprazole, the prototypical third-generation atypical antipsychotic

Class identifiers
- Synonyms: Neuroleptics, major tranquilizers
- Use: Principally: Schizophrenia, schizoaffective disorder, dementia, Tourette syndrome, bipolar disorder, irritability in autism spectrum disorder, borderline personality disorder

Clinical data
- Drugs.com: Drug Classes

External links
- MeSH: D014150

Legal status

Antipsychotics, previously known as neuroleptics and major tranquilizers, are a class of psychotropic medication primarily used to manage psychosis (including delusions, hallucinations, paranoia or disordered thought), principally in schizophrenia but also in a range of other psychotic disorders. Together with mood stabilizers, they are also a mainstay in the treatment of bipolar disorder. Moreover, they are also used as adjuncts in the treatment of treatment-resistant major depressive disorder.

The use of antipsychotics may result in many unwanted side-effects, such as involuntary movement disorders, gynecomastia, impotence, weight-gain and metabolic syndrome. Long-term use can produce adverse effects, such as tardive dyskinesia, tardive dystonia, tardive akathisia, and brain-tissue volume-reduction. Withdrawal from antipsychotics can cause insomnia, tremors, and psychotic symptoms.

First-generation antipsychotics (e.g., chlorpromazine, haloperidol, etc.), known as typical antipsychotics, were first introduced in the 1950s, and others were developed until the early 1970s. Second-generation antipsychotics, known as atypical antipsychotics, arrived with the introduction of clozapine in the early 1970s followed by others (e.g., risperidone, olanzapine, etc.). Both generations of medication block receptors in the brain for dopamine, but atypicals block serotonin receptors as well. Third-generation antipsychotics, introduced in the 2000s, offer partial agonism, rather than blockade, of dopamine receptors.

Neuroleptic, originating from the Ancient Greek terms νεῦρον ('neuron') and λαμβάνω ('to take hold of')—thus meaning 'which takes the nerve'—refers both to common neurological effects and to side-effects. An estimated 1.7% of adults in the United States take antipsychotics, according to a 2018 study.

== Medical uses ==
Antipsychotics are most frequently used for the following conditions:

- Schizophrenia
- Schizoaffective disorder most commonly in conjunction with either an antidepressant (in the case of the depressive subtype) or a mood stabilizer (in the case of the bipolar subtype). Antipsychotics possess mood stabilizing properties and thus they may be used as standalone medication to treat mood dysregulation.
- Acute mania and mixed episodes in bipolar disorder may be treated with either typical or atypical antipsychotics, although atypical antipsychotics are usually preferred because they tend to have more favourable adverse effect profiles and, according to a recent meta-analysis, they tend to have a lower liability for causing conversion from mania to depression.
- Psychotic depression. In this indication it is a common practice for the psychiatrist to prescribe a combination of an atypical antipsychotic and an antidepressant as this practice is best supported by the evidence.
- Treatment-resistant depression as an adjunct to standard antidepressant therapy.

Given the limited options available to treat the behavioral problems associated with dementia, other pharmacological and non-pharmacological interventions are usually attempted before using antipsychotics. A risk-to-benefit analysis is performed to weigh the risk of the adverse effects of antipsychotics versus: the potential benefit, the adverse effects of alternative interventions, and the risk of failing to intervene when a patient's behavior becomes unsafe. The same can be said for insomnia, in which they are not recommended as first-line therapy. There are evidence-based indications for using antipsychotics in children (e.g., tic disorder, bipolar disorder, psychosis), but the use of antipsychotics outside of those contexts (e.g., to treat behavioral problems) warrants significant caution.

Antipsychotics are used to treat tics associated with Tourette syndrome. Aripiprazole, an atypical antipsychotic, is used as add-on medication to ameliorate sexual dysfunction as a symptom of selective serotonin reuptake inhibitor (SSRI) antidepressants in women. Quetiapine is used to treat generalized anxiety disorder.

=== Schizophrenia ===
Antipsychotic drug treatment is a key component of schizophrenia treatment recommendations by the National Institute of Health and Care Excellence (NICE), the American Psychiatric Association, and the British Society for Psychopharmacology. The main aim of treatment with antipsychotics is to reduce the positive symptoms of psychosis, that include delusions and hallucinations. There is mixed evidence to support a significant impact of antipsychotic use on primary negative symptoms (such as apathy, lack of emotional affect, and lack of interest in social interactions) or on cognitive symptoms (memory impairments, reduced ability to plan and execute tasks).

In general, the efficacy of antipsychotic treatment in reducing positive symptoms appears to increase with the severity of baseline symptoms. All antipsychotic medications work relatively the same way: by antagonizing D2 dopamine receptors. However, there are some differences when it comes to typical and atypical antipsychotics. For example, atypical antipsychotic medications have been seen to lower the neurocognitive impairment associated with schizophrenia more than conventional antipsychotics, although the reasoning and mechanics of this are still unclear to researchers.

Applications of antipsychotic drugs in the treatment of schizophrenia include prophylaxis for those showing symptoms that suggest that they are at high risk of developing psychosis; treatment of first-episode psychosis; maintenance therapy (a form of prophylaxis, maintenance therapy aims to maintain therapeutic benefit and prevent symptom relapse); and treatment of recurrent episodes of acute psychosis. A recent 2024 study found that using high doses of antipsychotics for schizophrenia was linked to a higher risk of mortality. Researchers analyzed data from 32,240 individuals aged 17 to 64 diagnosed with schizophrenia between 2002 and 2012 to arrive at this conclusion.

==== Prevention of psychosis and symptom improvement ====
Test batteries such as the PACE (Personal Assessment and Crisis Evaluation Clinic) and COPS (Criteria of Prodromal Syndromes), which measure low-level psychotic symptoms and cognitive disturbances, are used to evaluate people with early, low-level symptoms of psychosis. Test results are combined with family history information to identify patients in the "high-risk" group; they are considered to have a 20–40% risk of progression to frank psychosis within two years. These patients are often treated with low doses of antipsychotic drugs with the goal of reducing their symptoms and preventing progression to frank psychosis. While generally useful for reducing symptoms, clinical trials to date show little evidence that early use of antipsychotics improves long-term outcomes in those with prodromal symptoms, either alone or in combination with cognitive-behavioral therapy.

==== First-episode psychosis ====
First-episode psychosis (FEP) is the first time that psychotic symptoms are presented. NICE recommends that all people presenting with first-episode psychosis be treated with both an antipsychotic drug and cognitive behavioral therapy (CBT). NICE further recommends that those expressing a preference for CBT alone be informed that combination treatment is more effective. A diagnosis of schizophrenia is not made at this time as it takes longer to be determined by both DSM-5 and ICD-11, and only around 60% of those presenting with a first episode of psychosis will later be diagnosed with schizophrenia.

The conversion rate for a first episode of drug induced psychosis to bipolar disorder or schizophrenia is lower, with 30% of people converting to either bipolar disorder or schizophrenia. NICE makes no distinction between substance-induced psychosis and any other form of psychosis. The rate of conversion differs for different classes of drugs.

Pharmacological options for the specific treatment of FEP have been discussed in recent reviews. The goals of treatment for FEP include reducing symptoms and potentially improving long-term treatment outcomes. Randomized clinical trials have provided evidence for the efficacy of antipsychotic drugs in achieving the former goal, with first-generation and second generation antipsychotics showing about equal efficacy. The evidence that early treatment has a favorable effect on long-term outcomes is equivocal.

==== Recurrent psychotic episodes ====
Placebo-controlled trials of both first- and second-generation antipsychotic drugs consistently demonstrate the superiority of active drugs over placebos in suppressing psychotic symptoms. A large meta-analysis of 38 trials of antipsychotic drugs in schizophrenia with acute psychotic episodes showed an effect size of about 0.5. There is little or no difference in efficacy among approved antipsychotic drugs, including both first- and second-generation agents. The efficacy of such drugs is suboptimal. Few patients achieve complete resolution of symptoms. Response rates, calculated using various cutoff values for symptom reduction, are low, and their interpretation is complicated by high placebo response rates and selective publication of clinical trial results.

==== Maintenance therapy ====
The majority of patients treated with an antipsychotic drug will experience a response within four weeks. The goals of continuing treatment are to maintain suppression of symptoms, prevent relapse, improve quality of life, and support engagement in psychosocial therapy.

Maintenance therapy with antipsychotic drugs is clearly superior to placebo in preventing relapse but is associated with weight gain, movement disorders, and high dropout rates. A 3-year trial following persons receiving maintenance therapy after an acute psychotic episode found that 33% obtained long-lasting symptom reduction, 13% achieved remission, and only 27% experienced satisfactory quality of life. The effect of relapse prevention on long term outcomes is uncertain, as historical studies show little difference in long term outcomes before and after the introduction of antipsychotic drugs.

While maintenance therapy clearly reduces the rate of relapses requiring hospitalization, a large observational study in Finland found that, in people that eventually discontinued antipsychotics, the risk of being hospitalized again for a mental health problem or dying increased the longer they were dispensed (and presumably took) antipsychotics prior to stopping therapy. If people did not stop taking antipsychotics, they remained at low risk for relapse and hospitalization compared to those that did. The authors speculated that the difference may be because the people that discontinued treatment after a longer time had more severe mental illness than those that discontinued antipsychotic therapy sooner.

A significant challenge in the use of antipsychotic drugs for the prevention of relapse is the poor rate of adherence. In spite of the relatively high rates of adverse effects associated with these drugs, some evidence, including higher dropout rates in placebo arms compared to treatment arms in randomized clinical trials, suggests that most patients who discontinue treatment do so because of suboptimal efficacy. If someone experiences psychotic symptoms due to nonadherence, they may be compelled to receive treatment through a process called involuntary commitment, in which they can be forced to accept treatment (including antipsychotics). A person can also be committed to treatment outside of a hospital, called outpatient commitment.

Antipsychotics in long-acting injectable (LAI), or "depot", form have been suggested as a method of decreasing medication nonadherence (sometimes also called non-compliance). NICE advises LAIs be offered to patients when preventing covert, intentional nonadherence is a clinical priority. LAIs are used to ensure adherence in outpatient commitment. A meta-analysis found that LAIs resulted in lower rates of rehospitalization with a hazard ratio of 0.83; however, these results were not statistically significant (the 95% confidence interval was 0.62 to 1.11).

=== Bipolar disorder ===
Antipsychotics are routinely used, often in conjunction with mood stabilizers such as lithium/valproate, as a first-line treatment for manic and mixed episodes associated with bipolar disorder. The reason for this combination is the therapeutic delay of the aforementioned mood stabilizers (for valproate therapeutic effects are usually seen around five days after treatment is commenced whereas lithium usually takes at least a week before the full therapeutic effects are seen) and the comparatively rapid antimanic effects of antipsychotic drugs. The antipsychotics have a documented efficacy when used alone in acute mania/mixed episodes.

At least five atypical antipsychotics (lumateperone, cariprazine, lurasidone, olanzapine, and quetiapine) have also been found to possess efficacy in the treatment of bipolar depression as a monotherapy, whereas only olanzapine and quetiapine have been proven to be effective broad-spectrum (i.e., against all three types of relapse—manic, mixed and depressive) prophylactic (or maintenance) treatments in patients with bipolar disorder. A recent Cochrane review also found that olanzapine had a less favourable risk/benefit ratio than lithium as a maintenance treatment for bipolar disorder.

The American Psychiatric Association and the UK National Institute for Health and Care Excellence recommend antipsychotics for managing acute psychotic episodes in schizophrenia or bipolar disorder, and as a longer-term maintenance treatment for reducing the likelihood of further episodes. They state that response to any given antipsychotic can be variable so that trials may be necessary, and that lower doses are to be preferred where possible. A number of studies have looked at levels of "compliance" or "adherence" with antipsychotic regimes and found that discontinuation (stopping taking them) by patients is associated with higher rates of relapse, including hospitalization.

=== Dementia ===
Psychosis and agitation develop in as many as 80 percent of people living in nursing homes. Despite a lack of FDA approval and black-box warnings, atypical antipsychotics are very often prescribed to people with dementia. An assessment for an underlying cause of behavior is needed before prescribing antipsychotic medication for symptoms of dementia.

Antipsychotics in old age dementia showed a modest benefit compared to placebo in managing aggression or psychosis, but this is combined with a fairly large increase in serious adverse events. Thus, antipsychotics should not be used routinely to treat dementia with aggression or psychosis, but may be an option in a few cases where there is severe distress or risk of physical harm to others.

Psychosocial interventions may reduce the need for antipsychotics. In 2005, the FDA issued an advisory warning of an increased risk of death when atypical antipsychotics are used in dementia. In the subsequent 5 years, the use of atypical antipsychotics to treat dementia decreased by nearly 50%.

=== Major depressive disorder ===
A number of atypical antipsychotics have some benefits when used in addition to other treatments in major depressive disorder. Aripiprazole, quetiapine extended-release, and olanzapine (when used in conjunction with fluoxetine) have received the Food and Drug Administration (FDA) labelling for this indication. There is, however, a greater risk of side effects with their use compared to using traditional antidepressants. The greater risk of serious side effects with antipsychotics is why, e.g., quetiapine was denied approval as monotherapy for major depressive disorder or generalized anxiety disorder, and instead was only approved as an adjunctive treatment in combination with traditional antidepressants.

A recent study on the use of antipsychotics in unipolar depression concluded that the use of those drugs in addition to antidepressants alone leads to a worse disease outcome. This effect is especially pronounced in younger patients with psychotic unipolar depression. Considering the wide use of such combination therapies, further studies on the side effects of antipsychotics as an add-on therapy are warranted.

=== Other ===
Global antipsychotic utilization has seen a steady growth since the introduction of atypical (second-generation) antipsychotics and this is ascribed to off-label use for many other unapproved disorders. Besides the above uses antipsychotics may be used for obsessive–compulsive disorder, post-traumatic stress disorder, personality disorders, Tourette syndrome, autism and agitation in those with dementia. Evidence however does not support the use of atypical antipsychotics in eating disorders or personality disorder. The atypical antipsychotic risperidone may be useful for obsessive–compulsive disorder.

The use of low doses of antipsychotics for insomnia, while common, is not recommended as there is little evidence of benefit as well as concern regarding adverse effects. Some of the more serious adverse effects may also occur at the low doses used, such as dyslipidemia and neutropenia, and a recent network meta-analysis of 154 double-blind, randomized controlled trials of drug therapies vs. placebo for insomnia in adults found that quetiapine did not demonstrated any short-term benefits in sleep quality.

Low dose antipsychotics may also be used in treatment of impulse-behavioural and cognitive-perceptual symptoms of borderline personality disorder. Despite the lack of evidence supporting the benefit of antipsychotics in people with personality disorders, 1 in 4 who do not have a serious mental illness are prescribed them in UK primary care. Many people receive these medication for over a year, contrary to NICE guidelines.

In children they may be used in those with disruptive behavior disorders, mood disorders and pervasive developmental disorders or intellectual disability. Antipsychotics are only weakly recommended for Tourette syndrome, because although they are effective, side effects are common. The situation is similar for those on the autism spectrum.

Much of the evidence for the off-label use of antipsychotics (for example, for dementia, OCD, PTSD, personality disorders, Tourette's) was of insufficient scientific quality to support such use, especially as there was strong evidence of increased risks of stroke, tremors, significant weight gain, sedation, and gastrointestinal problems. A UK review of unlicensed usage in children and adolescents reported a similar mixture of findings and concerns.

A survey of children with pervasive developmental disorder found that 16.5% were taking an antipsychotic drug, most commonly for irritability, aggression, and agitation. Both risperidone and aripiprazole have been approved by the US FDA for the treatment of irritability in autistic children and adolescents. A review in the UK found that the use of antipsychotics in England doubled between 2000 and 2019. Children were prescribed antipsychotics for conditions for which there is no approval, such as autism.

Aggressive challenging behavior in adults with intellectual disability is often treated with antipsychotic drugs despite lack of an evidence base. A recent randomized controlled trial, however, found no benefit over placebo and recommended that the use of antipsychotics in this way should no longer be regarded as an acceptable routine treatment.

Antipsychotics may be an option, together with stimulants, in people with ADHD and aggressive behavior when other treatments have not worked, however, they have predominantly opposing effects and may have additive cardiovascular risks when used together. They have not been found to be useful for the prevention of delirium among those admitted to hospital. A 2019 study using national prescribing data found that antipsychotics were prescribed to a significant minority of youth with attention deficit hyperactivity disorder (ADHD), frequently without FDA-approved indications and in cases where stimulant medications had not been tried first, raising concerns about guideline adherence in pediatric treatment.

=== Typicals vs atypicals ===
Aside from reduced extrapyramidal symptoms, and with the clear exception of clozapine, it is unclear whether the atypical (second-generation) antipsychotics offer advantages over older, first generation antipsychotics. Amisulpride, olanzapine, risperidone and clozapine may be more effective but are associated with greater side effects. Typical antipsychotics have equal drop-out and symptom relapse rates to atypicals when used at low to moderate dosages.

Clozapine is an effective treatment for those who respond poorly to other drugs ("treatment-resistant" or "refractory" schizophrenia), but it has the potentially serious side effect of agranulocytosis (lowered white blood cell count) in less than 4% of people.

Due to bias in the research the accuracy of comparisons of atypical antipsychotics is a concern.

In 2005, a US government body, the National Institute of Mental Health published the results of a major independent study (the CATIE project). No other atypical studied (risperidone, quetiapine, and ziprasidone) did better than the first-generation antipsychotic perphenazine on the measures used, nor did they produce fewer adverse effects than the typical antipsychotic perphenazine, although more patients discontinued perphenazine owing to extrapyramidal effects compared to the atypical agents (8% vs. 2% to 4%). This is significant because any patient with tardive dyskinesia was specifically excluded from randomization to perphenazine; i.e., in the CATIE study the patient cohort randomized to receive perphenazine was at lower risk of having extrapyramidal symptoms.

Atypical antipsychotics do not appear to lead to improved rates of medication adherence compared to typical antipsychotics.

Many researchers question the first-line prescribing of atypicals over typicals, and some even question the distinction between the two classes. In contrast, other researchers point to the significantly higher risk of tardive dyskinesia and other extrapyramidal symptoms with the typicals and for this reason alone recommend first-line treatment with the atypicals, notwithstanding a greater propensity for metabolic adverse effects in the latter. The UK government organization NICE recently revised its recommendation favoring atypicals, to advise that the choice should be an individual one based on the particular profiles of the individual drug and on the patient's preferences.

The re-evaluation of the evidence has not necessarily slowed the bias toward prescribing the atypicals.

== Other uses ==
Antipsychotics, such as risperidone, quetiapine, and olanzapine, have been used as hallucinogen antidotes or "trip killers" to block the effects of serotonergic psychedelics like psilocybin and lysergic acid diethylamide (LSD).

== Adverse effects ==
=== By rate ===
Common (≥ 1% and up to 50% incidence for most antipsychotic drugs) adverse effects of antipsychotics include:

- Dysphoria and apathy (due to dopamine receptor blockade)
- Sedation (particularly common with asenapine, clozapine, olanzapine, quetiapine, chlorpromazine and zotepine)
- Headaches
- Dizziness
- Diarrhea
- Anxiety
- Extrapyramidal side effects (particularly common with first-generation antipsychotics), which include:
  - Akathisia, an often distressing sense of inner restlessness.
  - Dystonia, an abnormal muscle contraction
  - Pseudoparkinsonism, symptoms that are similar to what people with Parkinson's disease experience, including tremulousness and drooling
- Hyperprolactinaemia (rare for those treated with clozapine, quetiapine and aripiprazole), which can cause:
  - Galactorrhoea, the unusual secretion of breast milk.
  - Gynaecomastia, abnormal growth of breast tissue
  - Sexual dysfunction (in both sexes)
  - Osteoporosis
- Orthostatic hypotension
- Weight gain (particularly prominent with clozapine, olanzapine, quetiapine and zotepine, can be counteracted by starting the drug with metformin)

Antipsychotic medication-induced weight gain (AIWG) is a difficult-to-manage condition. In a meta-analysis analyzing data from 9 studies having more than 40,000 patients with AIWG, use of semaglutide was on an average was associated with 7.37kg weight loss with a good reduction in waist circumference. The occurrence of psychiatric adverse events was lower in semaglutide users.

- Anticholinergic side-effects (common for olanzapine, clozapine; less likely on risperidone) such as:
  - Blurred vision
  - Constipation
  - Dry mouth (although hypersalivation may also occur)
  - Reduced perspiration
  - Cognitive decline and memory impairment
- Tardive dyskinesia appears to be more frequent with high-potency first-generation antipsychotics, such as haloperidol, and tends to appear after chronic and not acute treatment. It is characterized by slow (hence the tardive) repetitive, involuntary and purposeless movements, most often of the face, lips, legs, or torso, which tend to resist treatment and are frequently irreversible. The rate of appearance of TD is about 5% per year of use of antipsychotic drug (whatever the drug used)
- Breast cancer: a systematic review and meta-analysis of observational studies with over 2 million individuals estimated an association between antipsychotic use and breast cancer by over 30%.

Rare/Uncommon (<1% incidence for most antipsychotic drugs) adverse effects of antipsychotics include:

- Blood dyscrasias (e.g., agranulocytosis, leukopenia, and neutropaenia), which is more common in patients on clozapine.
- Metabolic syndrome and other metabolic problems such as type II diabetes mellitus — particularly common with clozapine, olanzapine and zotepine. In American studies African Americans appeared to be at a heightened risk for developing type II diabetes mellitus. Evidence suggests that females are more sensitive to the metabolic side effects of first-generation antipsychotic drugs than males. Metabolic adverse effects appear to be mediated by antagonizing the dopamine D2, the histamine H_{1} and serotonin 5-HT_{2C} receptors and perhaps by interacting with other neurochemical pathways in the central nervous system.
- Neuroleptic malignant syndrome, a potentially fatal condition characterized by:
  - Autonomic instability, which can manifest with tachycardia, nausea, vomiting, diaphoresis, etc.
  - Hyperthermia — elevated body temperature.
  - Mental status change (confusion, hallucinations, coma, etc.)
  - Muscle rigidity
  - Laboratory abnormalities (e.g., elevated creatine kinase, reduced iron plasma levels, electrolyte abnormalities, etc.)
- Pancreatitis
- QT interval prolongation — more prominent in those treated with amisulpride, pimozide, sertindole, thioridazine and ziprasidone.
- Torsades de pointes
- Seizures, particularly in people treated with chlorpromazine and clozapine.
- Thromboembolism
- Myocardial infarction
- Stroke
- Pisa syndrome

Some atypical antipsychotics are associated with considerable weight gain, diabetes, and the risk of metabolic syndrome. Unwanted side effects cause people to stop treatment, resulting in relapses. Antipsychotics can have the side effect of extrapyramidal symptoms. Extrapyramidal symptoms are movement disorders that include dystonia, akathisia, parkinsonism, tremor, and tardive dyskinesia. Risperidone (atypical) has a similar rate of extrapyramidal symptoms to haloperidol (typical). A rare but potentially lethal condition of neuroleptic malignant syndrome (NMS) has been associated with the use of antipsychotics. Through its early recognition, and timely intervention rates have declined. However, an awareness of the syndrome is advised to enable intervention. Very rarely antipsychotics may cause tardive psychosis. Generally, more than one antipsychotic drug should not be used at a time because of increased adverse effects.

=== Clozapine ===
Clozapine is associated with side effects that include weight gain, tiredness, and hypersalivation. More serious adverse effects include seizures, NMS, neutropenia, and agranulocytosis (lowered white blood cell count) and its use needs careful monitoring.

Clozapine is also associated with thromboembolism (including pulmonary embolism), myocarditis, and cardiomyopathy. A systematic review of clozapine-associated pulmonary embolism indicates that this adverse effect can often be fatal, and that it has an early onset, and is dose-dependent. The findings advised the consideration of using a prevention therapy for venous thromboembolism after starting treatment with clozapine, and continuing this for six months. Constipation is three times more likely to occur with the use of clozapine, and severe cases can lead to ileus and bowel ischemia resulting in many fatalities. Very rare clozapine adverse effects include periorbital edema due to several possible mechanisms (e.g., inhibition of platelet-derived growth factor receptors leading to increased vascular permeability, antagonism of renal dopamine receptors with electrolyte and fluid imbalance and immune-mediated hypersensitivity reactions).

However, the risk of serious adverse effects from clozapine is low, and there are the beneficial effects to be gained of a reduced risk of suicide, and aggression. Typical antipsychotics and atypical risperidone can have a side effect of sexual dysfunction. Clozapine, olanzapine, and quetiapine are associated with beneficial effects on sexual functioning helped by various psychotherapies.

=== Long-term effects ===
Adults with schizophrenia have a 21x higher incidence of dementia in the United States by the age of 65, which may be linked to antipsychotic use. Both atypical and typical antipsychotics have a higher hazard ratio for dementia risk. In 2024 testable hypotheses were proposed for the mechanism responsible for cortical thinning till dementia.

Some studies have found decreased life expectancy associated with the use of antipsychotics, and argued that more studies are needed. Antipsychotics may also increase the risk of early death in individuals with dementia. Antipsychotics typically worsen symptoms in people with depersonalisation disorder. Antipsychotic polypharmacy (prescribing two or more antipsychotics at the same time for an individual) is a common practice but not evidence-based or recommended, and there are initiatives to curtail it. Similarly, the use of excessively high doses (often the result of polypharmacy) continues despite clinical guidelines and evidence indicating that it is usually no more effective but is usually more harmful. A meta-analysis of observational studies with over two million individuals has suggested a moderate association of antipsychotic use with breast cancer.

Loss of grey matter and other brain structural changes over time are observed amongst people diagnosed with schizophrenia. Meta-analyses of the effects of antipsychotic treatment on grey matter volume and the brain's structure have reached conflicting conclusions. A 2020 study concluded that atypical antipsychotics are linked to cortical thinning and cognitive decline in the mid (20 months) to long-term.

Use of antipsychotics is associated with reductions in brain tissue volumes, including white matter and cortical reduction, an effect which is dose-dependent and time-dependent. However, untreated psychosis is also associated with brain tissue volume reduction. A 2013 meta-analysis published in JAMA Psychiatry confirmed an association between cumulative antipsychotic exposure and progressive brain volume loss (cortical atrophy) in patients with schizophrenia. Despite a global reduction in brain volume noted, a recent controlled trial suggests that second generation antipsychotics combined with intensive psychosocial therapy may potentially prevent volume loss in the globus pallidus in first episode psychosis.

A 2012 meta-analysis concluded that grey matter loss is greater in patients treated with first generation antipsychotics relative to those treated with atypicals, and hypothesized a protective effect of atypicals as one possible explanation. A second 2012 meta-analysis suggested that treatment with antipsychotics was associated with increased grey matter loss. Animal studies found that monkeys exposed to both first- and second-generation antipsychotics experience significant reduction in brain volume, resulting in an 8-11% reduction in brain volume with preserved neuron count and decreased glial cell count over a 17–27 month period.

The National Association of State Mental Health Program Directors said that antipsychotics are not interchangeable, and it recommends including trying at least one weight-neutral treatment for those patients with potential metabolic issues.

Subtle, long-lasting forms of akathisia are often overlooked or confused with post-psychotic depression, in particular when they lack the extrapyramidal aspect that psychiatrists have been taught to expect when looking for signs of akathisia.

Adverse effect on cognitive function and increased risk of death in people with dementia along with worsening of symptoms has been described in the literature.

Antipsychotics, due to acting as dopamine D_{2} receptor antagonists and thereby stimulating pituitary lactotrophs, may have a risk of prolactinoma with long-term use. This is also responsible for their induction of hyperprolactinemia (high prolactin levels).

=== Discontinuation ===
The British National Formulary recommends a gradual withdrawal when discontinuing antipsychotics to avoid acute withdrawal syndrome or rapid relapse. Symptoms of withdrawal commonly include nausea, vomiting, and loss of appetite. Other symptoms may include restlessness, increased sweating, and trouble sleeping. Less commonly there may be a feeling of the world spinning, numbness, or muscle pains.

A randomised controlled trial compared maintenance therapy with gradual dose reduction or discontinuation among people with long-term psychosis. At 2 years, people in the reduction group were twice as likely to relapse (25%) as those in the maintenance group (13%). Moreover, those in the reduction group had no improvement in social functioning (a measure combining people's ability to look after themselves, work, study and take part in family and social activities), side effects, quality of life, symptoms, or bodyweight.

There is evidence that withdrawal syndrome of antipsychotics can result in psychosis. This has occurred in patients who had previously no history of psychosis, but were taking antipsychotics for another reason. Tardive dyskinesia can also occur when the medication is stopped.

Unexpected psychotic episodes have been observed in patients withdrawing from clozapine. This is referred to as supersensitivity psychosis, not to be equated with tardive dyskinesia.

Tardive dyskinesia may abate during withdrawal from the antipsychotic agent, or it may persist.

==== Antipsychotic switching ====
Withdrawal effects may also occur when switching a person from one antipsychotic to another, (it is presumed due to variations of potency and receptor activity). Such withdrawal effects can include cholinergic rebound, an activation syndrome, and motor syndromes including dyskinesias. These adverse effects are more likely during rapid changes between antipsychotic agents, so making a gradual change between antipsychotics minimises these withdrawal effects. The British National Formulary recommends a gradual dose reduction when discontinuing antipsychotic treatment to avoid acute withdrawal symptoms or rapid relapse. The process of cross-titration involves gradually increasing the dose of the new medication while gradually decreasing the dose of the old medication.

== List of agents ==
Chlorpromazine

Haloperidol

Quetiapine

Clinically used antipsychotic medications are listed below by drug group. Trade names appear in parentheses. A 2013 review has stated that the division of antipsychotics into first and second generation is perhaps not accurate.

Notes:

† indicates drugs that are no longer (or were never) marketed in English-speaking countries.

‡ denotes drugs that are no longer (or were never to begin with) marketed in the United States. Some antipsychotics are not firmly placed in either first-generation or second-generation classes.

# denotes drugs that have been withdrawn worldwide.

=== First-generation (typical) ===
==== Butyrophenones ====
- Benperidol^{‡}
- Bromperidol^{†}
- Droperidol^{‡}
- Haloperidol (Haldol)
- Moperone (discontinued)^{†}
- Pipamperone (discontinued)^{†}
- Timiperone ^{†}

==== Diphenylbutylpiperidines ====
- Fluspirilene ‡
- Penfluridol ‡
- Pimozide

==== Phenothiazines ====
- Acepromazine ^{†} — although it is mostly used in veterinary medicine.
- Chlorpromazine (Thorazine)
- Cyamemazine ^{†}
- Dixyrazine ^{†}
- Fluphenazine
- Levomepromazine^{‡}
- Mesoridazine (discontinued)^{†}
- Perazine
- Pericyazine^{‡}
- Perphenazine
- Pipotiazine ^{‡}
- Prochlorperazine
- Promazine (discontinued)
- Promethazine
- Prothipendyl ^{†}
- Thioproperazine^{‡} (only English-speaking country it is available in is Canada)
- Thioridazine (discontinued)
- Trifluoperazine
- Triflupromazine (discontinued)^{†}

==== Thioxanthenes ====
- Chlorprothixene ^{†}
- Clopenthixol
- Flupentixol ^{‡}
- Thiothixene
- Zuclopenthixol ^{‡}

=== Disputed/unknown ===
This category is for drugs that have been called both first and second-generation, depending on the literature being used.

==== Benzamides ====
- Sulpiride ^{‡}
- Sultopride ^{†}
- Veralipride ^{†}

==== Tricyclics ====
- Carpipramine ^{†}
- Clocapramine ^{†}
- Clorotepine ^{†}
- Clotiapine ^{‡}
- Mosapramine ^{†}

==== Others ====
- Molindone ^{#}

=== Second-generation (atypical) ===
==== Benzamides ====
- Amisulpride (Socian) ^{‡} – Selective dopamine antagonist. Higher doses (greater than 400 mg) act upon post-synaptic dopamine receptors resulting in a reduction in the positive symptoms of schizophrenia, such as psychosis. Lower doses, however, act upon dopamine autoreceptors, resulting in increased dopamine transmission, improving the negative symptoms of schizophrenia. Lower doses of amisulpride have also been shown to have antidepressant and anxiolytic effects in non-schizophrenic patients, leading to its use in dysthymia and social phobias.
- Prideperone – Used as an antipsychotic, patented by Ciba-Geigy A.-G. It is a 4'-fluoro-4-piperidinobutyrophenone derivative.
- Monapride ^{†} – Used in Japan.
- Remoxipride ^{#} – Has a risk of causing aplastic anaemia and, hence, has been withdrawn from the market worldwide. It has also been found to possess relatively low (virtually absent) potential to induce hyperprolactinaemia and extrapyramidal symptoms, likely attributable to its comparatively weak binding to (and, hence, rapid dissociation from) the D_{2} receptor.

==== Benzisoxazoles/benzisothiazoles ====
- Iloperidone (Fanapt) – Approved by the US FDA in 2009, it is fairly well tolerated, although hypotension, dizziness, and somnolence were very common side effects. Has not received regulatory approval in other countries, however.
- Milsaperidone (Bysanti) - A prodrug of iloperidone approved in 2026, indicated for the treatment of schizophrenia and the acute management of manic and mixed manic episodes.
- Paliperidone (Invega) – Primary, active metabolite of risperidone that was approved in 2006.
- Perospirone ^{†} – Has a higher incidence of extrapyramidal side effects than other atypical antipsychotics.
- Risperidone (Risperdal) – Divided dosing is recommended until initial titration is completed, at which time the drug can be administered once daily. Used off-label to treat Tourette syndrome and anxiety disorder.
- Ziprasidone (Geodon) – Approved in 2004 to treat bipolar disorder. Side-effects include a prolonged QT interval in the heart, which can be dangerous for patients with heart disease or those taking other drugs that prolong the QT interval.
- Lurasidone (Latuda) – Approved by the US FDA for schizophrenia and bipolar depression, and for use as schizophrenia treatment in Canada.

==== Butyrophenones ====
- Melperone ^{†} – Only used in a few European countries. No English-speaking country has licensed it to date.
- Lumateperone (Caplyta)

==== Tricyclics ====
- Asenapine (Saphris) – Of the dibenzo-oxepino pyrrole class of atypical antipsychotics. Used for the treatment of schizophrenia and acute mania associated with bipolar disorder.
- Clozapine (Clozaril) – Of the dibenzodiazepine class of atypical antipsychotics. Requires routine laboratory monitoring of complete blood counts every one to four weeks due to the risk of agranulocytosis. It has unparalleled efficacy in the treatment of treatment-resistant schizophrenia.
- Loxapine (Adasuve, Loxitane, Loxapac)- Of the dibenzoxazepines class of atypical antipsychotic. Uniquely among all antipsychotics, loxapine's major metabolite is Amoxapine, a tricyclic antidepressant (sometimes classified as tetracyclic antidepressant on its own right. Loxapine is said to have antidepressant properties through amoxapine, which acts, like other tricyclic antidepressant, as a serotonin–norepinephrine reuptake inhibitor. Both loxapine and amoxapine possess significant binding affinity for dopamine receptors D2 receptors but they possess a much stronger affinity with 5-HT2A receptor and 5-HT2C receptor than with any of the dopamine receptors, which makes loxapine an atypical antipsychotic (even though it is sometimes mislabeled as a typical antipsychotic), along of its antidepressant properties through amoxapine, further emphasizes loxapine's unique therapeutic properties, both in regard of its antipsychotic properties and its antidepressants properties, which may be beneficial for treating concurrent psychotic and mood disorders, namely schizophrenia, depressive disorders (including atypical, neurotic, endogenous, reactive or psychotic depression), bipolar disorder, schizoaffective disorder, acute anxiety, agitation, or insomnia.
- Olanzapine (Zyprexa) – Of the theienobenzodiazepine class of atypical antipsychotics. Used to treat psychotic disorders including schizophrenia, acute manic episodes, and maintenance of bipolar disorder. Used as an adjunct to antidepressant therapy, either alone or in combination with fluoxetine as Symbyax.
- Quetiapine (Seroquel) – Of the dibenzothiazepine class of atypical antipsychotics. Used primarily to treat bipolar disorder and schizophrenia. Also used and licensed in a few countries (including Australia, the United Kingdom and the United States) as an adjunct to antidepressant therapy in patients with major depressive disorder. It's the only antipsychotic that's demonstrated efficacy as a monotherapy for the treatment of major depressive disorder and bipolar disorder (it treats mixed mood swings alone). It indirectly serves as a norepinephrine reuptake inhibitor by means of its active metabolite, norquetiapine.
- Zotepine – Of the dibenzothiepin class of atypical antipsychotic indicated for acute and chronic schizophrenia. It is still used in Japan and was once used in Germany but it was discontinued.^{†}

==== Others ====
- Blonanserin – Approved by the PMDA in 2008. Used in Japan and South Korea.
- Pimavanserin – A selective 5-HT_{2A} receptor antagonist approved for the treatment of Parkinson's disease psychosis in 2016.
- Sertindole ^{‡} – Developed by the Danish pharmaceutical company H. Lundbeck. Like the other atypical antipsychotics, it is believed to have antagonist activity at dopamine and serotonin receptors in the brain.

=== Third-generation ===
Third generation antipsychotics are recognized as demonstrating D_{2} receptor partial agonism as opposed to the D_{2} and 5HT-_{2A} receptor antagonism of second-generation (atypical) antipsychotics and D2 antagonism of first-generation (typical) antipsychotics.

==== Butyrophenone(s) ====
- Lumateperone (Caplyta) – In December 2019, lumateperone, a presynaptic D_{2} receptor partial agonist and postsynaptic D_{2} receptor antagonist, received its first global approval in the US for the treatment of schizophrenia in adults. In 2020 and 2021 FDA approved for depressive episodes associated with bipolar I or II disorder in adults, as monotherapy and as adjunctive therapy with lithium or valproate.

==== Phenylpiperazines/quinolinones/benzoxazinones ====
- Aripiprazole (Abilify) - Partial agonist at the D_{2} receptor. Considered the prototypical third-generation antipsychotic.
- Aripiprazole lauroxil (Abilify Maintena) – Long-acting version of aripiprazole for injection.
- Brexpiprazole (Rexulti) – Partial agonist of the D_{2} receptor. Successor of aripiprazole.
- Brilaroxazine – A D_{2/3/4} and 5-HT_{1A} partial agonist and 5-HT_{2A/2B/7} antagonist
- Cariprazine (Vraylar, Reagila) – A D_{3}-preferring D_{2/3} partial agonist.

=== Muscarinic agonists ===
- Xanomeline/trospium chloride (Cobenfy) - A fixed-dose combination of xanomeline and trospium chloride. Xanomeline is a functionally selective muscarinic M_{4} and M_{1} receptor agonist. Trospium chloride is a peripherally-acting non-selective muscarinic antagonist. Xanomeline/trospium chloride was approved for medical use in the United States in September 2024.

== Mechanism of action ==
Antipsychotic drugs such as haloperidol and chlorpromazine tend to block dopamine D_{2} receptors in the dopaminergic pathways of the brain. This means that dopamine released in these pathways has less effect. Excess release of dopamine in the mesolimbic pathway has been linked to psychotic experiences. Decreased dopamine release in the prefrontal cortex, and excess dopamine release in other pathways, are associated with psychotic episodes in schizophrenia and bipolar disorder.

In addition to the antagonistic effects of dopamine, antipsychotics (in particular atypical antipsychotics) also antagonize 5-HT_{2A} receptors. Different alleles of the 5-HT_{2A} receptor have been associated with schizophrenia and other psychoses, including depression. Higher concentrations of 5-HT_{2A} receptors in cortical and subcortical areas, in particular in the right caudate nucleus have been historically recorded.

Typical antipsychotics are not particularly selective and also block dopamine receptors in the mesocortical pathway, tuberoinfundibular pathway, and the nigrostriatal pathway. Blocking D_{2} receptors in these other pathways is thought to produce some unwanted side effects that the typical antipsychotics can produce (see above).

Antipsychotics were commonly classified on a spectrum of low potency to high potency, where potency referred to the ability of the drug to bind to dopamine receptors, and not to the effectiveness of the drug. High-potency antipsychotics such as haloperidol, in general, have doses of a few milligrams and cause less sleepiness and calming effects than low-potency antipsychotics such as chlorpromazine and thioridazine, which have dosages of several hundred milligrams. The latter have a greater degree of anticholinergic and antihistaminergic activity, which can counteract dopamine-related side-effects.

Atypical antipsychotic drugs have a similar blocking effect on D_{2} receptors; however, most also act on serotonin receptors, especially 5-HT_{2A} and 5-HT_{2C} receptors. Both clozapine and quetiapine appear to bind just long enough to elicit antipsychotic effects but not long enough to induce extrapyramidal side effects and prolactin hypersecretion. 5-HT_{2A} antagonism increases dopaminergic activity in the nigrostriatal pathway, leading to a lowered extrapyramidal side effect liability among the atypical antipsychotics.

Xanomeline/trospium chloride was approved for medical use in the United States in September 2024. It was the first antipsychotic to not act on D_{2} receptors. The mechanism of action instead relies on xanomeline's functional selectivity for the M1 and M4 muscarinic receptors, with trospium chloride, a peripherally selective antimuscarinic added to counteract xanomeline's unwanted peripheral muscarinic effects.

== Comparison of medications ==
Overview

Generic name	Class	Type	Brand name(s)	Launch	Developer/Originator(s)	Refs
Amisulpride	Benzamide	Disputed	Solian	1986	Sanofi-Synthélabo	
Aripiprazole	Phenylpiperazine/Quinolinone	Atypical	Abilify	2002	Otsuka/Bristol-Myers Squibb	
Aripiprazole lauroxil	Phenylpiperazine/Quinolinone	Atypical	Aristada	2015	Alkermes	
Asenapine	Tricyclic/Dibenzoxapinopyrrole	Atypical	Saphris/Sycrest	2009	Organon/Merck	
Benperidol	Butyrophenone	Typical	Anquil	1966	Janssen	
Blonanserin	Pyridinylpiperazine	Atypical	Lonasen	2008	Sumitomo Dainippon/Mitsubishi Tanabe	
Brexpiprazole	Phenylpiperazine/Quinolinone	Atypical	Rexulti	2015	Otsuka/Lundbeck	
Bromperidol	Butyrophenone	Typical	Impromem	1981	Janssen	
Cariprazine	Phenylpiperazine	Atypical	Vraylar/Reagila	2015	Gedeon Richter/Actavis	
Carpipramine	Tricyclic/Dibenzazepine	Disputed	Defecton/Prazinil	1977	Pierre Fabre	
Chlorpromazine	Tricyclic/Phenothiazine	Typical	Thorazine	1952	Rhône-Poulenc/GlaxoSmithKline	
Chlorprothixene	Tricyclic/Thioxanthene	Disputed	Truxal	1959	Roche	
Clocapramine	Tricyclic/Dibenzazepine	Disputed	Clofekton/Padrasen	1974	Yoshitomi	
Clopenthixol	Tricyclic/Thioxanthene	Typical	Sordinol/Ciatyl	1961	Lundbeck	
Clorotepine	Tricyclic/Dibenzothiepin	Disputed	Clotepin	1971	Spofa	
Clotiapine	Tricyclic/Dibenzothiazepine	Disputed	Etumine	1966	Sandoz/Wander	
Clozapine	Tricyclic/Dibenzodiazepine	Atypical	Clozaril	1972	Sandoz-Novartis	
Cyamemazine	Tricyclic/Phenothiazine	Disputed	Tercian	1972	Aventis	
Droperidol	Butyrophenone	Typical	Dridol/Droleptan/Inapsine	1963	Janssen-Cilag	
Flupentixol	Tricyclic/Thioxanthene	Typical	Fluanxol	1965	Lundbeck	
Fluphenazine	Tricyclic/Phenothiazine	Typical	Prolixin	1959	Bristol-Myers Squibb	
Fluspirilene	Diphenylbutylpiperidine	Typical	Imap	1970	Janssen	
Haloperidol	Butyrophenone	Typical	Haldol	1959	Janssen	
Iloperidone	Benzisoxazole	Atypical	Fanapt	2010	Novartis	
Levomepromazine	Tricyclic/Phenothiazine	Disputed	Nozinan/Levoprome	1957	Rhône-Poulenc	
Levosulpiride	Benzamide	Disputed	Levopraid	1987	Abbott	
Loxapine	Tricyclic/Dibenzoxazepine	Atypical	Loxitane/Loxapac	1975	Wyeth	
Lumateperone	Pyridopyrroloquinoxaline and Butyrophenone	Atypical	Caplyta	2019	Intra-Cellular Therapies/Bristol-Myers Squibb	
Lurasidone	Benzisothiazole	Atypical	Latuda	2010	Sumitomo Dainippon/Sunovion	
Melperone	Butyrophenone	Disputed	Buronil	1967	Lundbeck	
Mesoridazine	Tricyclic/Phenothiazine	Typical	Serentil	1967	Novartis-Boehringer	
Molindone	Dihydroindolone	Disputed	Moban	1975	Abbott	
Mosapramine	Tricyclic/Dibenzazepine	Disputed	Cremin	1991	Mitsubishi Pharma	
Nemonapride	Benzamide	Disputed	Emilace/Emirace	1991	Yamanouchi	
Olanzapine	Tricyclic/Thienobenzodiazepine	Atypical	Zyprexa	1996	Lilly	
Paliperidone	Benzisoxazole	Atypical	Invega	2007	Janssen-Cilag/Johnson & Johnson	
Paliperidone palmitate	Benzisoxazole	Atypical	Invega Sustenna/Xeplion	2009	Janssen-Cilag/Johnson & Johnson	
Penfluridol	Diphenylbutylpiperidine	Typical	Semap	1973	Janssen	
Perazine	Tricyclic/Phenothiazine	Typical	Taxilan	1958	Promonta	
Periciazine	Tricyclic/Phenothiazine	Typical	Neuleptil/Neulactil	1964	Rhône-Poulenc	
Perospirone	Benzisothiazole	Atypical	Lullan	2001	Sumitomo Dainippon/Mitsubishi Tanabe	
Perphenazine	Tricyclic/Phenothiazine	Typical	Trilafon	1957	Schering-Plough	
Pimavanserin	Dibenzylpiperidinylurea	Atypical	Nuplazid	2016	ACADIA Pharmaceuticals	
Pimozide	Diphenylbutylpiperidine	Typical	Orap	1969	Janssen	
Pipamperone	Butyrophenone	Disputed	Dipiperon	1961	Janssen	
Pipotiazine	Tricyclic/Phenothiazine	Typical	Piportil	1973	Rhône-Poulenc/Aventis	
Prochlorperazine	Tricyclic/Phenothiazine	Typical	Compazine	1956	Rhône-Poulenc/GlaxoSmithKline	
Promazine	Tricyclic/Phenothiazine	Typical	Sparine	1956	Wyeth	
Quetiapine	Tricyclic/Dibenzothiazepine	Atypical	Seroquel	1997	AstraZeneca	
Remoxipride	Benzamide	Disputed	Roxiam	1990	AstraZeneca	
Risperidone	Benzisoxazole	Atypical	Risperdal	1993	Janssen	
Sertindole	Imidazolidinone	Atypical	Serdolect	1996	Lundbeck	
Spiperone	Butyrophenone	Typical	Spiropitan	1969	Eisai	
Sulpiride	Benzamide	Disputed	Dogmatil	1968	Delagrange/Fujisawa	
Sultopride	Benzamide	Disputed	Barnetil	1976	Delagrange/Sanofi-Synthélabo	
Thioridazine	Tricyclic/Phenothiazine	Typical	Melleril	1958	Novartis	
Tiapride	Benzamide	Disputed	Tiapridal	1975	Sanofi-Synthélabo	
Tiotixene	Tricyclic/Thioxanthene	Typical	Navane	1967	Pfizer	
Trifluoperazine	Tricyclic/Phenothiazine	Typical	Stelazine	1958	GlaxoSmithKline	
Triflupromazine	Tricyclic/Phenothiazine	Typical	Vesprin	1957	Bristol-Myers Squibb	
Veralipride	Benzamide	Disputed	Agreal	1980	Sanofi-Synthélabo	
Xanomeline/Trospium chloride	Tetrahydropyridines/Quaternary ammonium	Atypical	Cobenfy	2024	Bristol-Myers	
Ziprasidone	Benzisothiazole	Atypical	Geodon	2000	Pfizer	
Zotepine	Tricyclic/Dibenzothiepin	Atypical	Zoleptil	1982	Fujisawa	
Zuclopenthixol	Tricyclic/Thioxanthene	Typical	Clopixol/Cisordinol	1978	Lundbeck	

Tolerability (as propensity for adverse effects)
Generic name	Discontinuation rate (OR with 95% CI)	Anticholinergic effects	Sedation	EPSE	Weight Gain	Metabolic AEs	QTc prolongation (ORs & 95% CIs)	PE	Hypotension	Notes (e.g., notable AEs*)
Amisulpride	0.43 (0.32–0.57)	-	-	+	+	+/-	+++ 0.66 (0.39–0.91)	+++/++	-	Torsades de Pointes common on overdose. Has a comparatively low penetrability of the blood–brain barrier.
Amoxapine	?	++	++	+/-	++/+	++/+	++/+	++/+	++/+	Amoxapine is also an antidepressant. Very toxic in overdose due to the potential for renal failure and seizures.
Aripiprazole	0.61 (0.51–0.72)	-	+	+/- (akathisia mostly)	+	+/-	- 0.01 (−0.13 to 0.15)	- (can reduce prolactin levels)	-	Only clinically utilised antipsychotic that does not act by antagonising the D_{2} receptor and rather partially agonises this receptor.
Asenapine	0.69 (0.54–0.86)	-	++	+	+	+/-	++/+ 0.30 (−0.04 to 0.65)	+	+	Oral hypoesthesia. Has a complex pharmacologic profile.
Blonanserin	~0.7	+	+	++/+	+/-	+/-	-	++/+	+/-	Only used in a few East Asian countries.
Chlorpromazine	0.65 (0.5–0.84)	+++	+++	++	++	++	++	+++	+++	First marketed antipsychotic, sort of the prototypical low-potency first-generation (typical) antipsychotic.
Clozapine	0.46 (0.32–0.65)	+++	+++	-	+++	+++	+	-	+++	Notable AEs: Agranulocytosis, neutropaenia, leukopaenia and myocarditis. Dose-dependent seizure risk. Overall the most effective antipsychotic, on average. Usually reserved for treatment-resistant cases or highly suicidal patients.
Droperidol	?	+/-	+/-	+++	+/-	+/-	?	+++	?	Mostly used for postoperative nausea and vomiting.
Flupenthixol	?	++	+	++	++	++	+	+++	+	Also used in lower doses for depression.
Fluphenazine	0.69 (0.24–1.97)	++	+	+++	+	+	+	+++	+	High-potency first-generation (typical) antipsychotic.
Haloperidol	0.8 (0.71–0.90)	+	+	+++	+	+/-	+ 0.11 (0.03–0.19)	+++	+	Prototypical high-potency first-generation (typical) antipsychotic.
Iloperidone	0.69 (0.56–0.84)	-	+/-	+	++	++	++ 0.34 (0.22–0.46)	++/+	+	?
Levomepromazine	?	+++	+++	++/+	++	++	?	+++	+++	Also used as an analgesic, agitation, anxiety and emesis.
Loxapine	0.52 (0.28–0.98)	+	++	+++	+	+/-	?	+++	++	Loxapine, through being metabolized into amoxapine which is tricyclic antidepressant, holds a particular for treating conccurent schizophrenia and mood disorders (both bipolar disorder and MDD)
Lurasidone	0.77 (0.61–0.96)	-	-	++/+	-	-	- −0.10 (−0.21 to 0.01)	++/+	-	May be particularly helpful in ameloriating the cognitive symptoms of schizophrenia, likely due to its 5-HT_{7} receptor.
Melperone	?	-	+/-	-	+/-	+/-	++	-	++/+	Several smaller low-quality clinical studies have reported its efficacy in the treatment of treatment-resistant schizophrenia. Only approved for use in a few European countries. It is known that off-licence prescribing of melperone is occurring in the United Kingdom. Is a butyrophenone, low-potency atypical antipsychotic that has been tried as a treatment for Parkinson's disease psychosis, although with negative results.
Molindone	?	-	++/+	+	-	-	?	+++	+/-	Withdrawn from the market. Seems to promote weight loss (which is rather unusual for an antipsychotic seeing how they tend to promote weight gain).
Olanzapine	0.46 (0.41–0.52)	+	++	+	+++	+++	+ 0.22 (0.11–0.31)	+	+	?
Paliperidone	0.48 (0.39–0.58)	-	-	++/+ (dose dependent)	++	+	– 0.05 (−0.18 to 0.26)	+++	++	Active metabolite of risperidone.
Perazine	0.62 (0.4–1.10)	?	?	?	?	?	?	?	?	Limited data available on adverse effects.
Periciazine	?	+++	+++	+	++	+	?	+++	++	Also used to treat severe anxiety. Not licensed for use in the US.
Perospirone	?	+/-	+	++/+	+/-	?	-	++/+	-	Usually grouped with the atypical antipsychotics despite its relatively high propensity for causing extrapyramidal side effects.
Perphenazine	0.30 (0.04–2.33)	+	+	+++	+	+	+	+++	+	Has additional antiemetic effects.
Pimozide	1.01 (0.30–3.39)	+	+	+	+	+	+++	+++	+	High potency first-generation (typical) antipsychotic.
Pipotiazine	?	++	++	++	++	+	?	+++	++	Only available in the UK.
Prochlorperazine	?	?	?	+++	?	?	+	+++	?	Primarily used in medicine as an antiemetic.
Quetiapine	0.61 (0.52–0.71)	++/+	++	-	++	++/+	+ 0.17 (0.06–0.29)	-	++	Binds to the D_{2} receptor in a hit and run fashion. That is it rapidly dissociates from said receptor and hence produces antipsychotic effects but does not bind to the receptor long enough to produce extrapyramidal side effects and hyperprolactinaemia.
Remoxipride	?	-	+/-	-	+/-	+/-	-	-	-	Removed from the market amidst concerns about an alarmingly high rate of aplastic anaemia.
Risperidone	0.53 (0.46–0.60)	-	++/+ (dose-dependent)	++	++	++/+	++ 0.25 (0.15–0.36)	+++	++	?
Sertindole	0.78 (0.61–0.98)	-	-	-	++	++/+	+++ 0.90 (0.76–1.02)	-	+++	Not licensed for use in the US.
Sulpiride	1.00 (0.25–4.00)	-	-	+	+	+/-	+	+++/++	-	Not licensed for use in the US.
Thioridazine	0.67 (0.32–1.40)	+++	+++	+	++	++	+++	+++	+++	Dose-dependent risk for degenerative retinopathies. Found utility in reducing the resistance of multidrug and even extensively resistant strains of tuberculosis to antibiotics.
Tiotixene	?	-	+	+++	++	++/+	+	+++	+	?
Trifluoperazine	0.94 (0.59–1.48)	+/-	+	+++	+	+/-	?	+++	+	?
Ziprasidone	0.72 (0.59–0.86)	-	++	+	-	-	++ 0.41 (0.31–0.51)	++/+	+	?
Zotepine	0.69 (0.41–1.07)	+	+++	++	+++/++	+++/++	++	+++	++	Dose-dependent risk of seizures. Not licensed for use in the US.
Zuclopenthixol	?	++	++	+++	++	++	?	+++	+	Not licensed for use in the US.
Note: "Notable" is to mean side-effects that are particularly unique to the antipsychotic drug in question. For example, clozapine is notorious for its ability to cause agranulocytosis. If data on the propensity of a particular drug to cause a particular AE is unavailable an estimation is substituted based on the pharmacologic profile of the drug. Acronyms used: AE – Adverse effect OR – Odds ratio CI – Confidence Interval EPSE – Extrapyramidal Side Effect QTc – Corrected QT interval PE – Prolactin elevation Legend: very low propensity for this AE; + low propensity/severity for this AE ++ moderate propensity/severity for this AE +++ high propensity/severity for this AE

Generic drug name	Schizophrenia	Mania	Bipolar depression	Bipolar maintenance	Adjunct in major depression
Amisulpride	+++	?	?	?	? (+++ in dysthymia)
Aripiprazole	++	++	-	++ (prevents manic and mixed but not depressive episodes)	+++
Asenapine	++/+	++	?	++	?
Chlorpromazine	++	?	?	?	?
Clozapine	+++	+++	+++	+++	+++
Haloperidol	++	+++	?	?	?
Iloperidone	+	?	?	?	?
Loxapine	+++/++	+++ (only in the treatment of agitation)	+++(through being metabolized into Amoxapine)	++/+++	+++(through being metabolized into Amoxapine)
Lurasidone	+	?	+++	?	?
Melperone	+++	?	?	?	?el
Olanzapine	+++	+++/++	++	++	++
Paliperidone	++	+++/++	?	?	?
Perospirone	+	?	?	?	?
Quetiapine	++	++	+++	+++	++
Risperidone	+++	+++	-	++	+++
Sertindole	++	?	?	?	?
Ziprasidone	++/+	+	?	+	?
Zotepine	++	?	?	?	?

Binding affinity

K_{i} [nM] toward cloned human receptors (unless otherwise specified) (Note: Bolded drug names indicate drugs that are metabolites of clinically-marketed antipsychotics.)
Drug name	SERT	NET	5-HT_{1A}	5-HT_{2A}	5-HT_{2C}	5-HT_{6}	5-HT_{7}	α_{1A}	α_{2A}	α_{2C}	D_{1}	D_{2}	D_{3}	D_{4}	5-HT_{2A}/D_{2}	H_{1}	M_{1}	M_{3}
Amisulpride	>10,000	>10,000	>10,000	8,304	>10,000	4,154	73.5	>10,000	1,114	1,540	>10,000	2.2	2.4	2,370	3774.5	>10,000	>10,000	>10,000
Aripiprazole	1,081	2091.5	5.6	8.7	22.4	642.4	9.97	25.85	74.1	37.63	1,173.5	1.64	5.35	514	5.3	27.93	6,778	4,678
Asenapine	ND	ND	2.5	0.06	0.03	0.25	0.13	1.2	1.2	1.2	1.4	1.3	0.42	1.1	0.0462	1.0	8,128	8,128
Blonanserin	ND	ND	804	0.812	26.4	41.9	183	26.7 (RB)	530 (RC)	ND	1,070	0.142	0.494	150	5.72	765	100	ND
Brexpiprazole	ND	ND	0.12	0.47	ND	58	3.7	3.8	15	0.59	160	0.3	1.1	6.3	1.567	19	ND	>10,000
N-DEBN	ND	ND	ND	1.28	4.50	5.03	206 (RC)	ND	ND	ND	1,020	1.38	0.23	ND	0.93	ND	ND	ND
Brilaroxazine	107	ND	1.5	2.5	39	51	2.7	ND	ND	ND	100	0.40	3.7	6.0		ND	ND	ND
Cariprazine	ND	ND	2.6	18.8	134	ND	111	155	ND	ND	ND	0.085	0.49	ND		21	>1,000	>1,000
Chlorpromazine	1,296	2,443	2,115.5	4.5	15.6	17.0	28.4	0.28	184	46	76.3	1.40	4.65	5.33	3.21	3.09	32.3	57.0
Clozapine	1,624	3,168	123.7	5.35	9.44	13.5	17.95	1.62	37	6.0	266.3	157	269.1	26.4	0.0341	1.13	6.17	19.25
Norclozapine	316.6	493.9	13.9	10.9	11.9 (RC)	11.6	60.1	104.8	137.6	117.7	14.3	94.5	153	63.94	0.115	3.4	67.6	95.7
cis-Flupenthixol	ND	ND	8,028	87.5 (HFC)	102.2 (RC)	ND	ND	ND	ND	ND	3.5	0.35	1.75	66.3	250	0.86	ND	ND
Fluphenazine	5,950	3,076	1,039.9	37.93	982.5	34.67	8.00	6.45	314.1	28.9	17.33	0.30	1.75	40.0	126.4	14.15	1,095	1,441
Haloperidol	3,256	2,112	2,066.83	56.81	4,801	5,133	377.6	12.0	801.5	403	121.8	0.7	3.96	2.71	81.2	1698	>10,000	>10,000
Iloperidone	ND	1479	93.21	1.94	147	63.09	112	0.3	160	16.2	129.32	10.86	10.55	13.75	0.179	12	4,898	>10,000
Loxapine	>10,000	5,698	2,456	6.63	13.25	31.0	88	31.0	150.9	80.0	54	28.1	19.33	7.80	0.236	4.90	119.45	211.33
Amoxapine	58	16	ND	0.5	2.0 (RC)	50	40.21	50	151	80	ND	20.8	21.0	21.0	0.0240	25	1,000	1,000
Lumataperone	62	ND	ND	0.54	ND	ND	ND	ND	ND	ND	52	32	ND	ND		ND	ND	ND
Lurasidone	ND	ND	6.8	2.0	415	ND	0.5	48	1.6	10.8	262	1.7	ND	ND	1.18	>10,000	>10,000	>10,000
Melperone	ND	ND	2,200 (HB)	230	2,100 (HB)	1,254 (RC)	578 (HB)	180 (HB)	150 (HB)	ND	ND	194	8.95	555	1.186	580	>10,000	>10,000
Molindone	ND	ND	3,797	3773	>10,000	1,008	3,053	2,612	1,097	172.6	ND	6.0	72.5	2,950	628.83	2,130	ND	>10,000
Olanzapine	3,676	>10,000	2282	3.73	10.2	8.07	105.2	112	314	28.9	70.33	34.23	47.0	14.33	0.109	2.19	2.5	56.33
Pivamanserin	ND	ND	ND	0.087	0.44	ND	ND	>300	>300	>300	>300	>300	>300	>300		>300	>300	>300
Paliperidone	3,717	>10,000	616.6	0.71	48	2,414	2.7	2.5	17.35	7.35	41.04	0.7	0.5	54.3	1.104	18.8	>10,000	>10,000
Perphenazine	ND	ND	421	5.6	132	17	23	10	810.5	85.2	ND	0.14	0.13	17	40	8	1,500	1,848
Pimozide	ND	842	650	48.35	2,112	71	0.5	197.7	1,593	376.5	>10,000	1.45	0.25	1.8	33.34	692.2	800 (HB)	1,955
Prochlorperazine	ND	600	5,900 (HC)	15 (HC)	122	148 (RC)	196 (RC)	23.8 (HB)	1,694.91 (HB)	ND	ND	0.65	2.90	5.40	23.1	18.86 (HB)	555.55 (HB)	ND
Quetiapine	>10,000	>10,000	394.2	912	1,843	948.75	307.6	22	3,630	28.85	994.5	379	340	2,019	2.41	6.90	489	1631.5
Norquetiapine	ND	12	45	48	107	ND	76	144	237	ND	99.8 (RC)	196	ND	ND	0.245	3.5	38.3 (RC)	ND
Risperidone	>10,000	>10,000	422.88	0.17	12	2057.17	6.6	5	16.5	1.3	243.53	3.57	2.0	4.66	0.0476	20.05	>10,000	>10,000
Sertindole	ND	ND	280	0.39	0.9	5.4	28	1.8	640	450	ND	2.35	2.30	4.92	0.166	130	>5,000	2,692
Sulpiride	ND	ND	>10,000	>10,000 (RC)	>10,000 (RC)	5,000 (RC)	4,000 (RC)	>10,000 (RB)	4,893 (RB)	ND	>10,000	9.80	8.05	54	>1,000	>10,000 (RB)	>10,000 (RB)	>10,000 (RB)
Thioridazine	1,259	842	144.35	27.67	53	57.05	99	3.15	134.15	74.9	94.5	2.20	1.50	6.00	12.58	16.5	12.8	29
Tiotixene	3,878	>10,000	410.2	50	1355.5	245.47	15.25	11.5	79.95	51.95	51	0.12	0.40	203	416.7	8	>10,000	>10,000
Trifluoperazine	ND	ND	950	74	378	144	290.8	24	653.7	391.5	ND	1.12	ND	38.1	66.07	63	ND	1,001
Xanomeline	>10,000	1,630	63	126	40	1,259	126	2020	1000	1000	ND	1,000	398	ND		398	7.9	7.8
Ziprasidone	112	44	54.67	0.73	13	60.95	6.31	18	160	68	30	4.35	7.85	52.9	0.1678	62.67	>10,000	>10,000
Zotepine	151	530	470.5	2.7	3.2	6	12	7	208	106	71	25	6.4	18	0.108	3.21	18	73
Acronyms used: HFC – Human frontal cortex receptor RB – Rat brain receptor RC – Cloned rat receptor ND – No data HB – Human brain receptor HC – Human cortex receptor N-DEBN – N-desethylblonanserin

Pharmacokinetics

Drug	Bioavailability	t_{1/2} parent drug (active metabolite)	Protein binding	t_{max}	C_{max}	V_{d}	Excretion	Routes	Metabolism enzymes	Active metabolites
Amisulpride	48%	12 h	16%	3–4 h	54 ± 4 ng/mL	5.8 L/kg	Faeces (20%), urine (50%, when given IV)	Oral	?	None
Aripiprazole	87% (Oral), 100% (IM)	75 h (94 h)	99%	3–5 h	?	4.9 L/kg	Faeces (55%), urine (25%)	Oral, IM (including depot)	CYP2D6, CYP3A4	Dehydroaripiprazole
Asenapine	35% (sublingual)	24 h	95%	0.5–1.5 h	4 ng/mL	20–25 L/kg	Urine (50%), faeces (40%)	Sublingual	CYP1A2, UGT1A4, CYP2D6	None
Blonanserin	55%	10.7–16.2 h (single dosing), 67.9 h (repeated dosing)	≥ 99.7%	1.5–2 h	0.14–0.76 ng/mL (0.57 ng/mL for repeated dosing)	8560–9500 L	Urine (59%), faeces (30%)	Oral	CYP3A4	N-desethylblonanserin
Chlorpromazine	20%	30 h	92–97%	?	?	20 L/kg	Urine	Oral, IM, IV	CYP2D6	Several active metabolites
Clozapine	50–60%	12 h	97%	1.5–2.5 h	102–771 ng/mL	4.67 L/kg	Urine (50%), faeces (30%)	Oral	CYP1A2, CYP2D6, CYP3A4	Norclozapine
Droperidol	?	2 h (8–12 h)	Extensive	60 min (IM)	?	2 L/kg (adults), 0.58 L/kg (children)	Urine (75%), faeces (22%)	IM, IV	?	None
Flupentixol	40–55% (Oral)	35 h	?	7 days (depot)	?	12–14 L/kg	Urine	Oral, IM (including depot)	?	None
Fluphenazine	2.7% (Oral)	14–16 h, 14 days (depot)	?	2 h (Oral), 8–10 h (depot)	?	?	Urine, faeces	Oral, IM (including depot)	?	None
Haloperidol	60–70% (Oral)	10–20 h (short-acting IM), 3 weeks (depot)	92%	2–6 h (Oral), 10–20 min (short-acting IM), 6–7 days (depot)	?	8–18 L/kg	Urine (30%), faeces (15%)	Oral, IM, IV	CYP3A4	None
Iloperidone	96%	?	95%	2–4 h	?	1340–2800 L	Urine (45–58%), faeces (20–22%)	Oral	CYP3A4, CYP2D6	None notable.
Levomepromazine	?	30 h	?	2–3 h	?	?	Urine, faeces	IM, IV	?	Methotrimeprazine sulfoxide
Loxapine	High	6–8 h (Inhaled), 4–12 h (Oral)	96.6%	2 min (inhaled), 2 h (oral), 5 h (IM)	257 ng/mL (inhaled), 6–13 ng/mL (Oral)	?	Urine (56–70%), faeces [Only oral data available]	Oral, IM, Inhalation	CYP1A2, CYP3A4, CYP2D6	Amoxapine (a tricyclic antidepressant), 7-OH loxapine, 8-OH loxapine
Lurasidone	9–19%	18 h	99%	1–3 h	?	6173 L	Urine (9%), faeces (80%)	Oral	CYP3A4	2 active
Melperone	54% (Oral via syrup), 65% (Oral via tablets), 87% (IM)	2.1–6.4 h (Oral), 6.6 ± 3.7 h (IM)	50%	1.6–2.4 h (Oral, tablets), 1 h (Oral, syrup)	1132 ± 814 ng/mL (25 mg, orally), 2228–3416 ng/mL (50 mg, orally), 89539 ± 37001 ng/mL (100 mg, orally)	9.9 ± 3.7 L/kg (10 mg), 7 ± 1.61 L/kg (20 mg)	Urine (70% as metabolites, 5.5–10.4% as parent drug)	Oral, IM	?	None
Olanzapine	87% (Oral)	30 h	93%	6 h (Oral), 15–45 min (short-acting IM), 7 days (depot)	4–20.4 mg/mL	1000 L	Urine (57%), faeces (30%)	Oral, IM (including depot)	CYP1A2	None
Paliperidone	28% (Oral)	23 h (Oral), 25–49 days (IM)	74%	24 h (Oral), 13 days (IM)	8.85–11.7 ng/mL	390–487 L	Urine (80%), faeces (11%)	Oral, IM (depot)	CYP3A4, CYP2D6	None
Periciazine	?	12 h	?	2 h	150 ng/mL	?	Urine	Oral	?	?
Perospirone	?	1.9–2.5 h	92%	1.5 h	5.7 ng/mL	?	Urine (0.4% as unchanged drug)	Oral	?	None
Perphenazine	?	9–12 h (10–19 h)	?	1–3 h; 2–4 h (metabolite)	0.984 ng/mL; 0.509 ng/mL	?	Urine, faeces	Oral	CYP2D6	7-OH perphenazine
Pimozide	40–50%	55 h	?	6–8 h	4–19 ng/mL (dose-dependent)	?	Urine	Oral	CYP3A4, CYP2D6	None
Prochlorperazine	12.5%	6.8–9 h	High	?	?	12.9–17.7 L/h	Urine, bile	Oral, IM, IV	?	N-desmethylprochlorperazine
Quetiapine	100%	6 h (IR), 7 h (XR); active metabolite: 12 h	83%	1.5 h (IR), 6 h (XR)	@ 250 mg q8hr 778 ng/mL (male), 879 ng/mL (female)	6–14 L/kg	Urine (73%), faeces (20%)	Oral	CYP3A4	Norquetiapine (a norepinephrine reuptake inhibitor and 5-HT_{1A} receptor partial agonist)
Risperidone	70%	3–17 h (24 h)	90% (active metabolite: 77%)	3–17 h	?	1–2 L/kg	Urine (70%), faeces (14%)	Oral, IM (including depot)	CYP2D6	Paliperidone
Sertindole	?	3 days	99.5%	10 h	?	20 L/kg	Urine (4%), faeces (46–56%)	Oral	CYP2D6	None
Sulpiride	27 ± 9%	8 h	40%	3-6 h	?	2.72 ± 0.66 L/kg	Urine, faeces	Oral	?	None
Thioridazine	?	24 h	95%	?	?	?	?	Oral	CYP2D6	None
Tiotixene	?	24 h	90%	?	?	?	?	Oral	CYP1A2	None
Trifluoperazine	?	24 h	?	?	?	?	?	Oral	?	None
Xanomeline	~1%	5h	95%	2h	?	10,800 Liters	Urine (78%), Faeces (12%)	Oral	CYP2D6, CYP2B6, CYP1A2, CYP2C9, CYP2C19 FMO1, FMO3	None
Ziprasidone	60% (Oral), 100% (IM)	7 h (Oral), 2–5 h (IM)	99%	6–8 h (Oral), ≤ 60 min (IM)	?	1.5 L/kg	Faeces (66%), urine (20%)	Oral, IM	CYP3A4, CYP1A2	None
Zotepine	7–13%	13.7–15.9 h (12 h)	97%	1-4 h	31–240	10 L/kg	Urine (17%)	Oral	CYP1A2, CYP3A4	Norzotepine (a norepinephrine reuptake inhibitor)
Zuclopenthixol	49%	20 h	98%	2–12 h (mean: 4 h)	?	20 L/kg	Faeces, urine (10%)	Oral, IM (including depot)	CYP2D6	None

Pharmacokinetics of long-acting injectable antipsychotics
Medication	Brand name	Class	Vehicle	Dosage	T_{max}	t_{1/2} single	t_{1/2} multiple	logP^{c}	Ref
Aripiprazole lauroxil	Aristada	Atypical	Water^{a}	441–1064 mg/4–8 weeks	24–35 days	?	54–57 days	7.9–10.0	
Aripiprazole monohydrate	Abilify Maintena	Atypical	Water^{a}	300–400 mg/4 weeks	7 days	?	30–47 days	4.9–5.2	
Bromperidol decanoate	Impromen Decanoas	Typical	Sesame oil	40–300 mg/4 weeks	3–9 days	?	21–25 days	7.9	
Clopentixol decanoate	Sordinol Depot	Typical	Viscoleo^{b}	50–600 mg/1–4 weeks	4–7 days	?	19 days	9.0	
Flupentixol decanoate	Depixol	Typical	Viscoleo^{b}	10–200 mg/2–4 weeks	4–10 days	8 days	17 days	7.2–9.2	
Fluphenazine decanoate	Prolixin Decanoate	Typical	Sesame oil	12.5–100 mg/2–5 weeks	1–2 days	1–10 days	14–100 days	7.2–9.0	
Fluphenazine enanthate	Prolixin Enanthate	Typical	Sesame oil	12.5–100 mg/1–4 weeks	2–3 days	4 days	?	6.4–7.4	
Fluspirilene	Imap, Redeptin	Typical	Water^{a}	2–12 mg/1 week	1–8 days	7 days	?	5.2–5.8	
Haloperidol decanoate	Haldol Decanoate	Typical	Sesame oil	20–400 mg/2–4 weeks	3–9 days	18–21 days		7.2–7.9	
Olanzapine pamoate	Zyprexa Relprevv	Atypical	Water^{a}	150–405 mg/2–4 weeks	7 days	?	30 days	–	
Oxyprothepin decanoate	Meclopin	Typical	?	?	?	?	?	8.5–8.7	
Paliperidone palmitate	Invega Sustenna	Atypical	Water^{a}	39–819 mg/4–12 weeks	13–33 days	25–139 days	?	8.1–10.1	
Perphenazine decanoate	Trilafon Dekanoat	Typical	Sesame oil	50–200 mg/2–4 weeks	?	?	27 days	8.9	
Perphenazine enanthate	Trilafon Enanthate	Typical	Sesame oil	25–200 mg/2 weeks	2–3 days	?	4–7 days	6.4–7.2	
Pipotiazine palmitate	Piportil Longum	Typical	Viscoleo^{b}	25–400 mg/4 weeks	9–10 days	?	14–21 days	8.5–11.6	
Pipotiazine undecylenate	Piportil Medium	Typical	Sesame oil	100–200 mg/2 weeks	?	?	?	8.4	
Risperidone	Risperdal Consta	Atypical	Microspheres	12.5–75 mg/2 weeks	21 days	?	3–6 days	–	
Zuclopentixol acetate	Clopixol Acuphase	Typical	Viscoleo^{b}	50–200 mg/1–3 days	1–2 days	1–2 days		4.7–4.9	
Zuclopentixol decanoate	Clopixol Depot	Typical	Viscoleo^{b}	50–800 mg/2–4 weeks	4–9 days	?	11–21 days	7.5–9.0	
Note: All by intramuscular injection. Footnotes: ^{a} = Microcrystalline or nanocrystalline aqueous suspension. ^{b} = Low-viscosity vegetable oil (specifically fractionated coconut oil with medium-chain triglycerides). ^{c} = Predicted, from PubChem and DrugBank. Sources: Main: See template.

== History ==
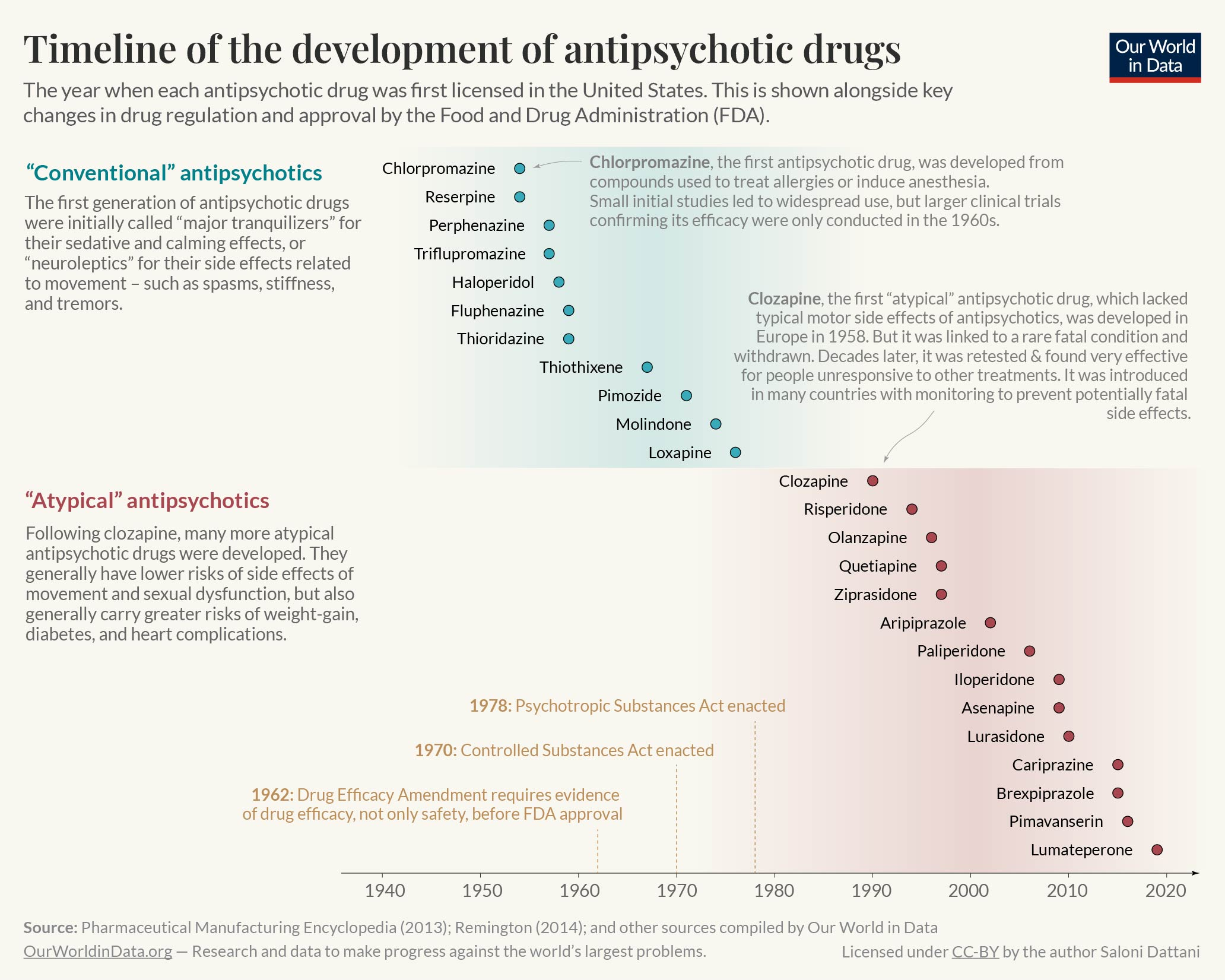
Timeline of the development of antipsychotic drugs

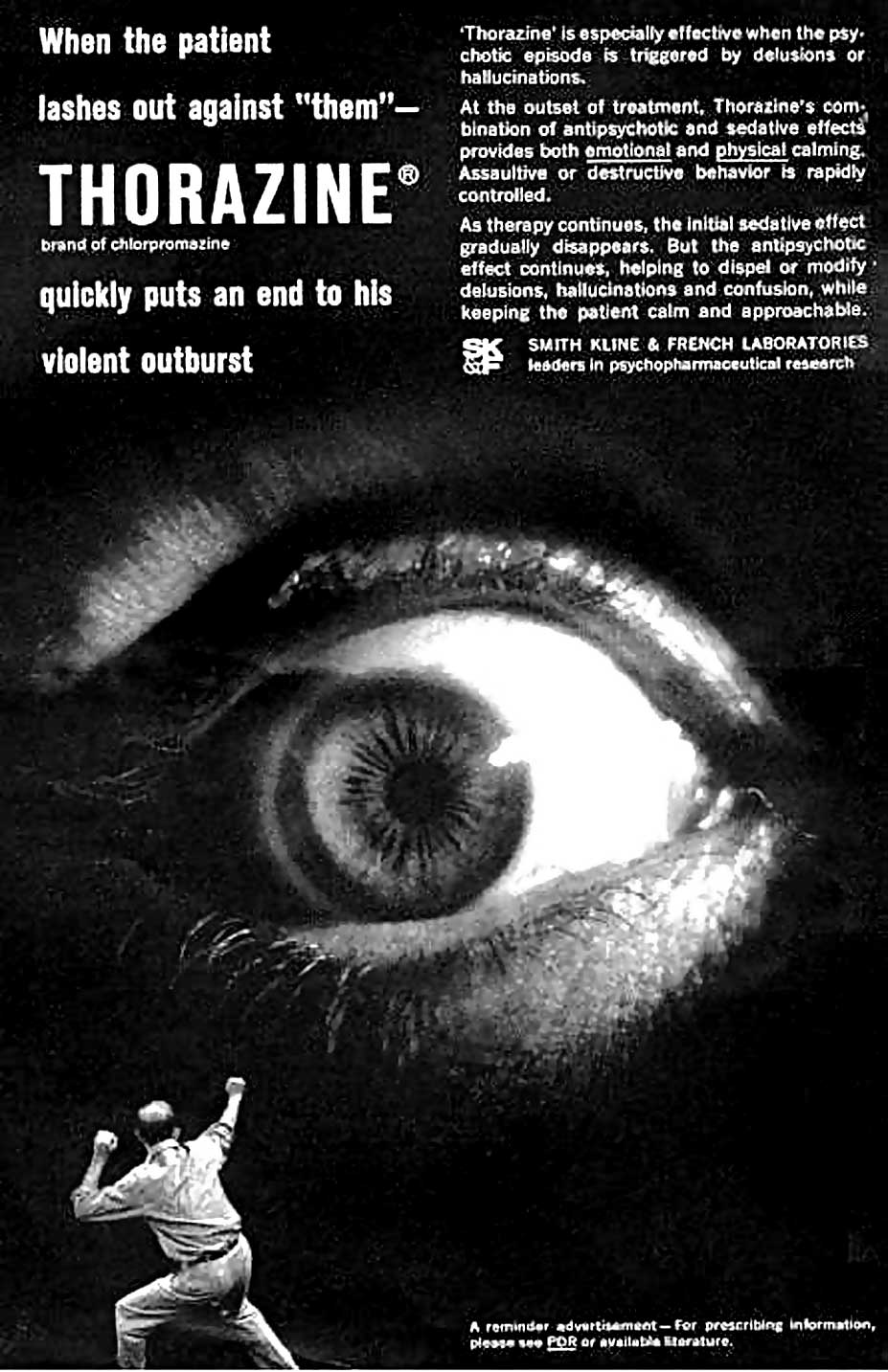
Advertisement for Thorazine (chlorpromazine) from the 1950s, reflecting the perceptions of psychosis, including the now-discredited perception of a tendency towards violence, from the time when antipsychotics were discovered

The original antipsychotic drugs were happened upon largely by chance and then tested for their effectiveness. The first, chlorpromazine, was developed as a surgical anesthetic. It was first used on psychiatric patients because of its powerful calming effect; at the time it was regarded as a non-permanent "pharmacological lobotomy". Lobotomy at the time was used to treat many behavioral disorders, including psychosis, although its effect was to markedly reduce behavior and mental functioning of all types. However, chlorpromazine proved to reduce the effects of psychosis in a more effective and specific manner than lobotomy, even though it was known to be capable of causing severe sedation. The underlying neurochemistry involved has since been studied in detail, and subsequent antipsychotic drugs have been developed by rational drug design.

The discovery of chlorpromazine's psychoactive effects in 1952 led to further research that resulted in the development of antidepressants, anxiolytics, and the majority of other drugs now used in the management of psychiatric conditions. In 1952, Henri Laborit described chlorpromazine only as inducing indifference towards what was happening around them in nonpsychotic, nonmanic patients, and Jean Delay and Pierre Deniker described it as controlling manic or psychotic agitation. The former claimed to have discovered a treatment for agitation in anyone, and the latter team claimed to have discovered a treatment for psychotic illness.

Until the 1970s there was considerable debate within psychiatry on the most appropriate term to use to describe the new drugs. In the late 1950s the most widely used term was "neuroleptic", followed by "major tranquilizer" and then "ataraxic". The first recorded use of the term tranquilizer dates from the early nineteenth century. In 1953 Frederik F. Yonkman, a chemist at the Swiss-based Cibapharmaceutical company, first used the term tranquilizer to differentiate reserpine from the older sedatives.

The word neuroleptic was coined in 1955 by Delay and Deniker after their discovery (1952) of the antipsychotic effects of chlorpromazine. It is derived from the Greek: "νεῦρον" (neuron, originally meaning "sinew" but today referring to the nerves) and "λαμβάνω" (lambanō, meaning "take hold of"). Thus, the word means taking hold of one's nerves. It was often taken to refer also to common side effects such as reduced activity in general, as well as lethargy and impaired motor control. Although these effects are unpleasant and in some cases harmful, they were at one time, along with akathisia, considered a reliable sign that the drug was working.

The term "ataraxy" was coined by the neurologist Howard Fabing and the classicist Alister Cameron to describe the observed effect of psychic indifference and detachment in patients treated with chlorpromazine. This term derived from the Greek adjective "ἀτάρακτος" (ataraktos), which means "not disturbed, not excited, without confusion, steady, calm". In the use of the terms "tranquilizer" and "ataractic", medical practitioners distinguished between the "major tranquilizers" or "major ataractics", which referred to drugs used to treat psychoses, and the "minor tranquilizers" or "minor ataractics", which referred to drugs used to treat neuroses.

While popular during the 1950s, these terms are infrequently used today. They are being abandoned in favor of "antipsychotic", which refers to the drug's desired effects. Today, "minor tranquilizer" can refer to anxiolytic and/or hypnotic drugs such as the benzodiazepines and nonbenzodiazepines, which are useful as generally short-term management for insomnia together with cognitive behavioral therapy for insomnia. They are potentially addictive sedatives.

Antipsychotics are broadly divided into two groups, the typical or first-generation antipsychotics and the atypical or second-generation antipsychotics. The difference between first- and second-generation antipsychotics is a subject of debate. The second-generation antipsychotics are generally distinguishable by the presence of 5HT2A receptor antagonism and a corresponding lower propensity for extrapyramidal side effects compared to first-generation antipsychotics.

== Society and culture ==
=== Terminology ===
The term major tranquilizer was used for older antipsychotic drugs. The term neuroleptic is often used as a synonym for antipsychotic, even though – strictly speaking – the two terms are not interchangeable. Antipsychotic drugs are a subgroup of neuroleptic drugs, because the latter have a wider range of effects.

Antipsychotics are a type of psychoactive or psychotropic medication.

=== Sales ===
Antipsychotics were once among the biggest selling and most profitable of all drugs, generating $22 billion in global sales in 2008. By 2003 in the US, an estimated 3.21 million patients received antipsychotics, worth an estimated $2.82 billion. Over 2/3 of prescriptions were for the newer, more expensive atypicals, each costing on average $164 per year, compared to $40 for the older types. By 2008, sales in the US reached $14.6 billion, the biggest selling drugs in the US by therapeutic class.

In the five years since July 2017 the number of antipsychotic medicines dispensed in the community in the United Kingdom has increased by 11.2%. There have also been substantial price rises. Risperidone 6 mg tablets, the largest, increased from £3.09 in July 2017 to £41.16 in June 2022. The NHS is spending an additional £33 million annually on antipsychotics. Haloperidol 500 microgram tablets constituted £14.3 million of this.

=== Overprescription ===
Antipsychotics in the nursing home population are often overprescribed, often for the purposes of making it easier to handle dementia patients. Federal efforts to reduce the use of antipsychotics in US nursing homes has led to a nationwide decrease in their usage in 2012.

City and Hackney Clinical Commissioning Group found more than 1,000 patients in their area in July 2019 who had not had regular medication reviews or health checks because they were not registered as having serious mental illness. On average they had been taking these drugs for six years. If this is typical of practice in England more than 100,000 patients are probably in the same position.

=== Legal ===
Antipsychotics are sometimes administered as part of compulsory psychiatric treatment via inpatient (hospital) commitment or outpatient commitment.

=== Formulations ===
They may be administered orally or, in some cases, through long-acting (depot) injections administered in the dorsgluteal, ventrogluteal or deltoid muscle. Short-acting parenteral formulations also exist, which are generally reserved for emergencies or when oral administration is otherwise impossible. The oral formulations include immediate release, extended release, and orally disintegrating products (which are not sublingual, and can help ensure that medications are swallowed instead of "cheeked"). Sublingual products (e.g., asenapine) also exist, which must be held under the tongue for absorption. The first transdermal formulation of an antipsychotic (transdermal asenapine, marketed as Secuado), was FDA-approved in 2019.

=== Recreational use ===
Certain second-generation antipsychotics are misused or abused for their sedative, tranquilizing, and (paradoxically) "hallucinogenic" effects. The most commonly implicated second-generation antipsychotic is quetiapine. In case reports, quetiapine has been abused in doses taken by mouth (which is how the drug is available from the manufacturer), but also crushed and insufflated or mixed with water for injection into a vein. Olanzapine, another sedating second-generation antipsychotic, has also been misused for similar reasons. There is no standard treatment for antipsychotic abuse, though switching to a second-generation antipsychotic with less abuse potential (e.g., aripiprazole) has been used.

=== Controversy ===
Use of this class of drugs has a history of criticism in residential care. As the drugs used can make patients calmer and more compliant, critics claim that the drugs can be overused. Outside doctors can feel under pressure from care home staff. In an official review commissioned by UK government ministers it was reported that the needless use of antipsychotic medication in dementia care was widespread and was linked to 1800 deaths per year. In the US, the government has initiated legal action against the pharmaceutical company Johnson & Johnson for allegedly paying kickbacks to Omnicare to promote its antipsychotic risperidone (Risperdal) in nursing homes.

There has also been controversy about the role of pharmaceutical companies in marketing and promoting antipsychotics, including allegations of downplaying or covering up adverse effects, expanding the number of conditions or illegally promoting off-label usage; influencing drug trials (or their publication) to try to show that the expensive and profitable newer atypicals were superior to the older cheaper typicals that were out of patent.

Following charges of illegal marketing, settlements by two large pharmaceutical companies in the US set records for the largest criminal fines ever imposed on corporations. One case involved Eli Lilly and Company's antipsychotic Zyprexa, and the other involved Bextra. In the Bextra case, the government also charged Pfizer with illegally marketing another antipsychotic, Geodon.

In addition, AstraZeneca faces numerous personal-injury lawsuits from former users of Seroquel (quetiapine), amidst federal investigations of its marketing practices. By expanding the conditions for which they were indicated, Astrazeneca's Seroquel and Eli Lilly's Zyprexa had become the biggest selling antipsychotics in 2008 with global sales of $5.5 billion and $5.4 billion respectively.

Harvard University medical professor Joseph Biederman conducted research on bipolar disorder in children that led to an increase in such diagnoses. A 2008 Senate investigation found that Biederman also received $1.6 million in speaking and consulting fees between 2000 and 2007, some of them undisclosed to Harvard, from companies including makers of antipsychotic drugs prescribed for children with bipolar disorder. Johnson & Johnson gave more than $700,000 to a research center that was headed by Biederman from 2002 to 2005, where research was conducted, in part, on Risperdal, the company's antipsychotic drug. Biederman has responded saying that the money did not influence him and that he did not promote a specific diagnosis or treatment.

Pharmaceutical companies have also been accused of attempting to set the mental health agenda through activities such as funding consumer advocacy groups.

Joanna Moncrieff has argued that antipsychotic drug treatment is often undertaken as a means of control rather than to treat specific symptoms experienced by the patient.

== Special populations ==
It is recommended that persons with dementia who exhibit behavioral and psychological symptoms should not be given antipsychotics before trying other treatments. When taking antipsychotics this population has increased risk of cerebrovascular effects, parkinsonism or extrapyramidal symptoms, sedation, confusion and other cognitive adverse effects, weight gain, and increased mortality.

Physicians and caretakers of persons with dementia should try to address symptoms including agitation, aggression, apathy, anxiety, depression, irritability, and psychosis with alternative treatments whenever antipsychotic use can be replaced or reduced. Elderly persons often have their dementia treated first with antipsychotics and this is not the best management strategy.

== See also ==
- Atypical antipsychotic
- List of antipsychotics
- List of investigational antipsychotics
