= Fluphenazine =

Typical antipsychotic medication

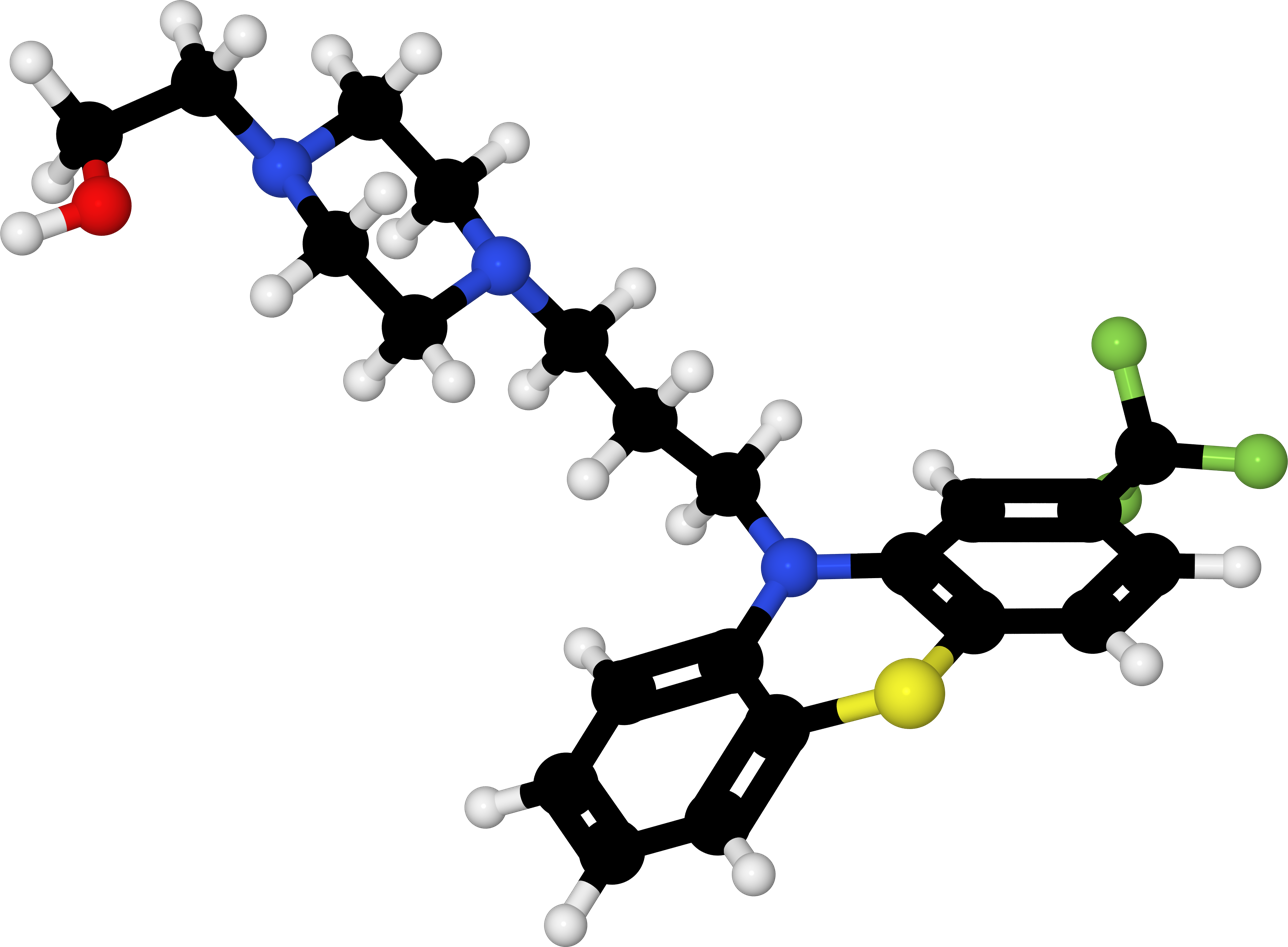

Clinical data
- Trade names: Prolixin, Modecate, Moditen others
- AHFS/Drugs.com: Monograph
- MedlinePlus: a682172
- License data: US DailyMed: Fluphenazine
- Pregnancy category: AU: C
- Routes of administration: By mouth, Intramuscular injection, depot injection (fluphenazine decanoate)
- Drug class: Typical antipsychotic
- ATC code: N05AB02 (WHO)

Legal status
- Legal status: BR: Class C1 (Other controlled substances); CA: ℞-only; UK: POM (Prescription only); US: ℞-only

Pharmacokinetic data
- Bioavailability: 2.7% (by mouth)
- Metabolism: unclear
- Elimination half-life: IM 15 hours (HCl), 7–10 days (decanoate)
- Excretion: Urine, feces

Identifiers
- IUPAC name: 2-[4-[3-[2-(trifluoromethyl)-10H-phenothiazin-10-yl]propyl]piperazin-1-yl]ethanol
- CAS Number: 69-23-8
- PubChem CID: 3372
- IUPHAR/BPS: 204
- DrugBank: DB00623
- ChemSpider: 3255
- UNII: S79426A41Z
- KEGG: D07977
- ChEBI: CHEBI:5123
- ChEMBL: ChEMBL726
- CompTox Dashboard (EPA): DTXSID2023068
- ECHA InfoCard: 100.000.639

Chemical and physical data
- Formula: C_{22}H_{26}F_{3}N_{3}OS
- Molar mass: 437.53 g·mol^{−1}
- 3D model (JSmol): Interactive image
- SMILES: FC(F)(F)c2cc1N(c3c(Sc1cc2)cccc3)CCCN4CCN(CCO)CC4
- InChI: InChI=1S/C22H26F3N3OS/c23-22(24,25)17-6-7-21-19(16-17)28(18-4-1-2-5-20(18)30-21)9-3-8-26-10-12-27(13-11-26)14-15-29/h1-2,4-7,16,29H,3,8-15H2; Key:PLDUPXSUYLZYBN-UHFFFAOYSA-N

Fluphenazine, sold under the brand name Prolixin among others, is a high-potency typical antipsychotic medication of the phenothiazine class. It is used in the treatment of chronic psychoses such as schizophrenia, and is about equal in effectiveness to low-potency antipsychotics like chlorpromazine. It is also used to treat depression in combination with nortriptyline. In addition to the oral form, fluphenazine comes in decanoate and enanthate depot injection versions for increased adherence. Fluphenazine is given by mouth, intramuscularly, or just under the skin.

Common side effects include movement problems, sleepiness, depression and increased weight. Serious side effects may include neuroleptic malignant syndrome, low white blood cell levels, and the potentially permanent movement disorder tardive dyskinesia. In older people with psychosis as a result of dementia it may increase the risk of dying. It may also increase prolactin levels which may result in milk production, enlarged breasts in males, impotence, and the absence of menstrual periods. It is unclear if it is safe for use in pregnancy. Fluphenazine decanoate should not be used by people with severe depression. In up to 40% of those on long term phenothiazines, liver function tests become mildly abnormal.

Fluphenazine is a dopamine antagonist, blocking mesolimbic dopamine receptors. Fluphenazine inhibits tubulin polymerization, a property shared with other phenothiazine derivatives including perphenazine, chlorpromazine, trifluoperazine, and triflupromazine.

Fluphenazine was the third antipsychotic FDA approved in the United States in 1959, and 9 years later was the first FDA approved injectable antipsychotic. The injectable form is on the World Health Organization's List of Essential Medicines. It is available as a generic medication. It was discontinued in Australia in 2017.

== Medical use ==
A 2018 Cochrane review found that fluphenazine was an imperfect treatment and other inexpensive drugs less associated with side effects may be an equally effective choice for people with schizophrenia. Another 2018 Cochrane review found that there was limited evidence that newer atypical antipsychotics were more tolerable than fluphenazine. Intramuscular depot injection forms are available as both the decanoate and enanthate esters.

== Side effects ==
=== Discontinuation ===
The British National Formulary recommends a gradual withdrawal when discontinuing antipsychotics to avoid acute withdrawal syndrome or rapid relapse. Symptoms of withdrawal commonly include nausea, vomiting, and loss of appetite. Other symptoms may include restlessness, increased sweating, and trouble sleeping. Less commonly there may be a feeling of the world spinning, numbness, or muscle pains. Symptoms generally resolve after a short period of time.

There is tentative evidence that discontinuation of antipsychotics can result in psychosis. It may also result in reoccurrence of the condition that is being treated. Rarely tardive dyskinesia can occur when the medication is stopped.

== Pharmacology ==
=== Pharmacodynamics ===
Fluphenazine acts primarily by blocking post-synaptic dopaminergic D_{2} and D_{1} receptors in the basal ganglia, cortical and limbic system. It also blocks α_{1} adrenergic receptors, muscarinic M_{1} receptors, and histaminergic H_{1} receptors, and like other phenothiazines, it competitively inhibits calmodulin. Fluphenazine depresses both the release of hypothalamic and hypophyseal hormones and the reticular activating system.

Binding Affinities of Fluphenazine
Target	K_{i} (nM)	Action
D_{2}	0.89	Antagonist
D_{1}	14.45	Antagonist
5-HT_{2A}	3.8–98	Antagonist
5-HT_{1B}	334	Modulator
5-HT_{2C}	174–2,570	Antagonist
AR	ND	Antagonist
α_{1A}	6.4–9	Antagonist
H_{1}	7.3–70	Antagonist
M_{1}	1,095-3,235.93	Antagonist
Calmodulin	ND	Inhibitor
The smaller the Ki, the more strongly the drug binds to the site. All data are for human cloned proteins, except 5-HT_{3} (rat).

=== Pharmacokinetics ===
Oral fluphenazine rapidly absorbs and plasma levels peak at about 1.0-2.5 ng/mL 2 hours post-ingestion. The volume of distribution is about 298 L due to extensive tissue uptake, and it crosses the blood brain barrier. Bioavailability is low at 2.7% due to first pass metabolism, and the half-life is about 14–16 hours. Steady state concentrations vary considerably across individuals, which indicates variability in absorption, metabolism, or excretion. Additionally, the dose-level relationship is curvilinear with plasma levels of 0.2 - 2.8 ng/mL being optimal for clinical improvement. Fluphenazine is primarily metabolized to fluphenazine sulfoxide by the cytochrome P450 2D6. Benztropine mesylate did not indicate any major drug-drug interactions. Fluphenazine is exreted primarily through urine and feces.

Injectable fluphenazine is dissolved in sesame oil which forms a localized oil depot in the muscle. Due to the lipophilicity of the added decanoate or enanthate group, the drug remains in the oil causing the rate-limiting step for drug being diffusion out, resulting in flip-flop kinetics. Fluphenazine decanoate and enanthate are prodrugs which are hydrolyzed by esterases to fluphenazine. The fluphenazine decanoate acts within 1–3 days, and its effect lasts an average of 2 weeks. The half-life of fluphenazine decanoate is about 6.8-9.6 days, and plasma levels peak at about 2.18 ng/mL about 4–6 hours post injection. Fluphenazine enanthate has a lower half life of about 3.6-3.7 days, reflecting its decreased lipophilicity.

Pharmacokinetics of long-acting injectable antipsychotics
Medication	Brand name	Class	Vehicle	Dosage	T_{max}	t_{1/2} single	t_{1/2} multiple	logP^{c}	Ref
Aripiprazole lauroxil	Aristada	Atypical	Water^{a}	441–1064 mg/4–8 weeks	24–35 days	?	54–57 days	7.9–10.0	
Aripiprazole monohydrate	Abilify Maintena	Atypical	Water^{a}	300–400 mg/4 weeks	7 days	?	30–47 days	4.9–5.2	
Bromperidol decanoate	Impromen Decanoas	Typical	Sesame oil	40–300 mg/4 weeks	3–9 days	?	21–25 days	7.9	
Clopentixol decanoate	Sordinol Depot	Typical	Viscoleo^{b}	50–600 mg/1–4 weeks	4–7 days	?	19 days	9.0	
Flupentixol decanoate	Depixol	Typical	Viscoleo^{b}	10–200 mg/2–4 weeks	4–10 days	8 days	17 days	7.2–9.2	
Fluphenazine decanoate	Prolixin Decanoate	Typical	Sesame oil	12.5–100 mg/2–5 weeks	1–2 days	1–10 days	14–100 days	7.2–9.0	
Fluphenazine enanthate	Prolixin Enanthate	Typical	Sesame oil	12.5–100 mg/1–4 weeks	2–3 days	4 days	?	6.4–7.4	
Fluspirilene	Imap, Redeptin	Typical	Water^{a}	2–12 mg/1 week	1–8 days	7 days	?	5.2–5.8	
Haloperidol decanoate	Haldol Decanoate	Typical	Sesame oil	20–400 mg/2–4 weeks	3–9 days	18–21 days		7.2–7.9	
Olanzapine pamoate	Zyprexa Relprevv	Atypical	Water^{a}	150–405 mg/2–4 weeks	7 days	?	30 days	–	
Oxyprothepin decanoate	Meclopin	Typical	?	?	?	?	?	8.5–8.7	
Paliperidone palmitate	Invega Sustenna	Atypical	Water^{a}	39–819 mg/4–12 weeks	13–33 days	25–139 days	?	8.1–10.1	
Perphenazine decanoate	Trilafon Dekanoat	Typical	Sesame oil	50–200 mg/2–4 weeks	?	?	27 days	8.9	
Perphenazine enanthate	Trilafon Enanthate	Typical	Sesame oil	25–200 mg/2 weeks	2–3 days	?	4–7 days	6.4–7.2	
Pipotiazine palmitate	Piportil Longum	Typical	Viscoleo^{b}	25–400 mg/4 weeks	9–10 days	?	14–21 days	8.5–11.6	
Pipotiazine undecylenate	Piportil Medium	Typical	Sesame oil	100–200 mg/2 weeks	?	?	?	8.4	
Risperidone	Risperdal Consta	Atypical	Microspheres	12.5–75 mg/2 weeks	21 days	?	3–6 days	–	
Zuclopentixol acetate	Clopixol Acuphase	Typical	Viscoleo^{b}	50–200 mg/1–3 days	1–2 days	1–2 days		4.7–4.9	
Zuclopentixol decanoate	Clopixol Depot	Typical	Viscoleo^{b}	50–800 mg/2–4 weeks	4–9 days	?	11–21 days	7.5–9.0	
Note: All by intramuscular injection. Footnotes: ^{a} = Microcrystalline or nanocrystalline aqueous suspension. ^{b} = Low-viscosity vegetable oil (specifically fractionated coconut oil with medium-chain triglycerides). ^{c} = Predicted, from PubChem and DrugBank. Sources: Main: See template.

== Availability ==
The injectable form is on the World Health Organization's List of Essential Medicines. It is available as a generic medication. It was discontinued in Australia in 2017.

== Veterinary ==
In horses, it is sometimes given by injection as an anxiety-relieving medication, though there are many negative common side effects and it is forbidden by many equestrian competition organizations.
