= Melperone =

Antipsychotic drug

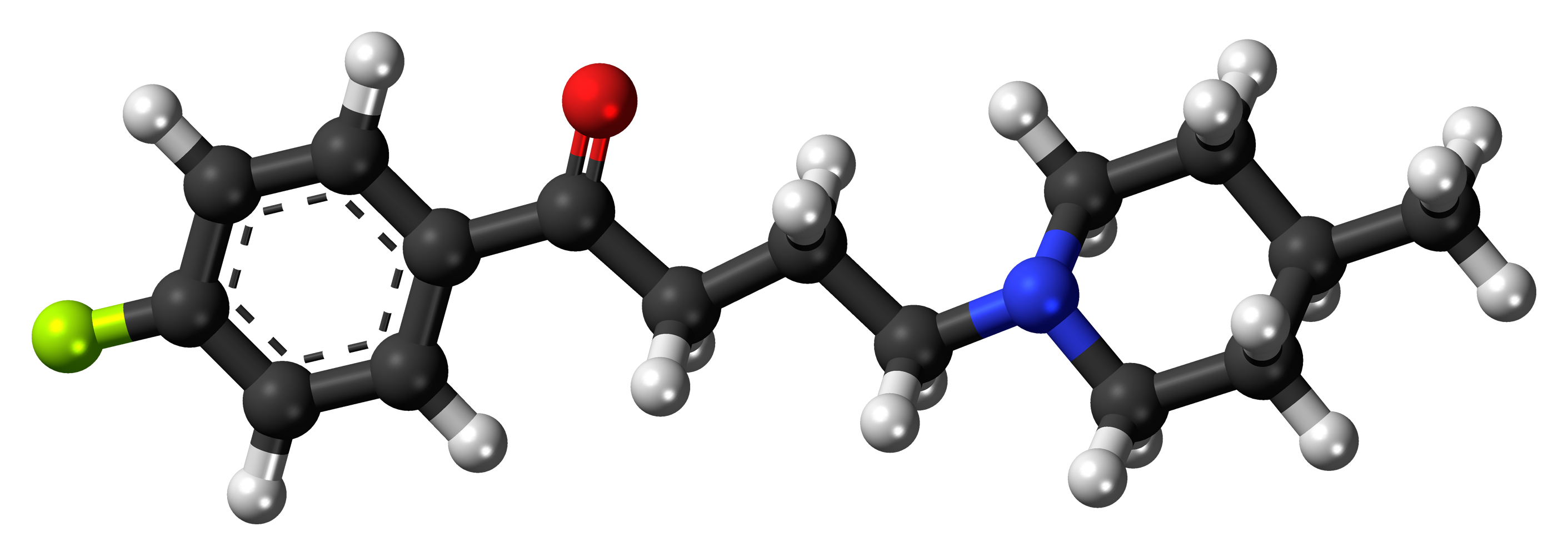

Clinical data
- Trade names: Buronil
- AHFS/Drugs.com: International Drug Names
- Routes of administration: Oral, intramuscular injection
- ATC code: N05AD03 (WHO)

Legal status
- Legal status: In general: ℞ (Prescription only)

Pharmacokinetic data
- Bioavailability: 87% (IM), 54% (Oral via syrup), 65% (Oral, tablet)
- Protein binding: 50%
- Metabolism: Hepatic
- Elimination half-life: 3–4 hours (oral); 6 hours (IM)
- Excretion: Renal (70% as metabolites, 5.5–10.4% as unchanged drug)

Identifiers
- IUPAC name: 1-(4-fluorophenyl)-4-(4-methylpiperidin-1-yl)butan-1-one
- CAS Number: 3575-80-2
- PubChem CID: 15387
- DrugBank: DB09224
- ChemSpider: 14646
- UNII: J8WA3K39B7
- KEGG: D07309
- ChEMBL: ChEMBL1531134
- CompTox Dashboard (EPA): DTXSID0023298
- ECHA InfoCard: 100.107.027

Chemical and physical data
- Formula: C_{16}H_{22}FNO
- Molar mass: 263.356 g·mol^{−1}
- 3D model (JSmol): Interactive image
- SMILES: Fc1ccc(cc1)C(=O)CCCN2CCC(CC2)C
- InChI: InChI=1S/C16H22FNO/c1-13-8-11-18(12-9-13)10-2-3-16(19)14-4-6-15(17)7-5-14/h4-7,13H,2-3,8-12H2,1H3; Key:DKMFBWQBDIGMHM-UHFFFAOYSA-N

Melperone (Bunil (PT), Buronil (AT, BE, CZ, DK, FI^{†}, NL^{†}, NO^{†}, SE), Eunerpan (DE)) is an atypical antipsychotic of the butyrophenone chemical class, making it structurally related to the typical antipsychotic haloperidol. It first entered clinical use in 1960s.

== Marketing and indications ==
It has been tried in treatment-resistant cases of schizophrenia with some (albeit limited) success. It has also been reported effective in the treatment of L-DOPA and other forms of psychosis in Parkinson's disease (although a multicentre, double-blind, placebo-controlled study conducted in 2012 failed to support these findings). It is also known to possess anxiolytic properties. It is marketed in the following countries:

- Austria
- Czech Republic
- Denmark
- Estonia
- Finland
- Germany
- Iceland
- Lithuania
- Latvia
- Portugal
- Sweden

== Adverse effects ==
Melperone is reported to produce significantly less weight gain than clozapine and approximately as much weight gain as typical antipsychotics. It is also purported to produce around as much prolactin secretion as clozapine (which is virtually nil). It is also purported to produce sedative effects and QT interval prolongation. It is also known to produce less extrapyramidal side effects than the first-generation (typical) antipsychotic, thiothixene. It can also produce (usually relatively mild) dry mouth.

Other common adverse effects include

- Constipation
- Diarrhea
- Nausea
- Vomiting
- Appetite loss
- Hypersalivation (drooling)
- Extrapyramidal side effects (e.g. tremor, dystonia, hypokinesis, akathisia, dyskinesias)
- Insomnia
- Agitation
- Headache
- Dizziness
- Fatigue
- Miosis
- Mydriasis
- Blurred vision
- Elevated liver enzymes (esp. ALT and GGTP)

Rare adverse effects include

- Tardive dyskinesia
- Neuroleptic malignant syndrome
- Blood dyscrasias (pancytopenia, agranulocytosis, leukopenia, thrombocytopenia, etc.)

Unknown frequency adverse effects include

- Seizures (probably rare/uncommon)
- Increased intraocular pressure
- Intrahepatic cholestasis (probably rare)
- Orthostatic hypotension (probably common)
- Arrhythmias
- Rash
- Hyperprolactinemia (which can lead to e.g. galactorrhea, gynecomastia)
- Weight gain
- Increased appetite

== Interactions ==
Melperone is reported to be a CYP2D6 inhibitor.

== Pharmacology ==
Melperone binds to the dopamine D_{2} receptor, just like all other clinically utilized antipsychotics, but it does so with a very low affinity and hence may be liable to rapidly dissociate from the D_{2} receptor hence potentially giving it the profile of an atypical antipsychotic.

Receptor	K_{i} [nM]
5-HT_{1A}	2,200
5-HT_{1D}	3,400
5-HT_{2A}	230
5-HT_{2C}	2,100
5-HT_{6}	1,254
5-HT_{7}	578
α_{1}	180
α_{2}	150
M_{1}	>10,000
M_{2}	2,400
M_{3}	>10,000
M_{4}	4,400
M_{5}	>10,000
D_{2}	194
D_{3}	347
D_{4}	555
H_{1}	580

== Synthesis ==
Thieme Patents: 86%:

For the last step of the synthesis the sidechain 4-Chloro-4'-Fluorobutyrophenone [3874-54-2] (1) is attached to 4-Methylpiperidine (4-Pipecoline) [626-58-4] (2).

== See also ==
- Pipamperone
