= Triflupromazine =

Typical antipsychotic medication

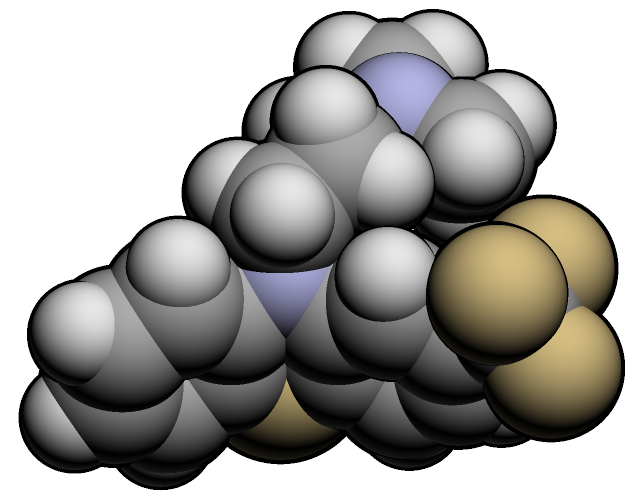

Clinical data
- AHFS/Drugs.com: Micromedex Detailed Consumer Information
- MedlinePlus: a600010
- ATC code: N05AA05 (WHO)

Legal status
- Legal status: US: ℞-only

Identifiers
- IUPAC name: N,N-dimethyl-3-[2-(trifluoromethyl)-10H-phenothiazin-10-yl]propan-1-amine
- CAS Number: 146-54-3
- PubChem CID: 5568
- IUPHAR/BPS: 4330
- DrugBank: DB00508
- ChemSpider: 5367
- UNII: RO16TQF95Y
- KEGG: D00390
- ChEBI: CHEBI:9711
- ChEMBL: ChEMBL570
- CompTox Dashboard (EPA): DTXSID9023704
- ECHA InfoCard: 100.005.158

Chemical and physical data
- Formula: C_{18}H_{19}F_{3}N_{2}S
- Molar mass: 352.42 g·mol^{−1}
- 3D model (JSmol): Interactive image
- SMILES: CN(C)CCCN1c2ccccc2Sc2ccc(cc12)C(F)(F)F
- InChI: InChI=1S/C18H19F3N2S/c1-22(2)10-5-11-23-14-6-3-4-7-16(14)24-17-9-8-13(12-15(17)23)18(19,20)21/h3-4,6-9,12H,5,10-11H2,1-2H3; Key:XSCGXQMFQXDFCW-UHFFFAOYSA-N

Triflupromazine (Vesprin) is an antipsychotic medication of the phenothiazine class. Among different effects of triflupromazine indication for use of this drug is severe emesis and severe hiccups. Due to its potential side effects (triflupromazine has higher risk for side effects than many other antipsychotics) it is not gold standard in antiemetic therapy.

Serious side effects of triflupromazine can be akathisia and tardive dyskinesia as well as the rare, but potentially fatal, neuroleptic malignant syndrome.

It has also been reported to target tubulin, blocking its polymerization.
