= Milsaperidone =

Medication

Clinical data
- Trade names: Bysanti
- Other names: VHX896, VHX-896
- AHFS/Drugs.com: Monograph
- MedlinePlus: a626033
- License data: US DailyMed: Milsaperidone
- Routes of administration: Oral
- Drug class: Atypical antipsychotic
- ATC code: None

Legal status
- Legal status: US: ℞-only

Identifiers
- IUPAC name: (1S)-1-[4-[3-[4-(6-fluoro-1,2-benzoxazol-3-yl)piperidin-1-yl]propoxy]-3-methoxyphenyl]ethanol
- CAS Number: 501373-88-2
- PubChem CID: 10365268
- ChemSpider: 8540717
- UNII: 7SV1ZOG031
- KEGG: D13099

Chemical and physical data
- Formula: C_{24}H_{29}FN_{2}O_{4}
- Molar mass: 428.504 g·mol^{−1}
- 3D model (JSmol): Interactive image
- SMILES: C[C@@H](C1=CC(=C(C=C1)OCCCN2CCC(CC2)C3=NOC4=C3C=CC(=C4)F)OC)O
- InChI: InChI=1S/C24H29FN2O4/c1-16(28)18-4-7-21(23(14-18)29-2)30-13-3-10-27-11-8-17(9-12-27)24-20-6-5-19(25)15-22(20)31-26-24/h4-7,14-17,28H,3,8-13H2,1-2H3/t16-/m0/s1; Key:SBKZGLWZGZQVHA-INIZCTEOSA-N

Milsaperidone, sold under the brand name Bysanti, is a medication used for the treatment of schizophrenia and bipolar disorder. It is an atypical antipsychotic. It is a prodrug of iloperidone and acts as a dopamine D_{2} receptor and serotonin 5-HT_{2A} receptor antagonist, among other actions. Milsaperidone was developed by Vanda Pharmaceuticals.

Milsaperidone was approved for medical use in the United States in February 2026.

== Medical uses ==
Milsaperidone is indicated for the treatment of schizophrenia; and for the acute treatment of manic or mixed episodes associated with bipolar I disorder.

== Society and culture ==
=== Legal status ===
Milsaperidone was approved for medical use in the United States in February 2026.

=== Names ===
Milsaperidone is the international nonproprietary name.

Milsaperidone is sold under the brand name Bysanti.

== Research ==
Milsaperidone is in phase III clinical trials for treatment of major depressive disorder.
