= Extrapyramidal symptoms =

Symptoms associated with the extrapyramidal system of the brain

- Other names: extrapyramidal manifestations; extrapyramidal side effects (EPSE) (when caused by drugs)
- Specialty: Neurology

Extrapyramidal symptoms (EPS) are symptoms that are archetypically associated with the extrapyramidal system of the brain. When such symptoms are caused by medications or other drugs, they are also known as extrapyramidal side effects (EPSE). The symptoms can be acute (short-term) or chronic (long-term). They include movement dysfunction such as dystonia (continuous spasms and muscle contractions), akathisia (may manifest as motor restlessness), parkinsonism characteristic symptoms such as rigidity, bradykinesia (slowness of movement), tremor, and tardive dyskinesia (irregular, jerky movements). Extrapyramidal symptoms are a reason why subjects drop out of clinical trials of antipsychotics; of the 213 (14.6%) subjects that dropped out of one of the largest clinical trials of antipsychotics (the CATIE trial [Clinical Antipsychotic Trials for Intervention Effectiveness], which included 1460 randomized subjects), 58 (27.2%) of those discontinuations were due to EPS.

== Causes ==
=== Medications ===
Extrapyramidal symptoms are most commonly caused by typical antipsychotic drugs that antagonize dopamine D_{2} receptors. The most common typical antipsychotics associated with EPS are haloperidol and fluphenazine. Atypical antipsychotics have lower D_{2} receptor affinity or higher serotonin 5-HT_{2A} receptor affinity which lead to lower rates of EPS.

Other anti-dopaminergic drugs, like the antiemetic metoclopramide, can also result in extrapyramidal side effects. Short and long-term use of antidepressants such as selective serotonin reuptake inhibitors (SSRI), serotonin-norepinephrine reuptake inhibitors (SNRI), and norepinephrine-dopamine reuptake inhibitors (NDRI) have also resulted in EPS. Specifically, duloxetine, sertraline, escitalopram, fluoxetine, and bupropion have been linked to the induction of EPS.

=== Non-medication-related ===
Other causes of extrapyramidal symptoms can include brain damage and meningitis. However, the term "extrapyramidal symptoms" generally refers to medication-induced causes in the field of psychiatry.

== Diagnosis ==
Since it is difficult to measure extrapyramidal symptoms, rating scales are commonly used to assess the severity of movement disorders. The Simpson-Angus Scale (SAS), Barnes Akathisia Rating Scale (BARS), Abnormal Involuntary Movement Scale (AIMS), and Extrapyramidal Symptom Rating Scale (ESRS) are rating scales frequently used for such assessment and are not weighted for diagnostic purposes; these scales can help clinicians weigh the benefit/expected benefit of a medication against the degree of distress which the side effects are causing the patient, aiding in the decision to maintain, reduce, or discontinue the causative medication(s).

== Classification ==
- Acute dystonic reactions: painful, muscular spasms of neck, jaw, back, extremities, eyes, throat, and tongue; highest risk in young men.
  - Oculogyric crisis is a kind of acute dystonic reaction that involves the prolonged involuntary upward deviation of the eyes.
- Akathisia: A feeling of internal motor restlessness that can present as tension, nervousness, or anxiety. Clinical manifestations include pacing and an inability to sit still.
- Pseudoparkinsonism: drug-induced parkinsonism (rigidity, bradykinesia, tremor, masked facies, shuffling gait, stooped posture, sialorrhoea, and seborrhoea; greater risk in the elderly). Although Parkinson's disease is primarily a disease of the nigrostriatal pathway and not the extrapyramidal system, loss of dopaminergic neurons in the substantia nigra leads to dysregulation of the extrapyramidal system. Since this system regulates posture and skeletal muscle tone, a result is the characteristic bradykinesia of Parkinson's.
- Tardive dyskinesia: involuntary muscle movements in the lower face and distal extremities; this can be a chronic condition associated with long-term use of antipsychotics.

== Treatment ==
Medications are used to reverse the symptoms of extrapyramidal side effects caused by antipsychotics or other drugs, by either directly or indirectly increasing dopaminergic neurotransmission. The treatment varies by the type of the EPS, but may involve anticholinergic agents such as procyclidine, benztropine, diphenhydramine, and trihexyphenidyl. Certain medications such as dopamine agonists are not used, as they may worsen psychotic symptoms to those taking neuroleptic drugs.

If the EPS are induced by an antipsychotic, EPS may be reduced by decreasing the dose of the antipsychotic or by switching from a typical antipsychotic to an (or to a different) atypical antipsychotic, such as aripiprazole, ziprasidone, quetiapine, olanzapine, risperidone, or clozapine. These medications possess an additional mode of action that is believed to mitigate their effect on the nigrostriatal pathway, which means they are associated with fewer extrapyramidal side-effects than "conventional" antipsychotics (chlorpromazine, haloperidol, etc.)

=== Dystonia ===
Anticholinergic medications are used to reverse acute dystonia. If the symptoms are particularly severe, the anticholinergic medication may be administered by injection into a muscle to rapidly reverse the dystonia.

=== Akathisia ===
Certain second-generation antipsychotics, such as lurasidone and the partial D2-agonist aripiprazole, are more likely to cause akathisia compared to other second-generation antipsychotics. If akathisia occurs, switching to an antipsychotic with a lower risk of akathisia may improve symptoms. Beta blockers (like propranolol) are frequently used to treat akathisia. Other medications that are sometimes used include clonidine, mirtazapine, or even benzodiazepines. Anticholinergic medications are not helpful for treating akathisia.

=== Pseudoparkinsonism ===
Medication interventions are generally reserved for cases in which withdrawing the medication that caused the pseudoparkinsonism is either ineffective or infeasible. Anticholinergic medications are sometimes used to treat pseudoparkinsonism, but they can be difficult to tolerate when given chronically. Amantadine is sometimes used as well. It is rare for dopamine agonists to be used for antipsychotic-induced EPS, as they may exacerbate psychosis.

=== Tardive dyskinesia ===
When other measures fail or are not feasible, medications are used to treat tardive dyskinesia. These include the vesicular monoamine transporter 2 inhibitors tetrabenazine and deutetrabenazine.

== History ==
Extrapyramidal symptoms (also called extrapyramidal side effects) get their name because they are symptoms of disorders in the extrapyramidal system, which regulates posture and skeletal muscle tone. This is in contrast to symptoms originating from the pyramidal tracts.

== See also ==
- Neuroleptic malignant syndrome
- Rabbit syndrome
