= List of adverse effects of lurasidone =

This is a list of adverse effects of the antipsychotic drug lurasidone, sorted by frequency of occurrence.

== Very common ==
Very common (>10% incidence) adverse effects include:

- Somnolence^{†} (produces an intermediate degree of sedation compared to other atypical antipsychotics)
- Akathisia^{†}
- Fasting glucose increased^{†}
- Nausea^{†}
- Parkinsonism^{†}
- Insomnia^{†}

^{†} These are dose-dependent.

== Common ==
Common (1–10% incidence) adverse effects include:

- Vomiting^{†}
- Dyspepsia^{†}
- Agitation^{†}
- Anxiety^{†}
- Dystonia
- Dizziness^{†}
- Fatigue
- Back pain^{†}
- Restlessness
- Hypersalivation^{†}
- Weight gain^{†}

^{†} These are dose-dependent.

== Uncommon ==
Uncommon (0.1–1% incidence) adverse effects include:

- Orthostatic hypotension
- Syncope
- Stroke
- Seizure
- Suicidal ideation
- Elevated serum creatinine

== Rare ==
Rare (<0.01% incidence) adverse effects include:

- Agranulocytosis
- Leukopaenia
- Neutropaenia
- Tardive dyskinesia
- Neuroleptic malignant syndrome

== Unknown frequency ==
Unknown frequency adverse effects include:

- Transient ischaemic attack
- Hyperprolactinaemia (seems to be a rather prominent adverse effect according to a meta-analysis)
- Hypothermia
