= Atypical antipsychotic =

Class of pharmaceutical drugs

- Drug class
- Skeletal formula of clozapine, the first atypical antipsychotic (1972)
- Synonyms: Second generation antipsychotic, serotonin–dopamine antagonist

Legal status

Atypical antipsychotics (AAP), also known as second generation antipsychotics (SGAs) and serotonin–dopamine antagonists (SDAs), are a group of antipsychotic drugs (also generally known as tranquilizers and neuroleptics) used to treat psychiatric conditions. Largely introduced after the 1970s, most are approved for schizophrenia, with some having received additional approval for bipolar disorder, irritability in autism, and as an adjunct in major depressive disorder.

Both typical and atypical antipsychotics are characterized by blocking receptors in the brain's dopamine pathways. Atypical antipsychotics are loosely delineated for additionally blocking activity at the 5-HT_{2A} receptor. The utility of this classification, "atypical" vs "typical" (or "first" vs "second" generation), has been questioned, noting that each agent has its own efficacy and side-effect profile, and that this label may take away from a more nuanced view of individual properties.

Although thought to be safer than typical antipsychotics, atypical antipsychotics can still feature severe side effects, such as tardive dyskinesia, neuroleptic malignant syndrome, and metabolic issues such as weight gain and diabetes. They notably feature higher average weight gain than typical antipsychotics. Though less likely to cause extrapyramidal side effects than some potent typical antipsychotics, such as haloperidol, only a few have shown demonstrably lower incidence than lesser-used, low-potency first-generation antipsychotics.

== Medical uses ==
Atypical antipsychotics are typically used to treat schizophrenia or bipolar disorder. They are also frequently used to treat agitation associated with dementia, anxiety disorder, autism spectrum disorder, persecutory delusion and obsessive-compulsive disorder (an off-label use). In dementia, they should only be considered after other treatments have failed and if the patient is a risk to themselves or others.

=== Schizophrenia ===
The first-line psychiatric treatment for schizophrenia is antipsychotic medication, which can reduce the positive symptoms of schizophrenia in about 8–15 days. Antipsychotics only appear to improve secondary negative symptoms of schizophrenia in the short term and may worsen negative symptoms overall. Overall there is no good evidence that atypical antipsychotics have any therapeutic benefit for treating the negative symptoms of schizophrenia.

There is very little evidence on which to base a risk and benefit assessment of using antipsychotics for long-term treatment.

The choice of which antipsychotic to use for a specific patient is based on benefits, risks, and costs. It is debatable whether, as a class, typical or atypical antipsychotics are better. Both have equal drop-out and symptom relapse rates when typicals are used at low to moderate dosages. There is a good response in 40–50% of patients, a partial response in 30–40%, and treatment resistance (failure of symptoms to respond satisfactorily after six weeks to two of three different antipsychotics) in the remaining 20%. Clozapine is considered a first choice treatment for treatment resistant schizophrenia, especially in the short term; in the longer-terms the risks of adverse effects complicate the choice. In turn, risperidone, olanzapine, and aripiprazole have been recommended for the treatment of first-episode psychosis.

==== Efficacy in the treatment of schizophrenia ====
The utility of broadly grouping the antipsychotics into first generation and atypical categories has been challenged. It has been argued that a more nuanced view, matching the properties of individual drugs to the needs of specific patients is preferable. While the atypical (second-generation) antipsychotics were marketed as offering greater efficacy in reducing psychotic symptoms while reducing side effects (and extrapyramidal symptoms in particular) than typical medications, the results showing these effects often lacked robustness, and the assumption was increasingly challenged even as atypical prescriptions were soaring.

In 2005 the US government body NIMH published the results of a major independent (not funded by the pharmaceutical companies) multi-site, double-blind study (the CATIE project). This study compared several atypical antipsychotics to an older, mid-potency typical antipsychotic, perphenazine, among 1,493 persons with schizophrenia. The study found that only olanzapine outperformed perphenazine in discontinuation rate (the rate at which people stopped taking it due to its effects). The authors noted an apparent superior efficacy of olanzapine to the other drugs in terms of reduction in psychopathology and rate of hospitalizations, but olanzapine was associated with relatively severe metabolic effects such as a major weight gain problem (averaging 9.4 lbs over 18 months) and increases in glucose, cholesterol, and triglycerides.

No other atypical studied (risperidone, quetiapine, and ziprasidone) did better than the typical perphenazine on the measures used, nor did they produce fewer adverse effects than the typical antipsychotic perphenazine (a result supported by a meta-analysis by Leucht et al. published in The Lancet), although more patients discontinued perphenazine owing to extrapyramidal effects compared to the atypical agents (8% vs. 2% to 4%, P=0.002). A phase 2 part of this CATIE study roughly replicated these findings. Compliance has not been shown to be different between the two types. Overall evaluations of the CATIE and other studies have led many researchers to question the first-line prescribing of atypicals over typicals, or even to question the distinction between the two classes.

It has been suggested that there is no validity to the term "second-generation antipsychotic drugs" and that the drugs that currently occupy this category are not identical to each other in mechanism, efficacy, and side-effect profiles.

Each drug has its own mechanism, as Dr. Rif S. El-Mallakh, explained regarding the binding site and occupancy with a focus on the dopamine D2 receptor:

In general, when an antagonist of a neurotransmitter receptor is used, it must occupy a minimum of 65% to 70% of the target receptor to be effective. This is clearly the case when the target is a postsynaptic receptor, such as the dopamine D2 receptor. Similarly, despite significant variability in antidepressant response, blockade of 65% to 80% of presynaptic transport proteins—such as the serotonin reuptake pumps when considering serotonergic antidepressants, or the norepinephrine reuptake pumps when considering noradrenergic agents such as nortriptyline—is necessary for these medications to be effective.... Depending on the level of intrinsic activity of a partial agonist and clinical goal, the clinician may aim for a different level of receptor occupancy. For example, aripiprazole will act as a dopamine agonist at lower concentrations, but blocks the receptor at higher concentrations. Unlike antagonist antipsychotics, which require only 65% to 70% D2 receptor occupancy to be effective, aripiprazole receptor binding at effective antipsychotic doses is 90% to 95%. Since aripiprazole has an intrinsic activity of approximately 30% (i.e., when it binds, it stimulates the D2 receptor to about 30% of the effect of dopamine binding to the receptor), binding to 90% of the receptors, and displacing endogenous dopamine, allows aripiprazole to replace the background or tonic tone of dopamine, which has been measured at 19% in people with schizophrenia and 9% in controls. Clinically, this still appears as the minimal effective dose achieving maximal response without significant parkinsonism despite >90% receptor occupancy.

=== Bipolar disorder ===
In bipolar disorder, SGAs are most commonly used to rapidly control acute mania and mixed episodes, often in conjunction with mood stabilizers (which tend to have a delayed onset of action in such cases) such as lithium and valproate. In milder cases of mania or mixed episodes, mood stabilizer monotherapy may be attempted first.

SGAs are also used to treat other aspects of the disorder (such as acute bipolar depression or as a prophylactic treatment) as adjuncts or as a monotherapy, depending on the drug. Both quetiapine and olanzapine have demonstrated significant efficacy in all three treatment phases of bipolar disorder. Lurasidone (trade name Latuda) has demonstrated some efficacy in the acute depressive phase of bipolar disorder.

=== Major depressive disorder ===
In non-psychotic major depressive disorder (MDD), some SGAs have demonstrated significant efficacy as adjunctive agents; and, such agents include:

- Aripiprazole
- Brexpiprazole
- Cariprazine
- Olanzapine
- Quetiapine
- Risperidone
- Ziprasidone

whereas only quetiapine has demonstrated efficacy as a monotherapy in non-psychotic MDD. Olanzapine/fluoxetine is an efficacious treatment in both psychotic and non-psychotic MDD.

Aripiprazole, brexpiprazole, cariprazine, olanzapine, and quetiapine have been approved as adjunct treatment for MDD by the FDA in the United States. Cariprazine, quetiapine, lurasidone, and lumateperone have been approved, as monotherapies, for bipolar depression, but as of present, lurasidone has not been approved for MDD.

Amoxapine, one of the major metabolites of loxapine, is a tricyclic antidepressant on its own right (though sometimes classified as tetracyclic antidepressant), approved by FDA as a mono therapy to treat MDD, with neurotic, psychotic features, but also reactive or endogenous depressive disorders

=== Autism ===
Both risperidone and aripiprazole have received FDA approval for irritability in autism.

=== Dementia and Alzheimer's disease ===
Between May 2007 and April 2008, Dementia and Alzheimer's together accounted for 28% of atypical antipsychotic use in patients aged 65 or older. The U.S. Food and Drug Administration requires that all atypical antipsychotics carry a black box warning that the medication has been associated with an increased risk of mortality in elderly patients. In 2005, the FDA issued an advisory warning of an increased risk of death when atypical antipsychotics are used in dementia. In the subsequent 5 years, the use of atypical antipsychotics to treat dementia decreased by nearly 50%. As of now, the only FDA-approved atypical antipsychotic for alzheimer-related dementia is brexpiprazole.

=== Comparison table of efficacy ===
Relative efficacy of SGAs
Generic Drug Name	Schizophrenia	Mania	Bipolar Maintenance	Bipolar Depression	Adjunct in Major Depressive Disorder
Amisulpride	+++	?	?	?	? (+++ as a dysthymia monotherapy, however)
Aripiprazole	++	++	++/+	-	+++
Asenapine	+++	++	++	? (some evidence has suggested efficacy in treating depressive symptoms in mixed/manic episodes)	?
Blonanserin	++	?	?	?	?
Cariprazine	+++	?	?	?	?
Clozapine	+++	+++	+++	+++	?
Iloperidone	+	?	?	?	?
Loxapine	+++	++	?	+++	+++ (through its metabolite Amoxapine, a Tricyclic antidepressant)
Lurasidone	+	?	?	+++	?
Melperone	+++/++	?	?	?	?
Olanzapine	+++	+++	++	+++/++ (+++ when combined with fluoxetine)	++
Paliperidone	++	?	?	?	?
Perospirone	+	?	?	?	?
Quetiapine	++	++	+++	++	++
Risperidone	+++	+++	++	-	+
Sertindole	++	?	?	?	?
Ziprasidone	++/+	++/+	?	-	?
Zotepine	++	?	?	?	?
Legend: Inefficacious; + Less effective than most treatments, but still with some efficacy. ++ Standard, in terms of efficacy, treatment. No convincing evidence to say it is superior to other standard treatments. +++ Very efficacious agent. The efficacy of this treatment in the indication in question has been proven to be significantly greater than many other treatments.

== Adverse effects ==
The side effects reportedly associated with the various atypical antipsychotics vary and are medication-specific.

=== Tardive dyskinesia ===
Both typical and atypical antipsychotics can cause tardive dyskinesia. According to one study, rates are lower with the atypicals at 3.9% per year as opposed to the typicals at 5.5% per year. However, tardive dyskinesia typically develops after long-term (possibly decades) use of antipsychotics. It is not clear if atypical antipsychotics, having been in use for a relatively short time, produce a lower incidence of tardive dyskinesia.

One hypothesis as to why atypicals have a lower risk of tardive dyskinesia is because they are much less fat-soluble than the typical antipsychotics and because they are readily released from D2 receptor and brain tissue. The typical antipsychotics remain attached to the D2 receptors and accumulate in the brain tissue which may lead to TD.

=== Cardiovascular disease ===
It has been suggested that atypical antipsychotics increase the risk of cardiovascular disease. However, Kabinoff and colleagues (2003) suggest that the increase in cardiovascular disease is seen regardless of the treatment received, and that it is instead caused by many different factors such as lifestyle or diet.

Despite increasing some risk factors, SGAs are not associated with excess cardiovascular mortality when used to treat serious psychiatric disorders.

=== Sexual side effects ===
Sexual side effects have also been reported when taking atypical antipsychotics. In males antipsychotics reduce sexual interest and impair sexual performance, with the main difficulty being failure to ejaculate. In females there may be abnormal menstrual cycles and infertility. Both males and females can experience hyperprolactinaemia, where the breasts may become enlarged and a fluid will sometimes ooze from the nipples. Sexual adverse effects caused by some antipsychotics are a result of an increase of prolactin. Sulpiride and Amisulpiride, as well as Risperidone and paliperidone (to a lesser extent), cause a high increase of prolactin.

=== Dementia ===
In April 2005, the US Food and Drug Administration (FDA) issued an advisory and subsequent black box warning regarding the risks of atypical antipsychotic use among elderly patients with dementia. The FDA advisory was associated with decreases in the use of atypical antipsychotics, especially among elderly patients with dementia. Subsequent research reports confirmed the mortality risks associated with the use of both conventional and atypical antipsychotics to treat patients with dementia.

Consequently, in 2008 the FDA issued a black box warning for classical neuroleptics. Data on treatment efficacies are strongest for atypical antipsychotics. Adverse effects in patients with dementia include an increased risk of mortality and cerebrovascular events, as well as metabolic effects, extrapyramidal symptoms, falls, cognitive worsening, cardiac arrhythmia, and pneumonia. Conventional antipsychotics may pose an even greater safety risk. No clear efficacy evidence exists to support the use of alternative psychotropic classes (e.g. antidepressants, anticonvulsants) in patients with dementia.

=== Drug-induced OCD ===
Many different types of medication can induce obsessive-compulsive disorder (OCD) in patients that have never had symptoms before. A chapter about OCD in the DSM-5 (2013) now specifically includes drug-induced OCD.

There are reports that some atypical antipsychotics could cause drug-induced OCD in already schizophrenic patients.

=== Metabolism ===
Recently, metabolic side effects have been of considerable concern to clinicians, patients and the FDA. In 2003, the Food and Drug Administration (FDA) required all manufacturers of atypical antipsychotics to change their labeling to include a warning about the risks of hyperglycemia and diabetes with atypical antipsychotics.

It must also be pointed out that although all atypicals must carry the warning on their labeling, some evidence shows that atypicals are not equal in their effects on weight and insulin sensitivity. The general consensus is that clozapine and olanzapine are associated with the greatest effects on weight gain and decreased insulin sensitivity, followed by risperidone and quetiapine. Ziprasidone and aripiprazole are thought to have the smallest effects on weight and insulin resistance, but clinical experience with these newer agents is not as developed as that with the older agents.

The mechanism of these adverse effects is not completely understood but it is believed to result from a complex interaction between a number of pharmacologic actions of these drugs. Their effects on weight are believed to mostly derive from their actions on the H_{1} and 5-HT_{2C} receptors, while their effects on insulin sensitivity are believed to be the result of a combination of their effects on body weight (as increased body mass is known to be a risk factor for insulin resistance) and their antagonistic effects on the M_{3} receptor.

Some of the newer agents, however, such as risperidone and its metabolite paliperidone, ziprasidone, lurasidone, aripiprazole, asenapine and iloperidone, have clinically insignificant effects on the M_{3} receptor and appear to carry a lower risk of insulin resistance. Whereas clozapine, olanzapine and quetiapine (indirectly via its active metabolite, norquetiapine) all antagonise the M_{3} receptor at therapeutic-relevant concentrations.

Recent evidence suggests a role of the α_{1} adrenoceptor and 5-HT_{2A} receptor in the metabolic effects of atypical antipsychotics. The 5-HT_{2A} receptor, however, is also believed to play a crucial role in the therapeutic advantages of atypical antipsychotics over their predecessors, the typical antipsychotics.

The two atypical antipsychotics with trials showing that had a low incidence of weight gain in large meta-analysis were lurasidone and aripiprazole. In a meta-analysis of 18 antipsychotics, olanzapine and clozapine exhibited the worst metabolic parameters and aripiprazole, brexpiprazole, cariprazine, lurasidone, and ziprasidone the most benign parameters. Aripiprazole, asenapine, ziprasidone and lurasidone have low propensity to cause weight gain. Lumateperone was found to cause minimal weight gain in a long-term 12 month follow-up study.

A study by Sernyak and colleagues found that the prevalence of diabetes in atypical antipsychotic treatments was statistically significantly higher than that of conventional treatment. The authors of this study suggest that there is a causal relationship between atypical antipsychotics and diabetes, however Kabinoff et al. argue that the findings only suggest a temporal association. Kabinoff et al. suggest that there is insufficient data from large studies to demonstrate a consistent or significant difference in the risk of insulin resistance during treatment with various atypical antipsychotics. Prescribing topiramate, zonisamide, metformin, GLP-1 receptor agonists, or nizatidine alongside an antipsychotic significantly reduces weight gain.

=== Comparison table of adverse effects ===
Comparison of side effects for atypical antipsychotics
Generic Name	Weight gain	Metabolic Effects	EPS	High prolactin	Sedation	Hypotension / Orthostasis	QTc prolongation	Anti-ACh effects	Other adverse effects
Amisulpride	+	+	+	++	-	-	+++	-	Seizures, suicidal ideation
Aripiprazole	0–10%	0–10%	10–20%	-	10–20%	0–10%	-	-	Seizures (0.1–0.3%), anxiety, rhabdomyolysis, pancreatitis (<0.1%), agranulocytosis (<1%), leukopenia, neutropenia, suicidal ideation, angioedema (0.1–1%)
Asenapine	0–10%	20%	0–10%	0–10%	10–20%	0–10%	+	-	Immune hypersensitivity reaction, angioedema, suicidal ideation
Blonanserin	+/-	-	++	+	+/-	-	+	+/-	
Clozapine	20–30%	0–15%	-	-	>30%	20–30%	+	+++	Seizures (3–5%), agranulocytosis (1.3%), leukopenia, pneumonia, respiratory arrest, angle-closure glaucoma, eosinophilia (1%), thrombocytopenia, Stevens–Johnson syndrome, myocarditis, erythema multiforme and abnormal peristalsis
Iloperidone	0–10%	0–10%	0–10%	-	10–20%	0–10%	++	-	Suicidal ideation (0.4–1.1%), syncope (0.4%)
Loxapine	++	+	++	++	+++	+++	++	+	Neuroleptic malignant syndrome, Leukopenia, Neutropenia, Agranulocytosis
Lurasidone	-	-	>30%	-	20–30%	-	+	+	Agranulocytosis, seizures (<1%), elevated serum creatinine (2–4%)
Melperone	+	+	+/-	-	+/++	+/++	++	-	Agranulocytosis, neutropenia and leukopenia
Olanzapine	20–30%	0–15%	20-30%	20–30%	>30%	0–10%	+	+	Acute haemorrhagic pancreatitis, immune hypersensitivity reaction, seizures (0.9%), status epilepticus, suicidal ideation (0.1–1%)
Paliperidone	0–10%	-	10–20%	>30%	20–30%	0–10%	+/- (7%)	-	Agranulocytosis, leukopenia, priapism, dysphagia, hyperprolactinaemia, sexual dysfunction
Perospirone	?	?	>30%	+	+	+	?	-	Insomnia in up to 23%, CPK elevation neuroleptic malignant syndrome
Quetiapine	20–30%	0–15%	10–20%	-	>30%	0–10%	++	+	Agranulocytosis, leukopenia, neutropenia (0.3%), anaphylaxis, seizures (0.05–0.5%), priapism, tardive dyskinesia (0.1–5%), suicidal ideation, pancreatitis, syncope (0.3–1%)
Remoxipride	+/-	-	-	-	-	+/-	?	-	There is a risk of aplastic anaemia risk which is what led to its removal from the market.
Risperidone	10–20%	0–10%	20–30%	>30%	>30%	0–10%	+	-	Syncope (1%), pancreatitis, hypothermia, agranulocytosis, leukopenia, neutropenia, thrombocytopenia, hyperprolactinaemia, sexual dysfunction, thrombotic thrombocytopenic purpura, cerebrovascular incident (<5%), tardive dyskinesia (<5%), priapism, neuroleptic malignant syndrome (<1%), gynecomastia, galactorrhea
Sertindole	++	+/-	-	++	-	+++	+++	-	-
Sulpiride	+	+	+	+++	-	+++	+	-	Jaundice
Ziprasidone	0–10%	0–10%	0–10%	-	20–30%	0–10%	++	-	Syncope (0.6%), dysphagia (0.1–2%), bone marrow suppression, seizure (0.4%), priapism

=== Discontinuation ===
The British National Formulary recommends a gradual withdrawal when discontinuing antipsychotics to avoid acute withdrawal syndrome or rapid relapse. Symptoms of withdrawal commonly include nausea, vomiting, and loss of appetite. Other symptoms may include restlessness, increased sweating, and trouble sleeping. Less commonly there may be a feeling of the world spinning, numbness, or muscle pains. Symptoms generally resolve after a short period of time.

There is tentative evidence that discontinuation of antipsychotics can result in psychosis. It may also result in reoccurrence of the condition that is being treated. Rarely tardive dyskinesia can occur when the medication is stopped.

== Pharmacology ==
=== Pharmacodynamics ===
The atypical antipsychotics integrate with the serotonin (5-HT), norepinephrine (α, β), and dopamine (DA) receptors in order to effectively treat schizophrenia.

D_{2} Receptor: Hyperactive dopaminergic activity on D_{2} receptors in the mesolimbic pathway is responsible for the positive symptoms of schizophrenia (hallucinations, delusions, paranoia). After taking an antipsychotic, antagonism of D_{2} receptors occurs throughout the entire brain, leading to a number of deleterious side effects from D_{2} receptor antagonism throughout the entire dopamine pathway system. It's not possible to affect D_{2} receptors only in the mesolimbic pathway, (Note: p. 329-336.) but 5-HT_{2A} receptor antagonism reverses these side effects to some extent. (Note: p. 346-352.)

Reducing D_{2} dopaminergic activity in the mesolimbic pathway also results in an anhedonic effect, reducing pleasure and motivation. In the mesocortical pathway to the DLPFC and VMPFC, endogenous D_{2} receptor dopamine activity is sometimes low in schizophrenia, resulting in cognitive, affective, and, broadly, the negative symptoms of schizophrenia. D_{2} receptor antagonism further compounds these problems. In the nigrostriatal pathway, D_{2} receptor antagonism results in extrapyramidal symptoms. If this antagonism occurs long enough, symptoms of EPS may become permanent, even if antipsychotic use is discontinued.

In the tuberoinfundibular pathway, D_{2} receptor antagonism results in elevated prolactin. If prolactin levels become high enough, hyperprolactinaemia may occur, resulting in sexual dysfunction, weight gain, more rapid demineralization of bones, and possibly galactorrhea and amenorrhea.

5-HT_{2A} Receptor: When serotonin is released on to postsynaptic 5-HT_{2A} receptors, the dopamine neuron is inhibited, thus acting as a brake on dopamine release. This brake is disrupted through action of a 5-HT_{2A} antagonist, which disinhibits the dopamine neuron, stimulating dopamine release. The result of this is that dopamine competes with antipsychotic D_{2} antagonistic action at D_{2} receptors, thereby reducing antagonistic binding there and eliminating or lowering D_{2} antagonistic effects in several pathways of the dopamine system. In the nigrostriatal pathway, it reduces EPS. In the tuberoinfundibular pathway, it reduces or eliminates prolactin elevation. (Note: p. 355-360.)

Dopamine release in the mesolimbic pathway from 5-HT_{2A} antagonism does not appear to be as robust as in the other pathways of the dopamine system, thereby accounting for why atypical antipsychotics still retain part of their efficacy against the positive symptoms of schizophrenia through their D_{2} antagonism. When 5-HT_{2A} antagonistic agent particles occupy 5-HT_{2A} receptors in the mesocortical pathway and in the prefrontal cortex, the negative symptoms of schizophrenia, affective symptoms, and cognitive deficits and abnormalities are treated and reduced. Furthermore, 5-HT_{2A} receptor antagonism blocks the serotonergic excitation of cortical pyramidal cells, reducing glutamate release, which in turn lowers hyperactive dopaminergic D_{2} receptor activity in the mesolimbic pathway, reducing or eliminating the positive symptoms of schizophrenia.

Some effects of 5-HT_{1A} receptor activation include decreased aggressive behavior/ideation, increased sociability, and decreased anxiety and depression. Blockade of the 5-HT_{2C} receptor increases serotonin, releasing norepinephrine and dopamine within the brain. But neuronal reuptake of norepinephrine is limited sharply by some antipsychotics, e.g. ziprasidone.

Increased norepinephrine can cause increased glucose(blood sugar) levels. Increased blood sugar levels by increased norepinephrine causes hunger in many humans, which is why weight gain occurs with some antipsychotics if the norepinephrine is not inhibited. Inhibition of norepinephrine stabilizes mood in humans.

Loxapine has the property, uniquely among the whole atypical antipsychotics class, if not the entire antipsychotic class, to be metabolized into amoxapine (Desmethyloxapine) a tricyclic antidepressant (sometimes classified as a tetracyclic antidepressant). Amoxapine acts as serotonin-norepinephrine reuptake inhibitor (SNRI), with a strong and moderate activity on norepinephrine (NET) and serotonin transporter (SERT)the respectively. Like other SNRI, amoxapine also inhibits dopamine reuptake specifically in the prefrontal cortex, as the prefrontal cortex lack dopamine transporter which causes the dopamine reuptake to rely on norepinephrine transporter.

Amoxapine also yields significant affinity over a variety of 5-HT receptors, as well as retaining a strong Alpha-1 adrenergic receptor antagonist activity, while having lower antidopaminergic properties than loxapine (loxapine and amoxapine D2 receptors affinity are 10 and 21nm respectively), making loxapine belong to the atypical antipsychotics class, though amoxapine monotherapy might not be as effective than loxapine in treating schizophrenia in regards to its lower antidopaminergic properties. It is also, like loxapine an high antagonist affinity for 5-HT2 receptors, (0.5 nM, and 2.0 nM for 5-HT2A and 5-HT2C receptors respectively). Amoxapine has also significant binding affinity for 5-HT6 (6.0 nM) and 5-HT7 (41 nM) receptors. Loxapine, having antidepressants properties through being metabolized into amoxapine, might hold a particular place among the atypical antipsychotic as a monotherapy, as loxapine carries both atypical antipsychotic and antidepressant properties like would Olanzapine/fluoxetine (a combination of olanzapine and the SSRI antidepressant fluoxetine), which further emphasizes loxapine's unique position, as an atypical antipsychotic carrying the antidepressant properties of amoxapine, to treat concurrent mood disorders and psychotic disorders. .

5-HT_{6} receptor antagonists improve cognition, learning, and memory. The 5-HT_{7} receptor is very potent for the mitigation of bipolar conditions and also yields an antidepressant effect. The antipsychotics asenapine,, loxapine lurasidone, risperidone, and aripiprazole are very potent at the 5-HT_{7} receptor.

Antagonistic affinity for the H_{1} receptor also has an antidepressant effect. H_{1} antagonism blocks serotonin and norepinephrine reuptake. Patients with increased histamine levels have been observed to have lower serotonin levels. However, the H_{1} receptor is linked to weight gain. To have partial agonism at the 5-HT_{1A} receptor can yield absence of weight gain in an antipsychotic. This is very relevant for ziprasidone, but it creates a risk for a prolonged QTc interval. On the other hand, blockade of the 5-HT_{3} receptor removes the risk for a prolonged QTc interval, but then creates a larger risk for weight gain. Relation to the 5-HT_{3} receptor increases caloric uptake and glucose, which is seen in clozapine and olanzapine. Other ways for dopamine to resolve is to have agonism at both the D_{2} receptor and 5-HT_{1A} receptor, which normalizes the dopamine level in the brain. This occurs with cariprazine and aripiprazole.

Whether the anhedonic, loss of pleasure and motivation effect resulting from dopamine insufficiency or blockade at D_{2} receptors in the mesolimbic pathway, which is mediated in some part by antipsychotics (and despite dopamine release in the mesocortical pathway from 5-HT_{2A} antagonism, which is seen in atypical antipsychotics), or the positive mood, mood stabilization, and cognitive improvement effect resulting from atypical antipsychotic serotonergic activity is greater for the overall quality of life effect of an atypical antipsychotic is a question that is variable between individual experience and the atypical antipsychotic(s) being used.

==== Terms ====
Inhibition. Disinhibition: The opposite process of inhibition, the turning on of a biological function. Release: Causes the appropriate neurotransmitters to be discharged in vesicles into the synapse where they attempt to bind to and activate a receptor. Downregulation and Upregulation.

=== Binding profile ===
Note: Unless otherwise specified, the drugs below serve as antagonists/inverse agonists at the receptors listed.

Generic Name	D_{1}	D_{2}	D_{3}	D_{4}	5-HT_{1A}	5-HT_{1B}	5-HT_{2A}	5-HT_{2C}	5-HT_{6}	5-HT_{7}	α_{1A}	α_{1}	α_{2}	M_{1}	M_{3}	H_{1}
Amisulpride	-	++++	++++	-	-	-	-	-	-	++/+		-	+/-	-	-	-
Aripiprazole	+	++++ (PA)	+++ (PA)	+ (PA)	+++ (PA)	+	+++	++ (PA)	+	+++ (PA)		++/+	+	-	-	++/+
Asenapine	+++	+++	++++	+++	+++ (PA)	+++	++++	++++	++++	++++		+++	+++	-	-	+++
Blonanserin	-	++++	++++	+	-	?	+++	+	+	+/-		+ (RC)	+ (RC)	+	?	-
Brexpiprazole	++	+++++ (PA)	++++ (PA)	++++	+++++ (PA)	+++	+++++	+++ (PA)	+++	++++	++				-	+++
Cariprazine		++++ (PA)	+++++ (PA)		++++ (PA)		+++	++		++		++		-	-	+++
Clozapine	++	++	++	+++	++ (PA)	++/+	++++	++++	+++	+++		++++	+++	++++	+++	++++
Iloperidone	+	+++	+++	++	+ (PA)	+	+++	+	++	+		++++	+++/++	-	-	+++
Loxapine	++	++	++	++	-	-	++++	+++	++	++	++	++	-	-/+		+++
Lurasidone	+	++++	++	++	+++ (PA)	?	++++	+/-	?	++++		-	+++/++	-	-	-
Melperone	?	++	++++	++	+ (PA)	?	++	+	-	++		++	++	-	-	++
Olanzapine	+++	+++	+++	+++	+ (PA)	++	++++	+++	+++	++		++	++	++++	++++	++++
Paliperidone	++	+++	+++	++	+ (PA)	+++/++	++++	+	-	++++/+++		+++	+++	-	-	+++/++
Quetiapine	+	++/+	++/+	+	++/+ (PA)	+	+	+	++	+++/++		++++	+++/++	++	+++	++++
Risperidone	++	+++	++	+++	+ (PA)	++	++++	++	-	+++/++	++	+++/++	++	-	-	++
Sertindole	?	+++	+++	+++	++/+ (PA)	++	++++	++++	+++	++		++++/+++	+	-	-	++/+
Sulpiride	?	++++	++++	+++	-	-	-	-	-	-		-	-	-	-	-
Ziprasidone	+++/++	+++	+++	+++/++	+++ (PA)	+++ (PA)	++++	+++(PA)	++	+++		+++/++	++	-	-	++
Zotepine	+++/++	+++	++++/+++	+++	++ (PA)	+++	++++	++++ (RC)	++++	++++/+++		+++	+++/++	++ (RC)	++ (RC)	++++

Legend:

	No Affinity or No Data
-	Clinically Insignificant
+	Low
++	Moderate
+++	High
++++	Very High
+++++	Exceptionally High
PA	Partial Agonist
RC	Cloned Rat Receptor

=== Pharmacokinetics ===
Atypical antipsychotics are most commonly administered orally. Antipsychotics can also be injected, but this method is not as common. They are lipid-soluble, are readily absorbed from the digestive tract, and can easily pass the blood–brain barrier and placental barriers. Once in the brain, the antipsychotics work at the synapse by binding to the receptor.

Antipsychotics are completely metabolized in the body and the metabolites are excreted in urine. These drugs have relatively long half-lives. Each drug has a different half-life, but the occupancy of the D2 receptor falls off within 24 hours with atypical antipsychotics, while lasting over 24 hours for the typical antipsychotics. This may explain why relapse into psychosis happens quicker with atypical antipsychotics than with typical antipsychotics, as the drug is excreted faster and is no longer working in the brain.

Physical dependence with these drugs is very rare. However, if the drug is abruptly discontinued, psychotic symptoms, movement disorders, and sleep difficulty may be observed. It is possible that withdrawal is rarely seen because the AAP are stored in body fat tissues and slowly released.

Pharmacokinetic parameters of available atypical antipsychotics
Drug	Route(s) of Administration (Note: The route of administration in this category refers to the standard means of administration when the drug is being used in its capacity as an atypical antipsychotic, not for other purposes. For example, amisulpride can be administered intravenously as an antiemetic drug but this is not its standard route of administration when being used as an antipsychotic)	Half-life (t_{1/2} in hours)	Volume of distribution (V_{d} in L/kg)	Protein binding	Excretion	Enzymes involved in metabolism	Bioavailability	Peak plasma time (h)	C_{max} (ng/mL)
Amisulpride	Oral	12	5.8	16%	Urine (50%), faeces (20%; 70% of this is as unchanged drug) (Note: Note these values are from a study in of which amisulpride was intravenously administered)	?	48%	Two peaks: 1 hr & 3-4 hrs post-oral dosing	39±3 (1 hr), 54±4 (3-4 hrs)
Aripiprazole	Oral, intramuscular (including depot)	75 (94 for active metabolite)	4.9	99%	Faeces (55%), urine (25%)	CYP2D6 & CYP3A4	87% (Oral), 100% (IM)	3-5	?
Asenapine	Sublingual	24	20-25	95%	Urine (50%), faeces (40%)	CYP1A2 & UGT1A4	35% (sublingual), <2% (Oral)	0.5-1.5	4
Blonanserin	Oral	10.7 (single 4 mg dose), 12 (single 8 mg dose), 16.2 (single 12 mg dose), 67.9 (repeated bid dosing)	?	>99.7%	Urine (59%), faeces (30%)	CYP3A4	84% (Oral)	<2	0.14 (single 4 mg dose), 0.45 (single 8 mg dose), 0.76 (single 12 mg dose), 0.57 (bid dosing)
Clozapine	Oral	8 hours (single dosing), 12 (twice daily dosing)	4.67	97%	Urine (50%), faeces (30%)	CYP1A2, CYP3A4, CYP2D6	50-60%	1.5-2.5	102–771
Iloperidone	Oral	?	1340-2800	95%	Urine (45-58%), faeces (20-22%)	CYP2D6 & CYP3A4	96%	2-4	?
Loxapine	Oral, intramuscular, inhalation	3-4 hours (oral, requiring TID) 7.61 hours (inhalation)	1.18	96.8%	Urine (56-70% as metabolites), faeces (15-22%)	CYP1A2, CYP2D6, CYP3A4	90≤ (oral)	1-1.5 (oral) 1.13-2 hours (inhaled)	6.4 (oral, single 15mg dose) ; 25
Lurasidone	Oral	18	6173	99%	Faeces (80%), urine (9%)	CYP3A4	9-19%	1-3	?
Melperone	Oral, intramuscular	3–4 (oral), 6 (IM)	7–9.9	50%	Urine (70% as metabolites; 5–10.4% unchanged drug)	?	65% (tablet), 87% (IM), 54% (oral syrup)	0.5–3	75–324 (repeated dosing)
Olanzapine	Oral, intramuscular (including depot)	30	1000	93%	Urine (57%), faeces (30%)	CYP1A2, CYP2D6	>60%	6 (Oral)	?
Paliperidone	Oral, intramuscular (including depot)	23 (Oral)	390-487	74%	Urine (80%), faeces (11%)	CYP2D6, CYP3A4	28%	24 (Oral)	?
Perospirone	Oral	?	?	92%	Urine (0.4% as unchanged drug)	?	?	1.5	1.9-5.7
Quetiapine	Oral	6 (IR), 7 (XR)	6-14	83%	Urine (73%), faeces (20%)	CYP3A4	100%	1.5 (IR), 6 (XR)	?
Risperidone	Oral, intramuscular (including depot)	3 (EM) (oral), 20 (PM) (oral)	1-2	90%, 77% (metabolite)	Urine (70%), faeces (14%)	CYP2D6	70%	3 (EM), 17 (PM)	?
Sertindole	Oral	72 (55–90)	20	99.5%	Urine (4%), faeces (46-56%)	CYP2D6	74%	10	?
Ziprasidone	Oral, intramuscular	7 (oral)	1.5	99%	Faeces (66%), urine (20%)	CYP3A4 & CYP1A2	60% (Oral), 100% (IM)	6-8	?
Zotepine	Oral	13.7-15.9	10-109	97%	Urine (17%)	?	7-13%	?	?
Acronyms used: IR - Immediate release formulation. XR - Extended release formulation. EM - Extensive metabolisers. PM - Poor metabolisers. C_{max} - maximum plasma concentrations of the drug.

Pharmacokinetics of long-acting injectable antipsychotics
Medication	Brand name	Class	Vehicle	Dosage	T_{max}	t_{1/2} single	t_{1/2} multiple	logP^{c}	Ref
Aripiprazole lauroxil	Aristada	Atypical	Water^{a}	441–1064 mg/4–8 weeks	24–35 days	?	54–57 days	7.9–10.0	
Aripiprazole monohydrate	Abilify Maintena	Atypical	Water^{a}	300–400 mg/4 weeks	7 days	?	30–47 days	4.9–5.2	
Bromperidol decanoate	Impromen Decanoas	Typical	Sesame oil	40–300 mg/4 weeks	3–9 days	?	21–25 days	7.9	
Clopentixol decanoate	Sordinol Depot	Typical	Viscoleo^{b}	50–600 mg/1–4 weeks	4–7 days	?	19 days	9.0	
Flupentixol decanoate	Depixol	Typical	Viscoleo^{b}	10–200 mg/2–4 weeks	4–10 days	8 days	17 days	7.2–9.2	
Fluphenazine decanoate	Prolixin Decanoate	Typical	Sesame oil	12.5–100 mg/2–5 weeks	1–2 days	1–10 days	14–100 days	7.2–9.0	
Fluphenazine enanthate	Prolixin Enanthate	Typical	Sesame oil	12.5–100 mg/1–4 weeks	2–3 days	4 days	?	6.4–7.4	
Fluspirilene	Imap, Redeptin	Typical	Water^{a}	2–12 mg/1 week	1–8 days	7 days	?	5.2–5.8	
Haloperidol decanoate	Haldol Decanoate	Typical	Sesame oil	20–400 mg/2–4 weeks	3–9 days	18–21 days		7.2–7.9	
Olanzapine pamoate	Zyprexa Relprevv	Atypical	Water^{a}	150–405 mg/2–4 weeks	7 days	?	30 days	–	
Oxyprothepin decanoate	Meclopin	Typical	?	?	?	?	?	8.5–8.7	
Paliperidone palmitate	Invega Sustenna	Atypical	Water^{a}	39–819 mg/4–12 weeks	13–33 days	25–139 days	?	8.1–10.1	
Perphenazine decanoate	Trilafon Dekanoat	Typical	Sesame oil	50–200 mg/2–4 weeks	?	?	27 days	8.9	
Perphenazine enanthate	Trilafon Enanthate	Typical	Sesame oil	25–200 mg/2 weeks	2–3 days	?	4–7 days	6.4–7.2	
Pipotiazine palmitate	Piportil Longum	Typical	Viscoleo^{b}	25–400 mg/4 weeks	9–10 days	?	14–21 days	8.5–11.6	
Pipotiazine undecylenate	Piportil Medium	Typical	Sesame oil	100–200 mg/2 weeks	?	?	?	8.4	
Risperidone	Risperdal Consta	Atypical	Microspheres	12.5–75 mg/2 weeks	21 days	?	3–6 days	–	
Zuclopentixol acetate	Clopixol Acuphase	Typical	Viscoleo^{b}	50–200 mg/1–3 days	1–2 days	1–2 days		4.7–4.9	
Zuclopentixol decanoate	Clopixol Depot	Typical	Viscoleo^{b}	50–800 mg/2–4 weeks	4–9 days	?	11–21 days	7.5–9.0	
Note: All by intramuscular injection. Footnotes: ^{a} = Microcrystalline or nanocrystalline aqueous suspension. ^{b} = Low-viscosity vegetable oil (specifically fractionated coconut oil with medium-chain triglycerides). ^{c} = Predicted, from PubChem and DrugBank. Sources: Main: See template.

== History ==
The first major tranquilizer or antipsychotic medication, chlorpromazine (Thorazine), a typical antipsychotic, was discovered in 1951 and introduced into clinical practice shortly thereafter. Clozapine (Clozaril), an atypical antipsychotic, fell out of favor due to concerns over drug-induced agranulocytosis. Following research indicating its effectiveness in treatment-resistant schizophrenia and the development of an adverse event monitoring system, clozapine re-emerged as a viable antipsychotic.

According to Barker (2003), the three most-accepted atypical drugs are clozapine, risperidone, and olanzapine. However, he goes on to explain that clozapine is usually the last resort when other drugs fail. Clozapine can cause agranulocytosis (a decreased number of white blood cells), requiring blood monitoring for the patient. Despite the effectiveness of clozapine for treatment-resistant schizophrenia, agents with a more favorable side-effect profile were sought for widespread use.

During the 1990s, olanzapine, risperidone, and quetiapine were introduced, with ziprasidone and aripiprazole following in the early 2000s. The atypical antipsychotic paliperidone was approved by the FDA in late 2006. The atypical antipsychotic asenapine (Saphris) was approved by the FDA in 2009.

The atypical antipsychotics have found favor among clinicians and are now considered to be first-line treatments for schizophrenia and are gradually replacing the typical antipsychotics. In the past, most researchers have agreed that the defining characteristics of atypical antipsychotics are the decreased incidence of extrapyramidal side effects (EPS) and an absence of sustained prolactin elevation.

The terminology can still be imprecise. The definition of "atypicality" was based upon the absence of extrapyramidal side effects, but there is now a clear understanding that atypical antipsychotics can still induce these effects (though to a lesser degree than typical antipsychotics). Recent literature focuses more upon specific pharmacological actions and less upon categorization of an agent as "typical" or "atypical". There is no clear dividing line between the typical and atypical antipsychotics therefore categorization based on the action is difficult.

More recent research is questioning the notion that second-generation antipsychotics are superior to first generation typical antipsychotics. Using a number of parameters to assess quality of life, Manchester University researchers found that typical antipsychotics were no worse than atypical antipsychotics. The research was funded by the National Health Service (NHS) of the UK. Because each medication (whether first or second generation) has its own profile of desirable and adverse effects, a neuropsychopharmacologist may recommend one of the older ("typical" or first generation) or newer ("atypical" or second generation) antipsychotics alone or in combination with other medications, based on the symptom profile, response pattern, and adverse effects history of the individual patient.

== Society and culture ==
Between May 2007 and April 2008, 5.5 million Americans filled at least one prescription for an atypical antipsychotic. In patients under the age of 65, 71% of patients were prescribed an atypical antipsychotic to treat schizophrenia or bipolar disorder where this dropped to 38% in patients aged 65 or above.

Despite the name "antipsychotics", the drugs are commonly used for a variety of conditions that do not involve psychosis. Some healthcare professionals reported avoiding the name "atypical antipsychotic" when prescribing the drug to patients who had bipolar disorder.

=== Regulatory status ===
Regulatory status of second-generation antipsychotics (SGAs) as of July 2013
Generic name	United States FDA approved	Canada HPFB approved	Australia TGA approved	Europe EMA approved	Japan PMDA approved	United Kingdom MHRA approved
Amisulpride	No	No	Yes	(some members)	No	Yes
Aripiprazole	Yes	Yes	Yes	Yes	Yes	Yes
Asenapine	Yes	Yes	Yes	Yes	Yes	Yes
Blonanserin	No	No	No	No	Yes	No
Carpipramine	No	No	No	No	Yes	No
Clocapramine	No	No	No	No	Yes	No
Clozapine	Yes	Yes	Yes	Yes	Yes	Yes
Iloperidone	Yes	No	No	Refused	No	No
Loxapine	Yes	Yes	Yes	Yes	No	Yes
Lurasidone	Yes	Yes	Yes	Yes	No	Yes
Melperone	No	No	No	No	No	No
Mosapramine	No	No	No	No	Yes	No
Olanzapine	Yes	Yes	Yes	Yes	Yes	Yes
Paliperidone	Yes	Yes	Yes	Yes	Yes	Yes
Perospirone	No	No	No	No	Yes	No
Pimavanserin	Yes	No	No	Investigational	No	(No)
Quetiapine	Yes	Yes	Yes	Yes	Yes	Yes
Remoxipride	No	No	No	Withdrawn	No	No
Risperidone	Yes	Yes	Yes	Yes	Yes	Yes
Sertindole	No	No	No	Yes	No	Yes
Sulpiride	No	No	No	Yes	Yes	Yes
Ziprasidone	Yes	Yes	Yes	(some members)	No	Yes
Zotepine	No	No	No	No	Yes	No

== Notes ==
Stahl: AP Explained 1

== See also ==
- Antipsychotic
- List of antipsychotics
- List of investigational antipsychotics
