= Cariprazine =

Atypical antipsychotic medicine

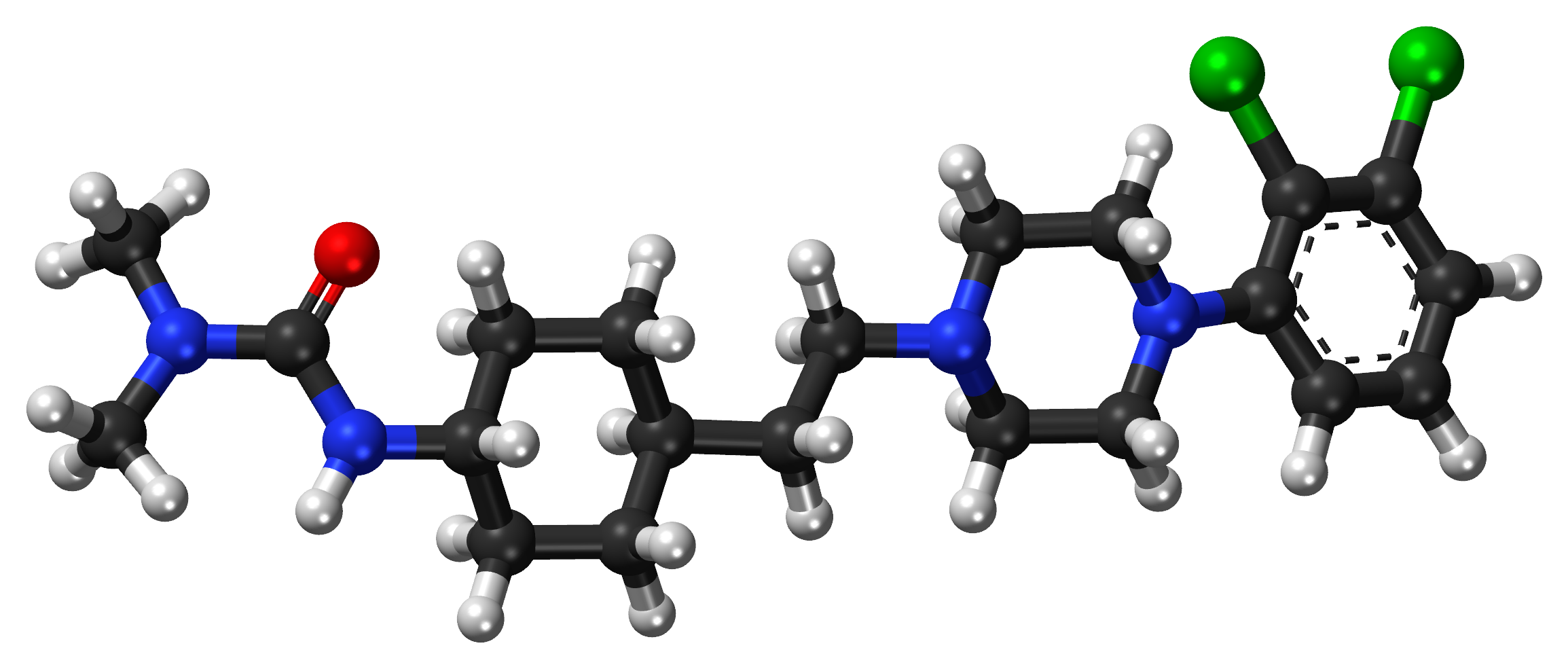

Clinical data
- Pronunciation: /kəˈrɪprəˌziːn/
- Trade names: Vraylar, Reagila, Symvenu
- Other names: RGH-188
- AHFS/Drugs.com: Monograph
- License data: US DailyMed: Cariprazine; US FDA: Cariprazine
- Pregnancy category: AU: D
- Routes of administration: By mouth
- Drug class: Atypical antipsychotic
- ATC code: N05AX15 (WHO)

Legal status
- Legal status: AU: S4 (Prescription only); CA: ℞-only; UK: POM (Prescription only); US: ℞-only; EU: Rx-only

Pharmacokinetic data
- Bioavailability: High
- Protein binding: 91–97%
- Metabolism: Liver via CYP3A4 and to a lesser extent CYP2D6
- Metabolites: desmethylcariprazine, didesmethylcariprazine
- Elimination half-life: 2–4 days for parent drug, and 1–3 weeks for active metabolites
- Excretion: Urine (21%), bile

Identifiers
- IUPAC name: N'-[trans-4-[2-[4-(2,3-Dichlorophenyl)-1-piperazinyl]ethyl]cyclohexyl]-N,N-dimethylurea
- CAS Number: 839712-12-8
- PubChem CID: 11154555
- IUPHAR/BPS: 7671
- DrugBank: DB06016
- ChemSpider: 25999972
- UNII: F6RJL8B278
- KEGG: D09997; as HCl: D09876
- ChEBI: CHEBI:90933
- ChEMBL: ChEMBL2028019
- CompTox Dashboard (EPA): DTXSID80232867

Chemical and physical data
- Formula: C_{21}H_{32}Cl_{2}N_{4}O
- Molar mass: 427.41 g·mol^{−1}
- 3D model (JSmol): Interactive image
- SMILES: CN(C)C(=O)N[C@H]1CC[C@H](CCN2CCN(CC2)c2cccc(Cl)c2Cl)CC1
- InChI: InChI=1S/C21H32Cl2N4O/c1-25(2)21(28)24-17-8-6-16(7-9-17)10-11-26-12-14-27(15-13-26)19-5-3-4-18(22)20(19)23/h3-5,16-17H,6-15H2,1-2H3,(H,24,28)/t16-,17-; Key:KPWSJANDNDDRMB-QAQDUYKDSA-N

Cariprazine, sold under the brand name Vraylar among others, is an atypical antipsychotic developed by Gedeon Richter, which is used in the treatment of schizophrenia and bipolar disorder. It is also prescribed as an add-on treatment for bipolar depression and major depressive disorder. Cariprazine acts primarily as a D_{3} and D_{2} receptor partial agonist, with a preference for the D_{3} receptor. It is a partial agonist at the serotonin 5-HT_{1A} receptor and acts as an antagonist at 5-HT_{2B} and 5-HT_{2A} receptors. It is taken by mouth. The most prevalent side effects include nausea, mild sedation, fatigue, diabetes regardless of weight changes, and dizziness. At higher dosages, there is an increased risk for restlessness, insomnia, and tremors.

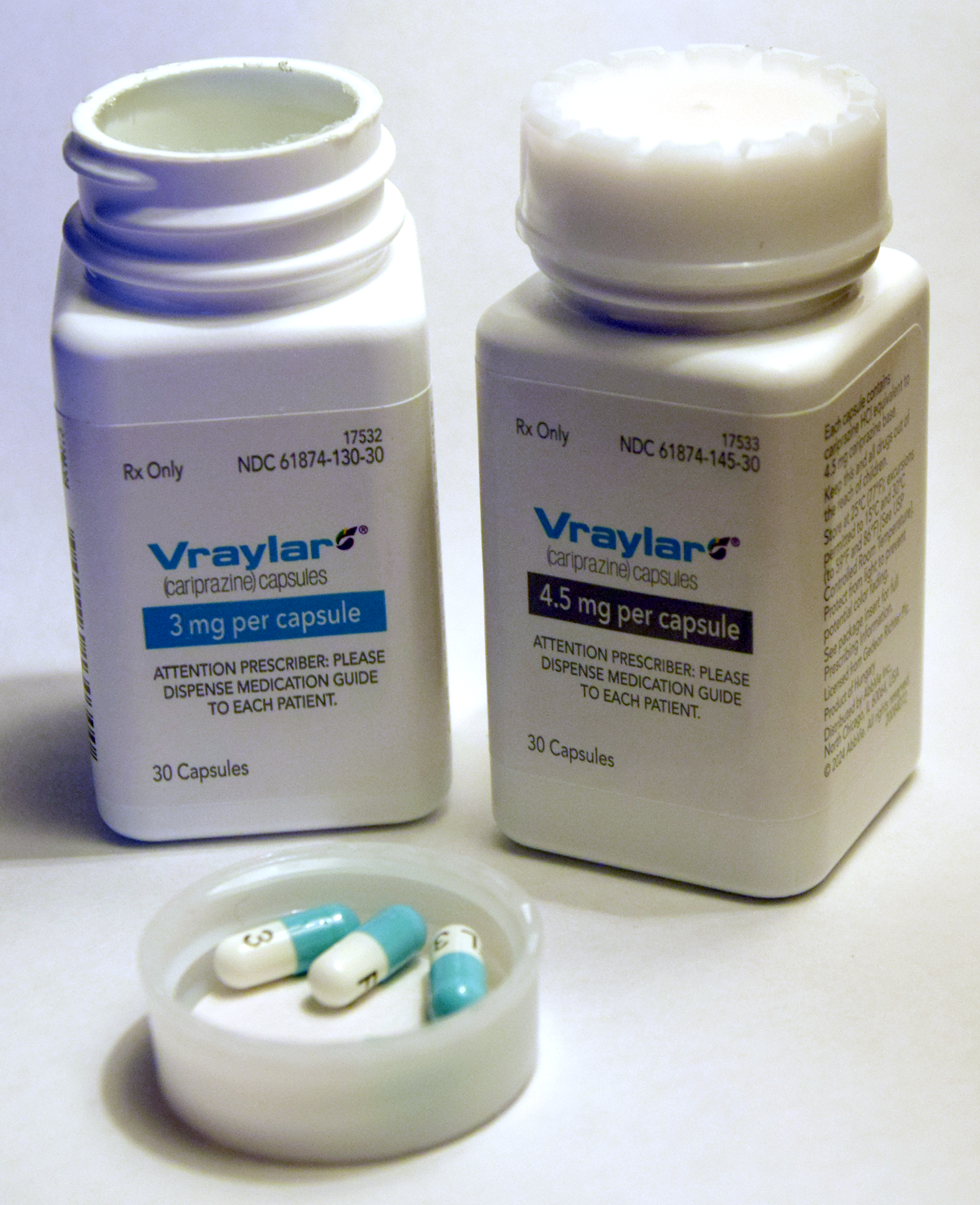
Bottles of 3mg and 4.5mg Vraylar (cariprazine) capsules showing 3mg capsules below

Cariprazine was approved for medical use in the US in September 2015. It was approved as a generic medication in 2022, but is covered by patents until 2029. Cariprazine was approved by the Therapeutic Goods Administration (TGA) for use in Australia in 2020. As of 2025, the cost of Cariprazine is generally around US$50, $25AUD on the PBS and £80.36 in the UK when on the National Health Service (NHS).

== Medical uses ==
Cariprazine is used to treat patients with schizophrenia, schizoaffective disorder and manic, depressive, or mixed episodes associated with bipolar I disorder. In the US, it is approved for schizophrenia in adults, acute treatment of manic or mixed episodes associated with bipolar I disorder in adults and treatment of depressive episodes associated with bipolar I disorder (bipolar depression). In Australia, the UK, and the European Union, cariprazine is approved only for treating schizophrenia.

Cariprazine consistently improved clinical severity across a spectrum of patients with bipolar disorder or schizophrenia, effectively reducing psychosis, anxiety, manic and depressive symptoms.

== Side effects ==
Side effects may first appear several weeks after starting cariprazine. Cariprazine does not appear to impact prolactin levels, and unlike many other antipsychotics, does not increase the QT interval on the electrocardiogram (ECG). In short term clinical trials, extrapyramidal effects, sedation, akathisia, nausea, headache, dizziness, vomiting, insomnia, anxiety, and constipation were observed. One review characterized the frequency of these events as "not greatly different from that seen in patient treated with placebo" but a second called the incidence of movement-related disorders "rather high".

Regarding these side effects, the label of cariprazine states, "The possibility of lenticular changes or cataracts cannot be excluded at this time."

Because cariprazine and its active metabolites have long half-lives, many healthcare professionals monitor for adverse effects up to several weeks after starting cariprazine. A longer monitoring period is also indicated for dosage changes, whether they represent an increase or a decrease, because elimination may take several weeks.

== Pharmacology ==
=== Pharmacodynamics ===
Cariprazine
Site	K_{i} (nM)	IA (%)	Action
5-HT_{1A}	2.6	~40%	Partial agonist / functional antagonist
5-HT_{2A}	18.8		Inverse agonist
5-HT_{2B}	0.58		Antagonist
5-HT_{2C}	134		Inverse agonist
5-HT_{7}	111		Antagonist
α_{1A}	155		Antagonist
D_{2L}	0.49	~30%	Partial agonist or functional antagonist
D_{2S}	0.69	~30%	partial agonist / Antagonist or functional full agonist
D_{3L}	0.085	~70%	Partial agonist / functional full agonist
H_{1}	23.2		Antagonist
mACh	>1,000		Antagonist
The smaller the K^{i} value, the more strongly the drug binds to the site. IA=intrinsic activity.

Unlike many antipsychotics that are D_{2} and 5-HT_{2A} receptor antagonists, cariprazine is a D_{2} and D_{3} partial agonist. It also has a higher affinity for D_{3} receptors. The D_{2} and D_{3} receptors are important targets for the treatment of schizophrenia, because the overstimulation of dopamine receptors has been implicated as a possible cause of schizophrenia. Cariprazine acts to inhibit overstimulated dopamine receptors (acting as an antagonist) and stimulate the same receptors when the endogenous dopamine levels are low. Cariprazine's high selectivity towards D_{3} receptors could prove to reduce side effects associated with the other antipsychotic drugs, because D_{3} receptors are mainly located in the ventral striatum and would not incur the same motor side effects (extrapyramidal symptoms) as drugs that act on dorsal striatum dopamine receptors. Cariprazine also acts on 5-HT_{1A} receptors, though the affinity is considerably lower than the affinity to dopamine receptors (seen in monkey and rat brain studies). In the same studies, cariprazine has been noted to produce pro-cognitive effects, the mechanisms of which are currently under investigation. An example of pro-cognitive effects occurred in pre-clinical trials with rats: rats with cariprazine performed better in a scopolamine-induced learning impairment paradigm in a water labyrinth test. This may be due to the selective antagonist nature of D_{3} receptors, though further studies need to be conducted. This result could be very useful for schizophrenia, as one of the symptoms includes cognitive deficits.

Cariprazine has partial agonist as well as antagonist properties depending on the endogenous dopamine levels. When endogenous dopamine levels are high (as is hypothesized in schizophrenic patients), cariprazine acts as an antagonist by blocking dopamine receptors. When endogenous dopamine levels are low, cariprazine acts more as an agonist, increasing dopamine receptor activity. In monkey studies, the administration of increasing doses of cariprazine resulted in a dose-dependent and saturable reduction of specific binding. At the highest dose (300 μg/kg), the D_{2}/D_{3} receptors were 94% occupied, while at the lowest dose (1 μg/kg), receptors were 5% occupied. Dopamine D_{2} and D_{3} receptor occupancy in humans has been summarized as, "In healthy volunteers, single-dose cariprazine of 0.5 mg occupied up to 12% of striatal D_{2}/D_{3} receptors, while striatal D_{2}/D_{3} occupancy after multiple dosing up to cariprazine 1.0 mg/d ranged from 63 to 79% [39]. In an open-label, fixed-dose, 2-week trial in eight males with schizophrenia, PET scans of dorsal striatal regions (caudate nucleus and putamen) and ventral striatum (nucleus accumbens) showed maximum occupancy (‡ 90%) at a 3-mg target dose of cariprazine following 14 d of treatment [40,41]. After 14 d of cariprazine 1.5 mg/d, receptor occupancy was 69% in the caudate nucleus, 69% in the nucleus accumbens, and 75% in the putamen".

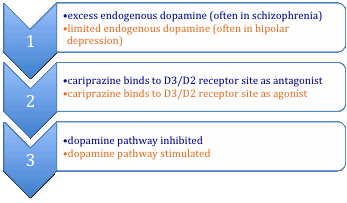
Mechanism of cariprazine action as antagonist or agonist.

Cariprazine, as well as other third generation antipsychotics, possesses a lower chance of exacerbating extrapyramidal symptoms. However the ability to induce akathasia remains relatively high. This may be mediated through a lack of anticholinergic effects (as agents of this class are sometimes used to treat akathisia), as well as a lack of a balanced dopaminergic(D_{2})/serotonergic(5-HT_{2A}) ratio (compared to the second generation antipsychotics serving a more nuanced profile in this regard). Moreover, partial agonists, through their limited response triggering, ironically often have the tendency to occupy near all targeted receptors at relatively low dosages of the drug. An extreme example is aripiprazole with an average occupancy of 70% (D_{2}) at a 2 mg dose, well below its usual antipsychotic dosage (the often cited threshold of occupancy for an antipsychotic effect is 70%). This could be another reason for akathasia from partial agonists.

Partial agonists are drugs that bind to and activate specific receptors, but they produce a weaker response than full agonists, even when all receptors are occupied. In neuronal signaling pharmacology, their activity is often described using two models: one considers how much of the drug binds to postsynaptic receptors, which can block stronger agonists from activating the receptor, while the other looks at how the drug can activate receptors by itself, but only to a limited extent compared to a full agonist. Partial agonists can act as both weak activators and blockers, depending on the presence of natural neurotransmitters like dopamine. When natural dopamine levels are high, partial agonists compete for the same receptors, reducing excessive signaling. When dopamine levels are low, partial agonists provide some activation, but not as much as dopamine or a full agonist would. The effectiveness of a partial agonist is often measured by the EC50 value, which is the concentration needed to produce half of its maximum possible effect. Drugs like aripiprazole, cariprazine, and brexpiprazole are examples of partial agonists used as antipsychotics. They help stabilize mood and reduce psychotic symptoms by balancing dopamine activity in the brain.

=== Pharmacokinetics ===
Cariprazine has high oral bioavailability and can cross the blood brain barrier easily in humans because it is lipophilic. In rats, the oral bioavailability was 52% (with a dose of 1 mg/kg).

Cariprazine is metabolized primarily by the cytochrome P450 3A4 isoenzyme (CYP3A4), with some minor metabolism by CYP2D6. Cariprazine does not induce the production of CYP3A4 or CYP1A2 in the liver, and weakly, competitively inhibits CYP2D6 and CYP3A4.

== Research ==
Positive Phase III study results were published for schizophrenia and mania in early 2012, and for bipolar disorder I depression from a Phase II trial in 2015.

Cariprazine is also potentially useful as an add-on therapy in major depressive disorder. It is being developed jointly by AbbVie and Gedeon Richter Plc, with AbbVie responsible for commercialization in the US, Canada, Japan, Taiwan and certain Latin American countries (including Argentina, Bolivia, Brazil, Chile, Colombia, Ecuador, Mexico, Peru and Venezuela). In February 2022, AbbVie requested approval by the US Food and Drug Administration (FDA) for adjunctive treatment for major depressive disorder. Approval was granted by the FDA in December 2022 for cariprazine to be used as an adjunctive treatment for major depressive disorder.

Cariprazine has been evaluated in multiple clinical trials and systematic reviews for its efficacy and safety in the treatment of psychiatric disorders, including schizophrenia, bipolar disorder, and major depressive disorder. Evidence from randomized controlled trials demonstrates that cariprazine is effective in reducing positive symptoms of schizophrenia while also showing benefits for negative symptoms, cognitive function, and overall functioning.

Its pharmacological profile, characterized by preferential dopamine D3 receptor partial agonism, has been associated with improved motivation, reward processing, and cognition, which are often impaired in psychotic and mood disorders.

In mood disorders, meta-analytic evidence from nine randomized controlled trials involving 4,889 participants indicates that cariprazine significantly improves depressive symptoms, response rates, and remission outcomes in both major depressive disorder and bipolar depression.

Additional research highlights its potential to address unmet therapeutic needs in psychiatric care, particularly in patients with treatment-resistant or complex symptom presentations.

This perspective is further supported by recent scholarly work examining the role of cariprazine in reducing mismedicine through more targeted and evidence-based treatment approaches.

Medication safety research indicates that poor patient understanding and adherence increase the risk of medication errors, emphasizing the importance of appropriate prescribing, monitoring, and patient education in optimizing clinical outcomes.
