= Paliperidone =

Atypical antipsychotic medication

Clinical data
- Trade names: Invega, others
- Other names: 9-hydroxyrisperidone; PP; PP1M; PP3M; PP6M; JNS-010; RO-92670; RO92670
- AHFS/Drugs.com: Monograph
- MedlinePlus: a607005
- License data: US DailyMed: Paliperidone
- Pregnancy category: AU: B3
- Routes of administration: By mouth, intramuscular
- Drug class: Atypical antipsychotic
- ATC code: N05AX13 (WHO)

Legal status
- Legal status: AU: S4 (Prescription only); BR: Class C1 (Other controlled substances); CA: ℞-only; US: ℞-only; EU: Rx-only

Pharmacokinetic data
- Bioavailability: 28% (oral)
- Elimination half-life: 23 hours (by mouth)
- Excretion: 1% unchanged in urine 18% unchanged in feces

Identifiers
- IUPAC name: (RS)-3-[2-[4-(6-fluoro-1,2-benzoxazol-3-yl)piperidin-1-yl]ethyl]-9-hydroxy-2-methyl-6,7,8,9-tetrahydropyrido[1,2-a]pyrimidin-4-one
- CAS Number: 144598-75-4; as palmitate: 199739-10-1
- PubChem CID: 115237; as palmitate: 9852746
- DrugBank: DB01267; as palmitate: DBSALT001464
- ChemSpider: 7978307; as palmitate: 8028457
- UNII: 838F01T721; as palmitate: R8P8USM8FR
- KEGG: D05339; as palmitate: D05340
- ChEBI: CHEBI:82978; as palmitate: CHEBI:83807
- ChEMBL: ChEMBL1621; as palmitate: ChEMBL2107360
- ECHA InfoCard: 100.117.604

Chemical and physical data
- Formula: C_{23}H_{27}FN_{4}O_{3}
- Molar mass: 426.492 g·mol^{−1}
- 3D model (JSmol): Interactive image
- SMILES: O=C/1N5/C(=N\C(=C\1CCN4CCC(c3noc2cc(F)ccc23)CC4)C)[C@H](O)CCC5
- InChI: InChI=1S/C23H27FN4O3/c1-14-17(23(30)28-9-2-3-19(29)22(28)25-14)8-12-27-10-6-15(7-11-27)21-18-5-4-16(24)13-20(18)31-26-21/h4-5,13,15,19,29H,2-3,6-12H2,1H3/t19-/m1/s1; Key:PMXMIIMHBWHSKN-LJQANCHMSA-N; as palmitate: InChI=1S/C39H57FN4O4/c1-3-4-5-6-7-8-9-10-11-12-13-14-15-18-36(45)47-34-17-16-24-44-38(34)41-29(2)32(39(44)46)23-27-43-25-21-30(22-26-43)37-33-20-19-31(40)28-35(33)48-42-37/h19-20,28,30,34H,3-18,21-27H2,1-2H3; Key:VOMKSBFLAZZBOW-UHFFFAOYSA-N

Paliperidone, sold under the brand name Invega among others, is an atypical antipsychotic. It is used for the treatment of schizophrenia and schizoaffective disorder. It is marketed by Janssen Pharmaceuticals.

Paliperidone was approved by the US Food and Drug Administration (FDA) for the treatment of schizophrenia in December 2006, and in the European Union in June 2007. Paliperidone palmitate is a long-acting injectable formulation of paliperidone palmitoyl ester. It is on the World Health Organization's List of Essential Medicines. Paliperidone is available as a generic medication.

== Medical use ==
In the United States, paliperidone is indicated for the treatment of schizophrenia and for the treatment of schizoaffective disorder as monotherapy and as an adjunct to mood stabilizers and/or antidepressants.

In the European Union, paliperidone is indicated for the treatment of schizophrenia in adults and in adolescents fifteen years of age and older and for the treatment of schizoaffective disorder in adults.

== Adverse effects ==
The most common side effects include headache, insomnia, sleepiness, parkinsonism (effects similar to Parkinson's disease such as shaking, muscle stiffness and slow movement), dystonia (involuntary muscle contractions), tremor (shaking), dizziness, akathisia (restlessness), agitation, anxiety, depression, weight gain, nausea, vomiting, constipation, dyspepsia (heartburn), diarrhea, dry mouth, tiredness, toothache, muscle and bone pain, back pain, asthenia (weakness), tachycardia (increased heart rate), high blood pressure, prolonged QT interval (an alteration of the electrical activity of the heart), upper respiratory tract infection (nose and throat infections) and cough.

A 2020 pharmacovigilance study using the Korean Adverse Event Reporting System (KAERS) compared safety signals for paliperidone with those of other atypical antipsychotics. The analysis found that paliperidone was disproportionately associated with hyperprolactinemia‑related events (galactorrhea, amenorrhea, gynecomastia), weight increase, and metabolic disturbances. The authors concluded that the real‑world safety profile of paliperidone warrants continued monitoring, particularly for endocrine and metabolic adverse effects.

A 2023 study found that paliperidone may worsen verbal learning and memory compared to placebo in the early months of psychosis treatment.

Other symptoms may include restlessness, increased sweating, and trouble sleeping. Less commonly there may be a feeling of the world spinning, numbness, or muscle pains.

== Pharmacology ==
Paliperidone is the primary active metabolite of the older antipsychotic risperidone. While its specific mechanism of action is unknown, it is believed paliperidone and risperidone act via similar, if not identical, pathways. Its efficacy is believed to result from central dopaminergic and serotonergic antagonism except paliperidone, like its parent compound risperidone, functions as an inverse agonist at 5-HT_{2A} receptor 15. Paliperidone also acts as an antagonist of alpha-1 and alpha-2 adrenergic receptors as well as H_{1} histamine receptors. Food is known to increase the absorption of Invega type ER OROS prolonged-release tablets. Food increased exposure of paliperidone by up to 50-60%; however, half-life was not significantly affected. The effect was probably due to a delay in the transit of the ER OROS formulation in the upper part of the GI tract, resulting in increased absorption.

Risperidone and its metabolite paliperidone are reduced in efficacy by P-glycoprotein inducers such as St John's wort

Pharmacokinetics of long-acting injectable antipsychotics
Medication	Brand name	Class	Vehicle	Dosage	T_{max}	t_{1/2} single	t_{1/2} multiple	logP^{c}	Ref
Aripiprazole lauroxil	Aristada	Atypical	Water^{a}	441–1064 mg/4–8 weeks	24–35 days	?	54–57 days	7.9–10.0	
Aripiprazole monohydrate	Abilify Maintena	Atypical	Water^{a}	300–400 mg/4 weeks	7 days	?	30–47 days	4.9–5.2	
Bromperidol decanoate	Impromen Decanoas	Typical	Sesame oil	40–300 mg/4 weeks	3–9 days	?	21–25 days	7.9	
Clopentixol decanoate	Sordinol Depot	Typical	Viscoleo^{b}	50–600 mg/1–4 weeks	4–7 days	?	19 days	9.0	
Flupentixol decanoate	Depixol	Typical	Viscoleo^{b}	10–200 mg/2–4 weeks	4–10 days	8 days	17 days	7.2–9.2	
Fluphenazine decanoate	Prolixin Decanoate	Typical	Sesame oil	12.5–100 mg/2–5 weeks	1–2 days	1–10 days	14–100 days	7.2–9.0	
Fluphenazine enanthate	Prolixin Enanthate	Typical	Sesame oil	12.5–100 mg/1–4 weeks	2–3 days	4 days	?	6.4–7.4	
Fluspirilene	Imap, Redeptin	Typical	Water^{a}	2–12 mg/1 week	1–8 days	7 days	?	5.2–5.8	
Haloperidol decanoate	Haldol Decanoate	Typical	Sesame oil	20–400 mg/2–4 weeks	3–9 days	18–21 days		7.2–7.9	
Olanzapine pamoate	Zyprexa Relprevv	Atypical	Water^{a}	150–405 mg/2–4 weeks	7 days	?	30 days	–	
Oxyprothepin decanoate	Meclopin	Typical	?	?	?	?	?	8.5–8.7	
Paliperidone palmitate	Invega Sustenna	Atypical	Water^{a}	39–819 mg/4–12 weeks	13–33 days	25–139 days	?	8.1–10.1	
Perphenazine decanoate	Trilafon Dekanoat	Typical	Sesame oil	50–200 mg/2–4 weeks	?	?	27 days	8.9	
Perphenazine enanthate	Trilafon Enanthate	Typical	Sesame oil	25–200 mg/2 weeks	2–3 days	?	4–7 days	6.4–7.2	
Pipotiazine palmitate	Piportil Longum	Typical	Viscoleo^{b}	25–400 mg/4 weeks	9–10 days	?	14–21 days	8.5–11.6	
Pipotiazine undecylenate	Piportil Medium	Typical	Sesame oil	100–200 mg/2 weeks	?	?	?	8.4	
Risperidone	Risperdal Consta	Atypical	Microspheres	12.5–75 mg/2 weeks	21 days	?	3–6 days	–	
Zuclopentixol acetate	Clopixol Acuphase	Typical	Viscoleo^{b}	50–200 mg/1–3 days	1–2 days	1–2 days		4.7–4.9	
Zuclopentixol decanoate	Clopixol Depot	Typical	Viscoleo^{b}	50–800 mg/2–4 weeks	4–9 days	?	11–21 days	7.5–9.0	
Note: All by intramuscular injection. Footnotes: ^{a} = Microcrystalline or nanocrystalline aqueous suspension. ^{b} = Low-viscosity vegetable oil (specifically fractionated coconut oil with medium-chain triglycerides). ^{c} = Predicted, from PubChem and DrugBank. Sources: Main: See template.

Paliperidone
Site	K_{i} (nM)
5-HT_{1A}	6.17
5-HT_{2A}	1
5-HT_{2C}	48
5-HT_{6}	24
5-HT_{7}	2.7
α_{1A}	2.5
α_{2A}	3.9
α_{2C}	2.7
D_{1}	41
D_{2}	1.6
D_{3}	3.5
D_{4}	54
D_{5}	29
H_{1}	19
H_{2}	121
mACh	>10,000

Values are K_{i} (nM). The smaller the value, the more strongly the drug binds to the site.

== History ==
Paliperidone (as Invega) was approved by the US Food and Drug Administration (FDA) for the treatment of schizophrenia in 2006. Paliperidone was approved by the FDA for the treatment of schizoaffective disorder in 2009. The long-acting injectable form of paliperidone, marketed as Invega Sustenna in the US, and Xeplion in the EU, was approved by the FDA in July 2009.

It was initially approved in the European Union in 2007, for schizophrenia, the extended release form and use for schizoaffective disorder were approved in the EU in 2010, and extension to use in adolescents older than 15 years old was approved in 2014.

== Society and culture ==
=== Deaths ===
In April 2014, it was reported that 21 Japanese people who had received shots of the long-acting injectable paliperidone palmitate had died, out of 10,700 individuals prescribed the drug.

On December 4, 2014, a 5-year-old Spanish boy, Borja Piriz Matía, died 15 days after he started taking paliperidone (Invega) 3 mg.

In 2019, it was reported that a 33-year-old man died after a single injection of 819 mg of Trevicta (paliperidone palmitate three-monthly injection), with paliperidone poisoning appearing to be the highly likely cause of death.

==== Suicides ====
On January 17, 2020, a video titled "Medical Help" was uploaded to YouTube by 26-year-old Wail Ardab of Palatka, Florida, who developed dystonia and insomnia after taking Invega Trinza injections. On March 5, 2020, Ardab committed suicide by jumping from Memorial Bridge in Palatka.

From June 2023 to April 2024, Serbian television presenter and journalist Bojana Nikolić Janković posted to the internet forum Bluelight that she received 4 shots of Invega Sustenna and 2 shots of Invega Trinza due to the stress of her divorce from Ognjen Janković, a member of the hip-hop group Beogradski Sindikat. Janković, known for hosting the show City, wrote that she was bedridden with persistent anhedonia, cognitive issues, low energy and other symptoms consistent with neuroleptic-induced deficit syndrome after receiving the injections. She died in Belgrade on April 19, 2024, at age 46.

==== Homicides ====
On December 28, 2021, 19-year-old Peyton Moyer fatally shot his mother and her boyfriend in Watkinsville, Georgia, while under the influence of the long-acting injectable paliperidone palmitate (Invega Sustenna). On November 2, 2023, Moyer was sentenced to life in prison.

=== Lawsuits ===
From 2019 to 2024, Maria Francesca Gioia, a former medical student acting as a pro se plaintiff, filed nine product liability lawsuits against Janssen Pharmaceuticals and related parties. She alleged that taking Invega Sustenna (paliperidone palmitate) caused her memory loss, hypothyroidism, Horner's syndrome, nerve damage, motor tremors, vocal tics, confusion, loss of taste and sensation, post-traumatic stress disorder, and metabolic syndrome (including hypertension, diabetes, and stroke), which ended her career as a primary care physician. All nine lawsuits were dismissed on procedural grounds: Gioia I–II for failure to state a claim, Gioia III for failure to prosecute, and Gioia IV–V for lack of subject matter jurisdiction. The court also noted that the side effects she alleged were already listed on Invega's FDA-approved warning label.

In September 2024, Cassandra Fameux filed a criminal complaint alleging that her husband, a Michigan anesthesiologist, had forcibly injected her with unprescribed Invega Sustenna on multiple occasions between 2017 and 2021. A subsequent police investigation led to a recommendation that he be charged with domestic assault.

In May and June 2022, Adilah Patton, a 28‑year‑old pretrial detainee in Indianapolis, was forcibly injected twice with unprescribed Invega Sustenna while in custody at the Marion County Adult Detention Center. A federal lawsuit filed on her behalf alleges that the injections were administered without a medical assessment, a prescription, or the consent of her court‑appointed guardian. The lawsuit describes the injections as assault, battery, excessive force, and violations of the Fourteenth Amendment right to informed consent.

=== Brand names ===
In May 2015, a formulation of paliperidone palmitate was approved by the US Food and Drug Administration under the brand name Invega Trinza. A similar prolonged release suspension was approved in 2016 by the European Medicines Agency originally under the brand name Paliperidone Janssen, later renamed to Trevicta. In September 2021, a newer formulation of paliperidone palmitate, Invega Hafyera, was approved by the US FDA.
