= O-Methylanhalonidine =

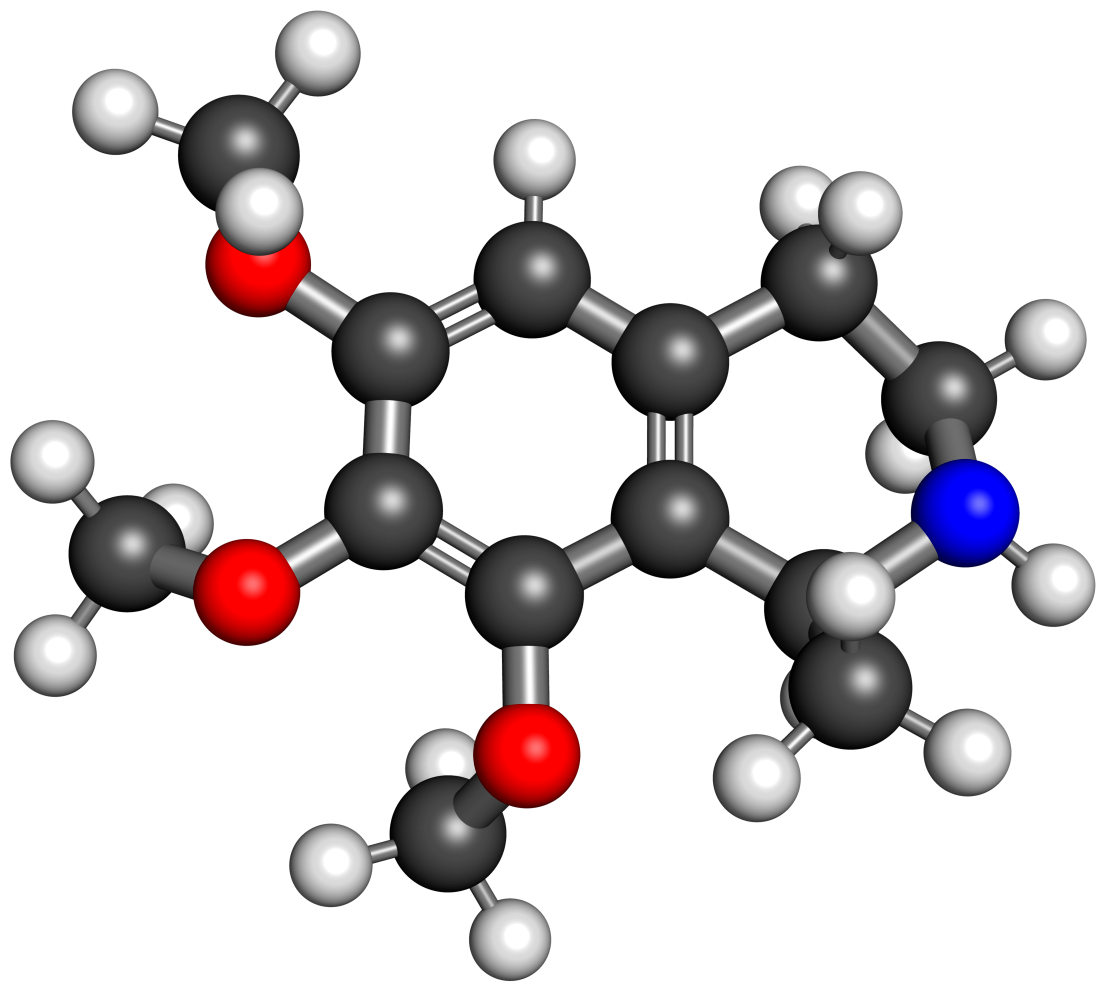

Clinical data
- Other names: 1-Methylanhalinine; 6,7,8-trimethoxy-1-methyl-1,2,3,4-tetrahydroisoquinoline; 6,7,8-trimethoxy-1-methyl-THIQ
- Drug class: Serotonin 5-HT_{7} receptor inverse agonist
- ATC code: None

Identifiers
- IUPAC name: 6,7,8-trimethoxy-1-methyl-1,2,3,4-tetrahydroisoquinoline
- PubChem CID: 613648
- ChemSpider: 533403
- KEGG: 16705
- ChEBI: CHEBI:80670
- ChEMBL: ChEMBL1178706

Chemical and physical data
- Formula: C_{13}H_{19}NO_{3}
- Molar mass: 237.299 g·mol^{−1}
- 3D model (JSmol): Interactive image
- SMILES: CC1C2=C(C(=C(C=C2CCN1)OC)OC)OC
- InChI: InChI=1S/C13H19NO3/c1-8-11-9(5-6-14-8)7-10(15-2)12(16-3)13(11)17-4/h7-8,14H,5-6H2,1-4H3; Key:VMFUYWSNWQYUTG-UHFFFAOYSA-N

O-Methylanhalonidine, also known as 1-methylanhalinine, is a tetrahydroisoquinoline alkaloid found in peyote (Lophophora williamsii) and various other cactus species. It has been found to act as an inverse agonist of the serotonin 5-HT_{7} receptor.

== See also ==
- Substituted tetrahydroisoquinoline
- Anhalonidine
- Anhalinine
- N-Methylanhalinine
- O-Methylpellotine
- Pellotine (N-methylanhalonidine)
