= 1-(2-Diphenyl)piperazine =

Chemical compound

Identifiers
- IUPAC name: 1-(2-diphenyl)piperazine
- CAS Number: 180698-18-4
- PubChem CID: 2737389
- ChemSpider: 2019031
- UNII: T5S5265H6V
- ChEMBL: ChEMBL494675
- CompTox Dashboard (EPA): DTXSID901029791

Chemical and physical data
- Formula: C_{16}H_{18}N_{2}
- Molar mass: 238.334 g·mol^{−1}
- 3D model (JSmol): Interactive image
- SMILES: C3CNCCN3c1ccccc1-c2ccccc2
- InChI: InChI=1S/C16H18N2/c1-2-6-14(7-3-1)15-8-4-5-9-16(15)18-12-10-17-11-13-18/h1-9,17H,10-13H2; Key:RKRVRTJVCWZOQS-UHFFFAOYSA-N

1-(2-Diphenyl)piperazine, also known as RA-7, is a drug that acts as a potent and selective antagonist at the 5HT_{7} serotonin receptor. It was discovered as an active metabolite of the synthetic 5-HT_{7} agonists LP-12 and LP-211 and unexpectedly turned out to be a potent antagonist with selectivity approaching that of the parent molecules, despite its much simpler structure.

== See also ==
- Benzylpiperazine
- Naphthylpiperazine
- Phenylpiperazine
