= Tramadol =

Synthetic opioid pain medication

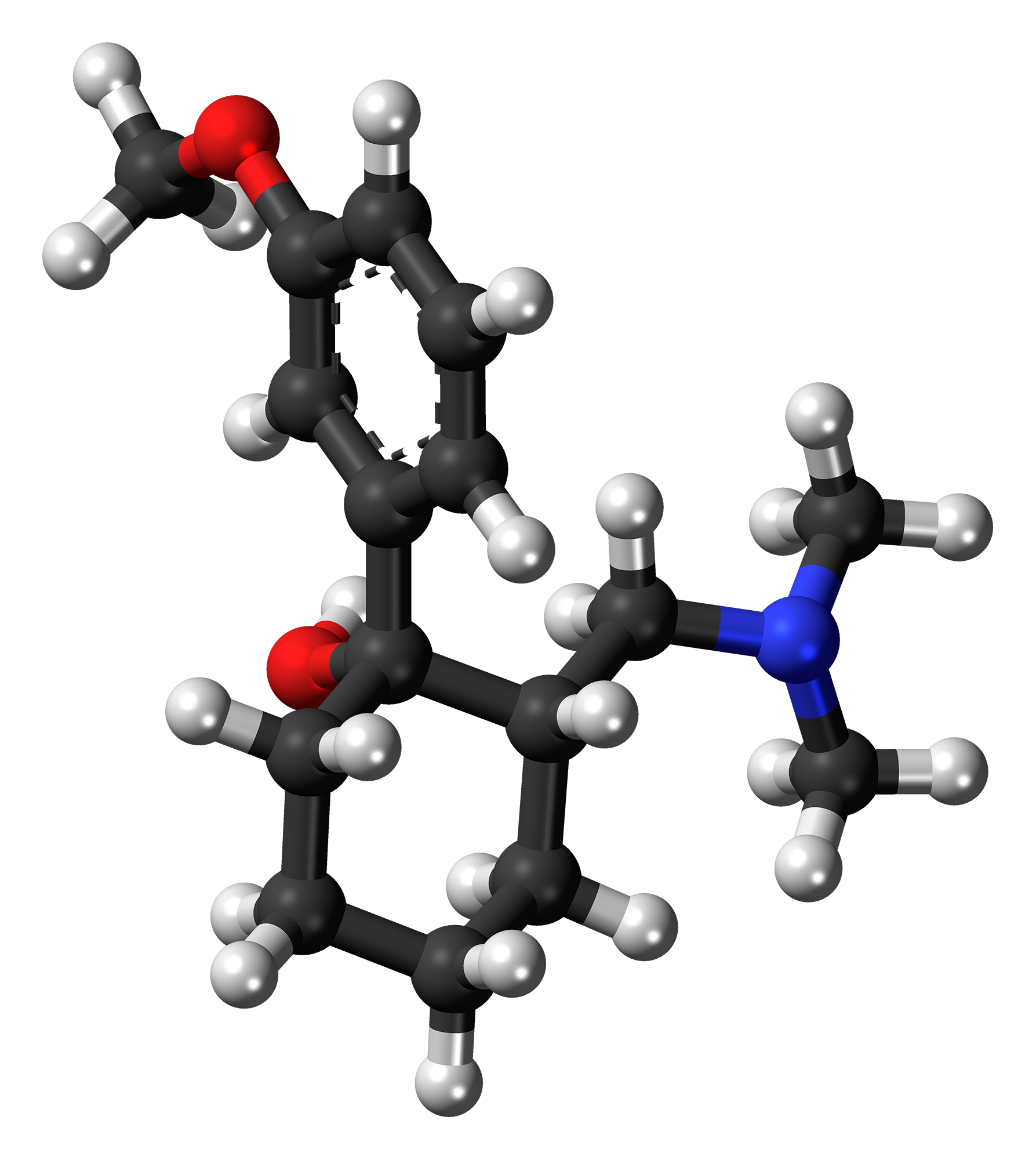

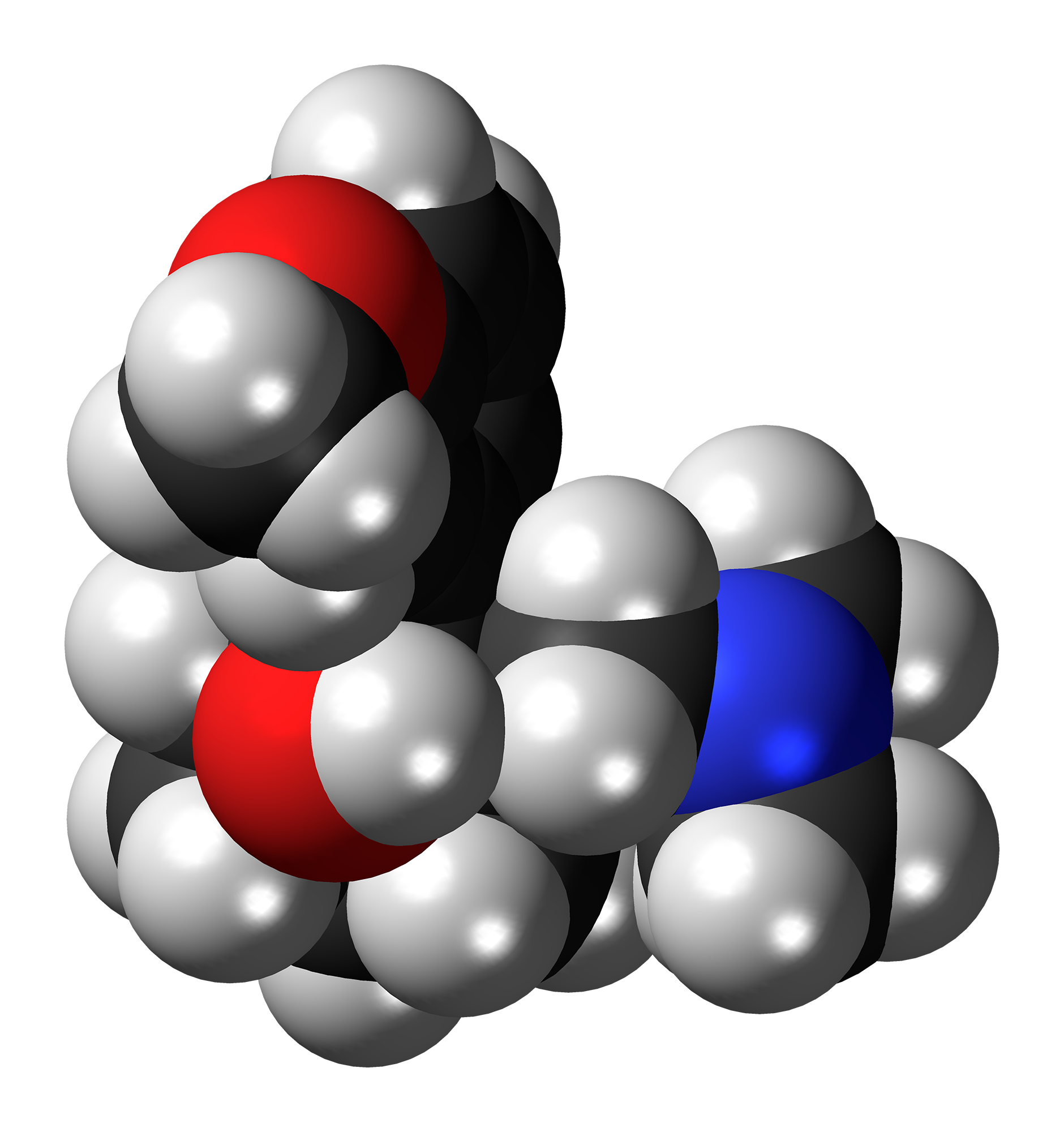

Clinical data
- Pronunciation: /ˈtræməˌdɒl/
- Trade names: Tramal, others
- AHFS/Drugs.com: Monograph
- MedlinePlus: a695011
- License data: US DailyMed: Tramadol
- Pregnancy category: AU: C
- Routes of administration: By mouth, intravenous, intramuscular, rectal
- Drug class: Opioid; Serotonin–norepinephrine reuptake inhibitor
- ATC code: N02AX02 (WHO) N02AJ13 (WHO)

Legal status
- Legal status: AU: S4 (Prescription only); BR: Class A2 (Narcotic drugs); CA: Schedule I; NZ: Class C2; UK: POM (Prescription only) / Class C; US: Schedule IV; UN: Unscheduled; EU: Rx-only; SE: Förteckning III In general: Prescription only

Pharmacokinetic data
- Bioavailability: 68% (by mouth), 77% (rectal), 100% (IM)
- Protein binding: 20%
- Metabolism: Liver-mediated demethylation and glucuronidation via CYP2D6 & CYP3A4
- Metabolites: O-desmethyltramadol; N-desmethyltramadol
- Onset of action: < 1 hour (by mouth)
- Elimination half-life: 6.3 ± 1.4 h
- Duration of action: 6 hours
- Excretion: Urine (95%)

Identifiers
- IUPAC name: 2-[(dimethylamino)methyl]-1-(3-methoxyphenyl)cyclohexan-1-ol
- CAS Number: 27203-92-5
- PubChem CID: 33741
- DrugBank: DB00193
- ChemSpider: 31105
- UNII: 39J1LGJ30J
- KEGG: D08623; as HCl: D01355
- ChEBI: CHEBI:9648
- ChEMBL: ChEMBL1066
- CompTox Dashboard (EPA): DTXSID401167150 DTXSID90858931, DTXSID401167150
- ECHA InfoCard: 100.043.912

Chemical and physical data
- Formula: C_{16}H_{25}NO_{2}
- Molar mass: 263.381 g·mol^{−1}
- 3D model (JSmol): Interactive image
- Melting point: 180 to 181 °C (356 to 358 °F)
- SMILES: CN(C)C[C@H]1CCCC[C@@]1(C2=CC(=CC=C2)OC)O
- InChI: InChI=1S/C16H25NO2/c1-17(2)12-14-7-4-5-10-16(14,18)13-8-6-9-15(11-13)19-3/h6,8-9,11,14,18H,4-5,7,10,12H2,1-3H3/t14-,16+/m1/s1; Key:TVYLLZQTGLZFBW-ZBFHGGJFSA-N

Tramadol, sold under the brand name Tramal among others, is an opioid pain medication and a serotonin–norepinephrine reuptake inhibitor (SNRI) used to treat moderate to severe pain. When taken by mouth in an immediate-release formulation, the onset of pain relief usually begins within an hour. It is also available by injection. It is available in combination with paracetamol (acetaminophen).

As is typical of opioids, common side effects include constipation, itchiness, and nausea. Serious side effects may include hallucinations, seizures, increased risk of serotonin syndrome, decreased alertness, and drug addiction. A change in dosage may be recommended in those with kidney or liver problems. It is not recommended in those who are at risk of suicide or in those who are pregnant. While not recommended in women who are breastfeeding, those who take a single dose should not generally have to stop breastfeeding. Tramadol is converted in the liver to O-desmethyltramadol (desmetramadol), an opioid with a stronger affinity for the μ-opioid receptor.

Tramadol was patented in 1972 and launched under the brand name Tramal in 1977 by the West German pharmaceutical company Grünenthal GmbH. In the mid-1990s, it was approved in the United Kingdom and the United States. It is available as a generic medication and marketed under many brand names worldwide. In 2023, it was the 36th most commonly prescribed medication in the United States, with more than 16 million prescriptions.

== Medical uses ==
=== Pain relief ===
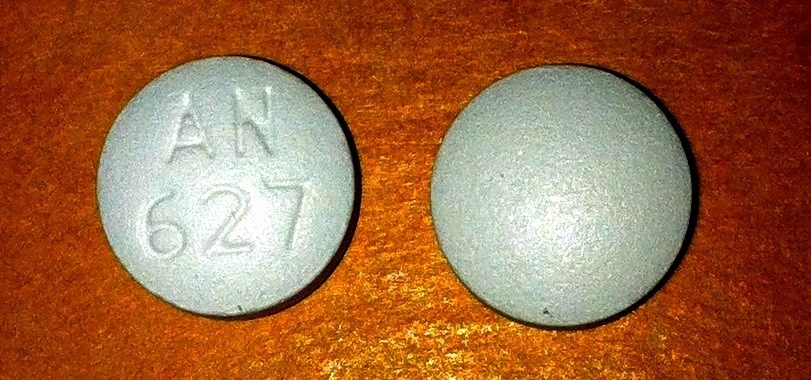
Generic tramadol HCl tablets marketed by Amneal Pharmaceuticals

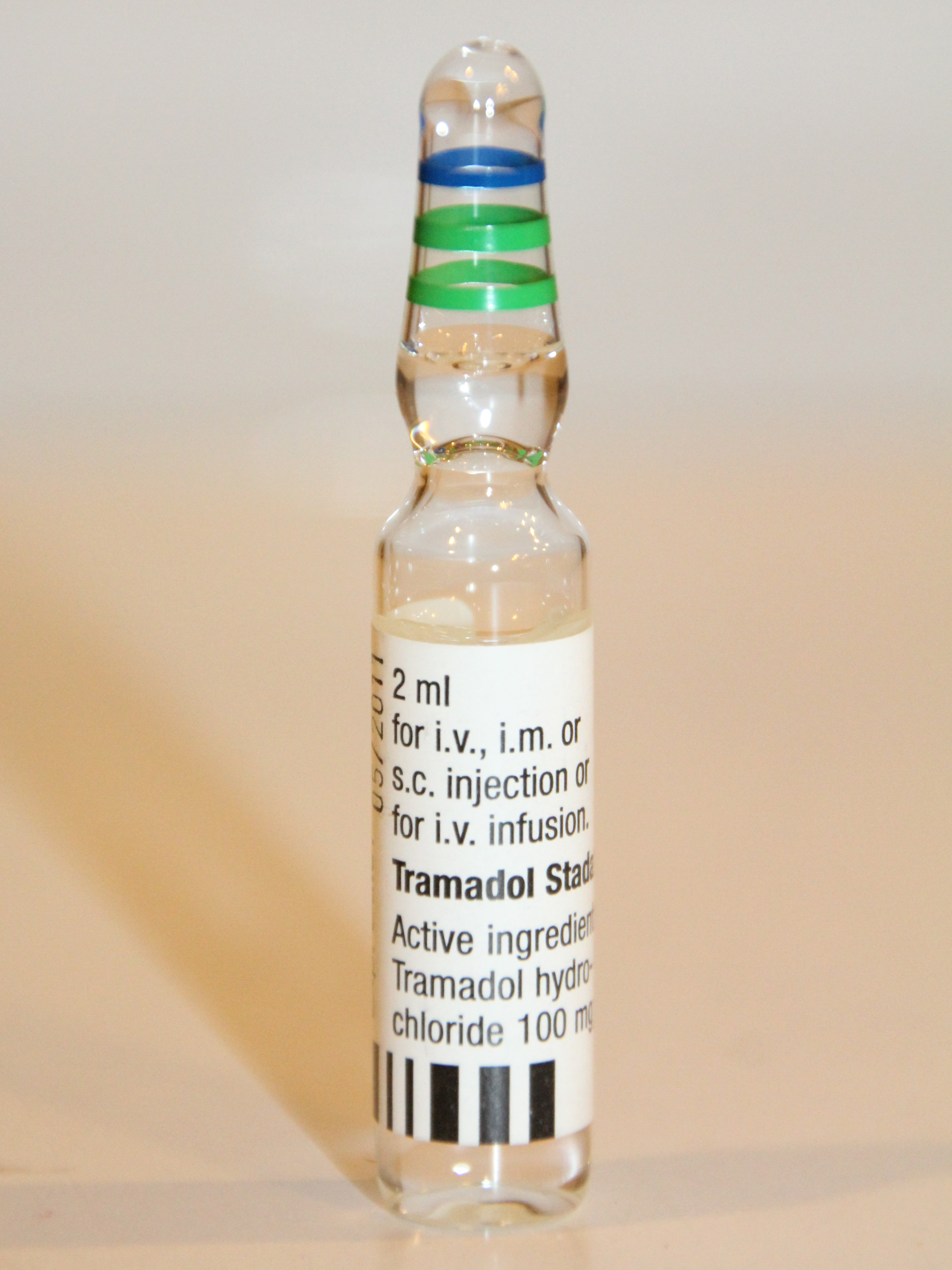
Tramadol HCl for injection

Tramadol is used primarily to treat mild to severe pain, both acute and chronic. There is moderate evidence for use as a second-line treatment for fibromyalgia, but it is not FDA-approved for this use. Its use is approved for treatment of fibromyalgia as a secondary painkiller by the UK NHS.

Its analgesic effects take approximately an hour to be realized, and it takes from two to four hours to reach peak effect after oral administration with an immediate-release formulation. On a dose-by-dose basis, tramadol has about one-tenth the potency of morphine (thus 100 mg is commensurate with 10 mg morphine but may vary) and is practically equally potent when compared with pethidine and codeine. For moderate pain, its effectiveness is roughly equivalent to that of codeine in low doses and hydrocodone at very high doses. For severe pain, it is less effective than morphine.

Pain-reducing effects last approximately six hours. The potency of analgesia varies considerably as it depends on an individual's genetics. People with specific variants of CYP2D6 enzymes may not produce adequate amounts of the active metabolite (desmetramadol) for effective pain control.

=== Off-label uses ===
==== Restless legs syndrome ====
Sleep medicine physicians sometimes prescribe tramadol (or other opioid medications) for refractory restless legs syndrome (RLS); that is, RLS that does not respond adequately to treatment with first-line medications such as dopamine agonists (e.g., pramipexole) or gabapentinoids, often due to augmentation.

==== Premature ejaculation ====
Tramadol, due to its activity as a serotonin reuptake inhibitor, is effective in the treatment of premature ejaculation per systematic reviews and meta-analyses and is used off-label for this indication. However, the British Society for Sexual Medicine 2025 guidelines recommend against use of tramadol for premature ejaculation due to recent reports of habituation.

== Contraindications ==
=== Pregnancy and lactation ===
Use of tramadol during pregnancy is generally avoided, as it may cause some reversible withdrawal effects in the newborn. A small prospective study in France found, while an increased risk of miscarriages existed, no major malformations were reported in the newborn. Its use during lactation is also generally advised against, but a small trial found that infants breastfed by mothers taking tramadol were exposed to about 2.88% of the dose the mothers were taking. No evidence of this dose harming the newborn was seen.

=== Labor and delivery ===
Its use as an analgesic during labor is not advised due to its long onset of action (1 hour). The ratio of the mean concentration of the drug in the fetus compared to that of the mother when it is given intramuscularly for labor pains has been estimated to be 1:94.

=== Children ===
Its use in children is generally advised against, although it may be done under the supervision of a specialist. On 21 September 2015, the FDA started investigating the safety of tramadol in use in persons under the age of 17. The investigation was initiated because some of these people have experienced slowed or difficult breathing. The FDA lists age under 12 years old as a contraindication.

=== Elderly ===
The risk of opioid-related adverse effects such as respiratory depression, falls, cognitive impairment, and sedation is increased. Tramadol may interact with other medications and increase the risk for adverse events.

=== Liver and kidney failure ===
The drug should be used with caution in those with liver or kidney failure, due to metabolism in the liver (to the active molecule desmetramadol) and elimination by the kidneys.

== Side effects ==
The most common adverse effects of tramadol include nausea, dizziness, dry mouth, indigestion, abdominal pain, vertigo, vomiting, constipation, drowsiness, and headache. Other side effects may result from interactions with other medications. Tramadol has the same dose-dependent adverse effects as morphine including respiratory depression.

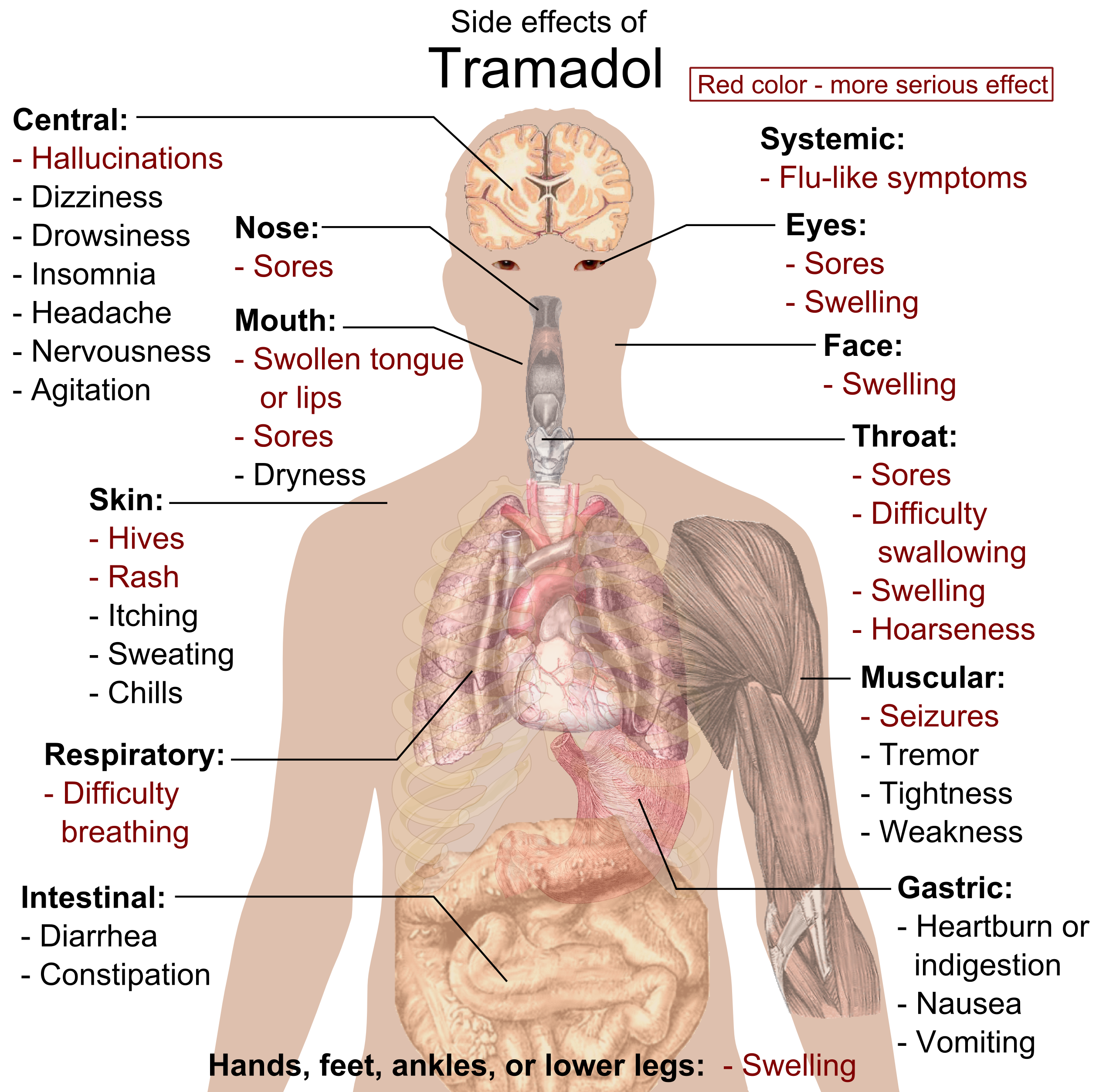
Main side effects of tramadol: Red color denotes more serious effects, requiring immediate contact with health provider.

=== Dependence and withdrawal ===
Long-term use of high doses of tramadol causes physical dependence and withdrawal syndrome. These include both symptoms typical of opioid withdrawal and those associated with serotonin–norepinephrine reuptake inhibitor (SNRI) withdrawal; symptoms include numbness, tingling, paresthesia, and tinnitus. Psychiatric symptoms may include hallucinations, paranoia, extreme anxiety, panic attacks, and confusion. In most cases, tramadol withdrawal will set in 12–20 hours after the last dose, but this can vary. Tramadol withdrawal typically lasts longer than that of other opioids. Seven days or more of acute withdrawal symptoms can occur as opposed to typically 3 or 4 days for other codeine analogs.

== Overdose ==
The clinical presentation in overdose cases can vary but typically includes neurological, cardiovascular, and gastrointestinal manifestations. The predominant neurological symptoms are seizures and altered levels of consciousness, ranging from somnolence to coma. Seizures are particularly notable due to tramadol's lowering of the seizure threshold, occurring in approximately half of acute poisoning cases. Patients often exhibit tachycardia and mild hypertension. Gastrointestinal disturbances such as nausea and vomiting are common, and agitation, anxiety, and cold and clammy skin may also be present.

While less common, severe complications like respiratory depression and serotonin syndrome can occur, particularly in polydrug overdoses involving other CNS depressants (such as benzodiazepines, opioids, and alcohol) and agents with serotonergic activity. Additionally, individuals with genetic variations leading to CYP2D6 enzyme duplication (rapid metabolizers) may have an increased risk of adverse effects, due to faster conversion of tramadol to its active metabolite.

Acute tramadol overdose is generally not life-threatening, with most fatalities resulting from polysubstance overdose. Management includes cardiovascular monitoring, activated charcoal administration, hydration, and treatment of seizures. Naloxone, an opioid antagonist, can partially reverse some effects of tramadol overdose, particularly respiratory depression. Its use may increase the risk of seizures due to unopposed alpha-adrenergic stimulation, but some studies suggest naloxone may not significantly increase risk of seizure in acute overdose. For suspected serotonin syndrome, cyproheptadine, a serotonin antagonist, is considered an effective antidote.

The incidence of tramadol-related overdose deaths has been on the rise in certain regions. For instance, Northern Ireland has reported an increased frequency of such cases. In 2013, England and Wales recorded 254 tramadol-related deaths, while Florida reported 379 cases in 2011. In 2011, 21,649 emergency room visits in the United States were related to tramadol. The likely explanation for these observations is due to increase in frequency of prescriptions and use due to easier access due to lighter regulatory scheduling by authorities but this is starting to change. In 2021, Health Canada announced tramadol would be added to Schedule I of the Controlled Drugs and Substances Act and to the Narcotic Control Regulations due to tramadol being suspected of having contributed to 18 reported deaths in Canada between 2006 and 2017.

== Interactions ==
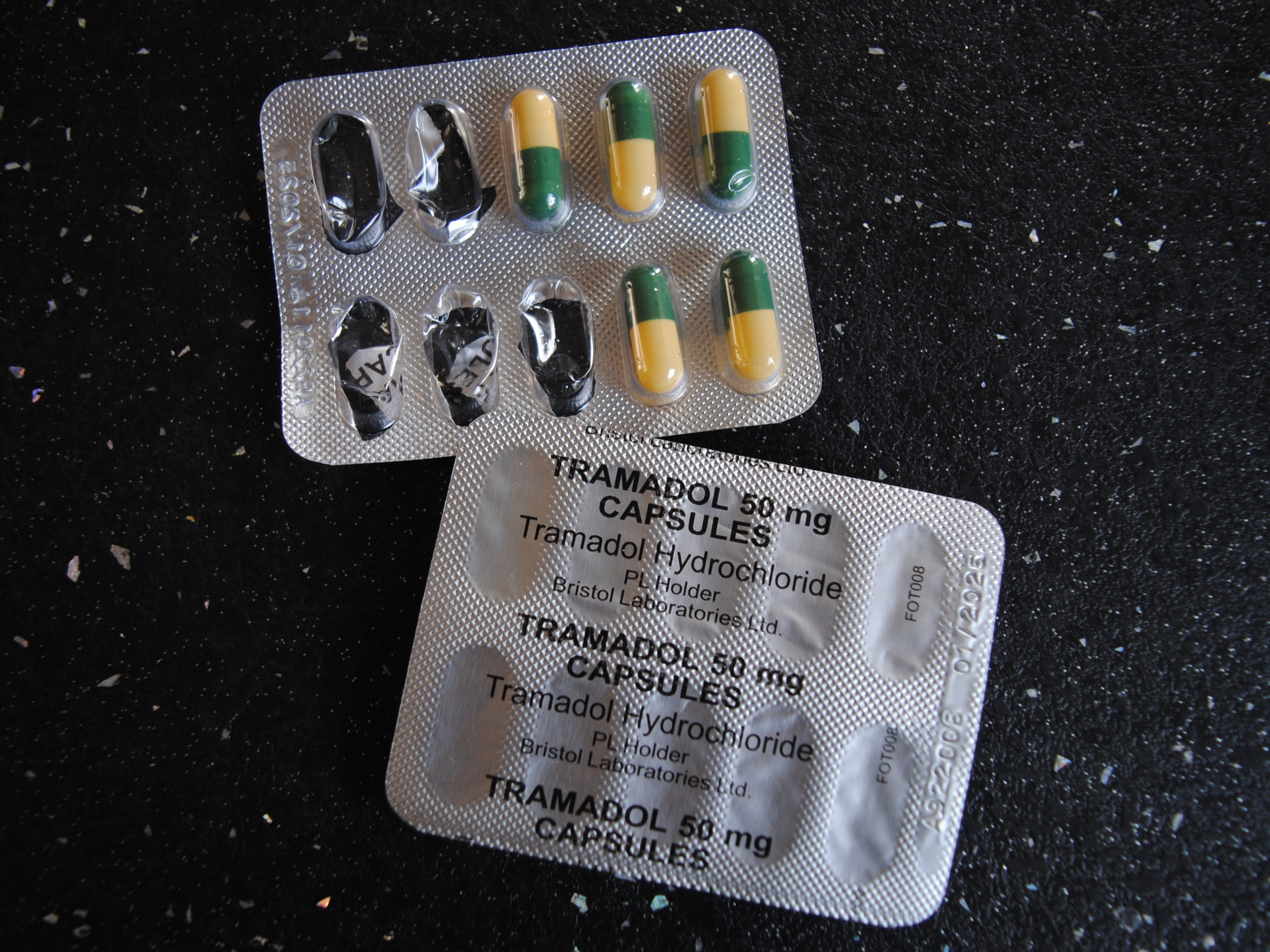
Tramadol hydrochloride (50 mg) capsules made by Bristol Laboratories and provided by a pharmacy in England

Tramadol can have pharmacodynamic, pharmacokinetic, and pharmacogenetic interactions.

Tramadol is metabolized by CYP2D6 enzymes which contributes to the metabolism of approximately 25% of all medications. Any medications with the ability to inhibit or induce these enzymes may interact with tramadol. These include common antiarrhythmics, antiemetics, antidepressants (sertraline, paroxetine, and fluoxetine in particular), antipsychotics, analgesics, and tamoxifen.-

Due to tramadol's serotonergic effects, tramadol has the potential to contribute to the development of an acute or chronic hyper-serotonin state called serotonin syndrome when used concurrently with other pro-serotonergic medications such as antidepressants (SSRIs, SNRIs, tricyclics, MAOIs), antipsychotics, triptans, cold medications containing dextromethorphan, and some herbal products such as St. John's wort.

Concurrent use of 5-HT3 antagonists such as ondansetron, dolasetron, and palonosetron may reduce the effectiveness of both drugs.

Tramadol also acts as an opioid agonist and thus can increase the risk for side effects when used with other opioid and opioid-containing analgesics (such as morphine, pethidine, tapentadol, oxycodone, fentanyl, and Tylenol 3).

Tramadol increases the risk for seizures by lowering the seizure threshold. Using other medications that lower seizure threshold – such as antipsychotic medications, bupropion (an anti-depressant and smoking cessation drug), and amphetamines – can further increase this risk.

== Pharmacology ==
=== Mechanism of action ===
Tramadol induces analgesic effects through a variety of different targets on the noradrenergic system, serotonergic system, and opioid receptors system. Tramadol affects serotonin and norepinephrine reuptake inhibition similarly to certain antidepressants known as serotonin–norepinephrine reuptake inhibitors (SNRIs), such as venlafaxine and duloxetine. Tramadol exists as a racemic mixture, the positive enantiomer inhibits serotonin reuptake while the negative enantiomer inhibits noradrenaline re-uptake, by binding to and blocking the transporters. Both enantiomers of tramadol are agonists of the μ-opioid receptor and its M1 metabolite, O-desmetramadol, is also a μ-opioid receptor agonist but is 6 times more potent than tramadol itself. All of these actions may work synergistically to induce analgesia.

Tramadol (and metabolite)
Site	Tramadol	DSMT	Species	Ref
MOR	1,600–12,486; 2,120–8,300 ≥1,000 (EC_{50})	5.4–18.6; 17 ((+)) ≥240 (EC_{50})	Human; Rat; Human	
DOR	>10,000; 57,600–100,000	≥2,900; 690 (+))	Human; Rat	
KOR	>10,000; 42,700–81,000	≥450; 1,800 (+))	Human; Rat	
SERT	~900 (IC_{50}); 992–1,190	>20,000 (IC_{50}); 2,980 ((−)) (IC_{50})	Human; Rat	
NET	14,600; 785	1,080 (−) (IC_{50}); 860 (IC_{50})	Human; Rat	
DAT	>100,000	>20,000	Rat	
5-HT_{1A}	>20,000	>20,000	Rat	
5-HT_{2A}	>20,000	>20,000	Rat	
5-HT_{2C}	1,000 (IC_{50})	1,300 (IC_{50})	Rat	
5-HT_{3}	>20,000	>20,000	Rat	
NK_{1}	IA	?	Rat	
M_{1}	>20,000; 3,400 (IC_{50})	>20,000; 2,000 (IC_{50})	Rat; Multiple	
M_{2}	ND	ND	ND	ND
M_{3}	1,000 (IC_{50})	IA	Human	
M_{4}	ND	ND	ND	ND
M_{5}	ND	ND	ND	ND
α7	7,400	ND	Chicken	
σ_{1}	>10,000	ND	Rat	
σ_{2}	>10,000	ND	Rat	
NMDAR	16,400 (IC_{50})	16,500 (IC_{50})	Human	
NMDAR (MK-801)	>20,000	>20,000	Rat	
GABA_{A}	>100,000 (IC_{50})	>100,000 (IC_{50})	Human	
GlyR	>100,000 (IC_{50})	>100,000 (IC_{50})	Human	
TRPA1	100– 10,000 (SI)	1,000– 10,000 (SI)	Human	
TRPV1	>10,000 (IC_{50})	>10,000 (IC_{50})	Human	
Values are K_{i} (nM), unless otherwise noted. The smaller the value, the more strongly the drug binds to the site.

Tramadol and mono- amine reuptake/release
Action	Value
5-HT reuptake	1,820
5-HT release	>10,000
NE reuptake	2,770
NE release	>10,000
DA reuptake	>10,000
DA release	>10,000
Values for reuptake inhibition are K_{i} (nM) and for release induction are EC_{50} (nM)

Tramadol has been found to possess these actions:

- Agonist of the μ-opioid receptor (MOR) and to a far lesser extent of the δ-opioid receptor (DOR) and κ-opioid receptor (KOR)
- Serotonin reuptake inhibitor (SRI) and norepinephrine reuptake inhibitor; hence, an SNRI
- Serotonin 5-HT_{2C} receptor antagonist
- M_{1} and M_{3} muscarinic acetylcholine receptor antagonist
- α7 nicotinic acetylcholine receptor antagonist
- NMDA receptor antagonist (very weak)
- TRPA1 inhibitor

Tramadol acts on the opioid receptors through its major active metabolite desmetramadol, which has as much as 700-fold higher affinity for the MOR relative to tramadol. Moreover, tramadol itself has been found to possess no efficacy in activating the MOR in functional activity assays, whereas desmetramadol activates the receptor with high intrinsic activity (E_{max} equal to that of morphine). As such, desmetramadol is exclusively responsible for the opioid effects of tramadol. Both tramadol and desmetramadol have pronounced selectivity for the MOR over the DOR and KOR in terms of binding affinity.

Tramadol is well-established as an SRI. In addition, a few studies have found that it also acts as a serotonin releasing agent (1–10 μM), similar in effect to fenfluramine. The serotonin releasing effects of tramadol could be blocked by sufficiently high concentrations of the serotonin reuptake inhibitor 6-nitroquipazine, which is in accordance with other serotonin releasing agents such as fenfluramine and MDMA. However, two more recent studies failed to find a releasing effect of tramadol at respective concentrations up to 10 and 30 μM. In addition to serotonergic activity, tramadol is also a norepinephrine reuptake inhibitor. It is not a norepinephrine releasing agent. Tramadol does not inhibit the reuptake or induce the release of dopamine.

A positron emission tomography imaging study found that single oral 50-mg and 100-mg doses of tramadol to human volunteers resulted in 34.7% and 50.2% respective mean occupation of the serotonin transporter (SERT) in the thalamus. The estimated median effective dose (ED_{50}) for SERT occupancy hence was 98.1 mg, which was associated with a plasma tramadol level of about 330 ng/mL (1,300 nM). The estimated maximum daily dosage of tramadol of 400 mg (100 mg q.i.d.) would result in as much as 78.7% occupancy of the SERT (in association with a plasma concentration of 1,220 ng/mL or 4,632 nM). This is close to that of SSRIs, which occupy the SERT by 80% or more.

Peak plasma concentrations during treatment with clinical dosages of tramadol have generally been found to be in the range of 70 to 592 ng/mL (266–2,250 nM) for tramadol and 55 to 143 ng/mL (221–573 nM) for desmetramadol. The highest levels of tramadol were observed with the maximum oral daily dosage of 400 mg per day divided into one 100-mg dose every 6 hours (i.e., four 100-mg doses evenly spaced out per day). Some accumulation of tramadol occurs with chronic administration; peak plasma levels with the maximum oral daily dosage (100 mg q.i.d.) are about 16% higher and the area-under-the-curve levels 36% higher than following a single oral 100-mg dose. Positron emission tomography imaging studies have reportedly found that tramadol levels are at least four-fold higher in the brain than in plasma. Conversely, brain levels of desmetramadol "only slowly approach those in plasma". The plasma protein binding of tramadol is only 4–20%; hence, almost all tramadol in circulation is free, thus bioactive.

==== Correspondence to effects ====
Co-administration of quinidine, a potent CYP2D6 enzyme inhibitor, with tramadol, a combination which results in markedly reduced levels of desmetramadol, was found not to significantly affect the analgesic effects of tramadol in human volunteers. However, other studies have found that the analgesic effects of tramadol are significantly decreased or even absent in CYP2D6 poor metabolizers. The analgesic effects of tramadol are only partially reversed by naloxone in human volunteers, hence indicating that its opioid action is unlikely the sole factor; tramadol's analgesic effects are also partially reversed by α_{2}-adrenergic receptor antagonists such as yohimbine, the 5-HT_{3} receptor antagonist ondansetron, and the 5-HT_{7} receptor antagonists SB-269970 and SB-258719. Pharmacologically, tramadol is similar to tapentadol and methadone in that it not only binds to the MOR, but also inhibits the reuptake of serotonin and norepinephrine due to its action on the noradrenergic and serotonergic systems, such as its "atypical" opioid activity.

Tramadol has inhibitory actions on the 5-HT_{2C} receptor. Antagonism of 5-HT_{2C} could be partially responsible for tramadol's reducing effect on depressive and obsessive–compulsive symptoms in patients with pain and co-morbid neurological illnesses. 5-HT_{2C} blockade may also account for its lowering of the seizure threshold, as 5-HT_{2C} knockout mice display significantly increased vulnerability to epileptic seizures, sometimes resulting in spontaneous death. However, the reduction of seizure threshold could be attributed to tramadol's putative inhibition of GABA_{A} receptors at high doses (significant inhibition at 100 μM). In addition, desmetramadol is a high-affinity ligand of the DOR, and activation of this receptor could be involved in tramadol's ability to provoke seizures in some individuals, as DOR agonists are well known for inducing seizures.

Nausea and vomiting caused by tramadol are thought to be due to activation of the 5-HT_{3} receptor via increased serotonin levels. In accordance, the 5-HT_{3} receptor antagonist ondansetron can be used to treat tramadol-associated nausea and vomiting. Tramadol and desmetramadol themselves do not bind to the 5-HT_{3} receptor.

=== Pharmacokinetics ===
Desmetramadol

Tramadol is metabolised in the liver via the cytochrome P450 isozyme CYP2B6, CYP2D6, and CYP3A4, being O- and N-demethylated to five different metabolites. Of these, desmetramadol (O-desmethyltramadol) is the most significant, since it has 200 times the μ-affinity of (+)-tramadol, and furthermore has an elimination half-life of 9 hours, compared with 6 hours for tramadol itself. As with codeine, in the 6% of the population who have reduced CYP2D6 activity (hence reducing metabolism), a reduced analgesic effect is seen. Those with decreased CYP2D6 activity require a dose increase of 30% to achieve the same degree of pain relief as those with a normal level of CYP2D6 activity.

Phase II hepatic metabolism renders the metabolites water-soluble, which are excreted by the kidneys. Thus, reduced doses may be used in renal and hepatic impairment.

Its volume of distribution is around 306 L after oral administration and 203 L after parenteral administration.

== Chemistry ==
Tramadol is marketed as a racemic mixture of both R- and S-stereoisomers, because the two isomers complement each other's analgesic activities. The (+)-isomer is predominantly active as an opiate with a higher affinity for the μ-opiate receptor (20 times higher affinity than the (-)-isomer).

=== Synthesis and stereoisomerism ===
(1R,2R)-tramadol	(1S,2S)-tramadol
(1R,2S)-tramadol	(1S,2R)-tramadol

The chemical synthesis of tramadol is described in the literature. Tramadol [2-(dimethylaminomethyl)-1-(3-methoxyphenyl)cyclohexanol] has two stereogenic centers at the cyclohexane ring. Thus, 2-(dimethylaminomethyl)-1-(3-methoxyphenyl)cyclohexanol may exist in four different configurational forms:

- (1R,2R)-isomer
- (1S,2S)-isomer
- (1R,2S)-isomer
- (1S,2R)-isomer

The synthetic pathway leads to the racemate (1:1 mixture) of (1R,2R)-isomer and the (1S,2S)-isomer as the main products. Minor amounts of the racemic mixture of the (1R,2S)-isomer and the (1S,2R)-isomer are formed as well. The isolation of the (1R,2R)-isomer and the (1S,2S)-isomer from the diastereomeric minor racemate [(1R,2S)-isomer and (1S,2R)-isomer] is realized by the recrystallization of the hydrochlorides. The drug tramadol is a racemate of the hydrochlorides of the (1R,2R)-(+)- and the (1S,2S)-(−)-enantiomers. The resolution of the racemate [(1R,2R)-(+)-isomer / (1S,2S)-(−)-isomer] was described employing (R)-(−)- or (S)-(+)-mandelic acid. This process does not find industrial application, since tramadol is used as a racemate, despite known different physiological effects of the (1R,2R)- and (1S,2S)-isomers, because the racemate showed higher analgesic activity than either enantiomer in animals and in humans.

=== Detection in biological fluids ===
Tramadol and desmetramadol may be quantified in blood, plasma, serum, or saliva to monitor for abuse, confirm a diagnosis of poisoning or assist in the forensic investigation of a sudden death. Most commercial opiate immunoassay screening tests do not cross-react significantly with tramadol or its major metabolites, so chromatographic techniques must be used to detect and quantify these substances. The concentration of desmetramadol in the blood or plasma of a person who has taken tramadol is generally 10–20% that of the parent drug.

=== Discrepant reports on natural agency ===
In 2013, researchers Michel de Waard (then at Université Joseph Fourier, Grenoble and Grenoble Institute of Neuroscience, La Tronche) reported in Angewandte Chemie that tramadol was found in relatively high concentrations (>1%) in the roots of the African pin cushion tree, Nauclea latifolia, concluding that it was a natural product in addition to its being a later human synthetic, and presenting a putative biosynthetic hypothesis for its origin.

In 2014, Michael Spiteller (Technische Universität Dortmund) and collaborators reported results, also in Angewandte Chemie, that supported the conclusion that the presence of tramadol in those tree roots was the result of tramadol having been ingested by humans and having been administered to cattle (by farmers in the region); Spiteller et al. presented data that tramadol and its metabolites were present in animal excreta, which they then argue contaminated soil around the trees. They further observed that tramadol and its mammalian metabolites were found in tree roots in the far north of Cameroon where the commercial drug was in use, but not in the south where it was not being administered.

In 2016, Spiteller and colleagues followed up their preceding work with a radiocarbon analysis that supported their contention that the tramadol found in N. latifolia roots was of human synthetic origin rather being plant-derived.

== Society and culture ==
=== Formulations ===
Available dosage forms include liquids, syrups, drops, elixirs, effervescent tablets, and powders for mixing with water, capsules, tablets including extended-release formulations, suppositories, compounding powder, and injections.

=== Brand names ===
- Tilodol - UK

=== Patent history ===
The U.S. Food and Drug Administration (FDA) approved tramadol in March 1995, and an extended-release (ER) formulation in September 2005. ER Tramadol was protected by US patents nos. 6,254,887 and 7,074,430. The FDA listed the patents' expiration as 10 May 2014. However, in August 2009, the US District Court for the District of Delaware ruled the patents invalid, a decision upheld the following year by the Court of Appeals for the Federal Circuit. Manufacture and distribution of generic equivalents of Ultram ER in the United States was therefore permitted before the expiration of the patents.

=== Legal status ===
Effective August 2014, tramadol has been placed into Schedule IV of the federal Controlled Substances Act in the United States. Before that, some US states had already classified tramadol as a Schedule IV controlled substance under their respective state laws.

Tramadol is classified in Schedule 4 (prescription only) in Australia, rather than as a Schedule 8 Controlled Drug (possession without authority illegal) like most other opioids.

Effective May 2008, Sweden classified tramadol as a controlled substance in the same category as codeine and dextropropoxyphene, but allows a normal prescription to be used. In June 2014, the United Kingdom's Home Office classified tramadol as a Class C, Schedule 3 controlled drug, but exempted it from the safe custody requirement. In October 2023, New Zealand's Medsafe reclassified tramadol as a Class C2 Controlled Drug (in addition to its existing status as a prescription only medication). Effective 22 August 2025, the government of Liberia increased regulations on tramadol. Its use was "strictly limited to licensed hospital settings under the direct supervision of professional medical staff" according to the Liberian Observer. Liberian health authorities claimed that tramadol was the "most widely abused drug" in the country.

=== In sport ===
The WADA has prohibited the use of tramadol in competition since 1 January 2024.

Misuse of painkillers is up to four times more common among athletes compared to the general population. From March 2019, the Union Cycliste Internationale (UCI) banned the drug, after riders were using the painkiller to improve their performance. No significant improvements in performance were found when compared to placebo.

In 2026 the International Go Federation (IGF) revoked Korean player Sa Woo Kim’s third place in the 2025 World Amateur Go Championship in Vancouver, Canada because he had tested positive for tramadol. The IGF adopted the World Anti-Doping Code in October 2020.

=== In war ===
Illicit use of the drug is thought to be a major factor in the success of the Boko Haram terrorist organization. When used at higher doses, the drug "can produce similar effects to heroin." One former member said, "whenever we took tramadol, nothing mattered to us anymore except what we were sent to do because it made us very high and very bold, it was impossible to go on a mission without taking it." Tramadol is also used as a coping mechanism in the Gaza Strip. In the 2020s Anti-balaka militias in the Central African Republic were reported to be in control of the Tramadol trade, providing it to fighters and workers in illegal goldmines; and organising its sale at local markets. Researchers report that the drug is brought by Dubai based company Shalina from India and China to the Democratic Republic of the Congo, from where it is smuggled into the Central African Republic.

=== Other abuse ===
Tramadol, usually obtained on prescription, is also abused in the United Kingdom, particularly "to relax, to sleep, to get high or to relieve boredom".

In Indonesia, illicit tramadol as well as other psychotropic pharmaceuticals, like trihexyphenidyl, alprazolam, and clonazepam, are commonly sold by dealers masquerading as cosmetics stores that coordinate with corrupt members of law enforcement and NGOs.

== Research ==
Investigational uses of tramadol that are or have been researched include:

- Diabetic neuropathy
- Antidepressant
- Postherpetic neuralgia
- Adjunct to local anesthesia

== Veterinary medicine ==
Tramadol was the most common opioid prescribed by American veterinarians from 2014 to 2019; however, usage has declined in subsequent years due to more recent evidence suggesting that dogs do not metabolise tramadol into O-desmethyltramadol effectively. As metabolisation of tramadol relies on cytochrome P450 enzymes, it is species dependent and even individual genetics can have a profound impact on the efficacy of tramadol. A 2021 meta-analysis of tramadol use in dogs found that although tramadol was more effective than nalbuphine and codeine, it was less effective than methadone, COX inhibitors and multimodal analgesia with poor evidence to support the use of it is an analgesic for dogs. The mean alveolar concentration sparing effect of tramadol is negligible and with a high likelihood of rescue analgesia being required thus tramadol monotherapy is not recommended for the dog. One study looking at tramadol and meloxicam administered preoperatively provided no benefit compared to meloxicam given alone. Another study looking at cimicoxib versus tramadol for long-term post-operative pain following a tibial-plateau-levelling osteotomy found that although the level of analgesia was similar cimicoxib resulted in better mobility and a lower incidence of hock oedema. These studies and other evidence suggest that non-steroidal anti-inflammatory drugs provide superior analgesia to tramadol in dogs.

Tramadol is more effective in cats although oral tramadol is poorly tolerated leading to low compliance. A transdermal gel was formulated to address this but plasma concentrations were undetectable. In cats oral tramadol at 6 mg/kg provides equivalent analgesia to intramuscular tramadol at 4 mg/kg. One study comparing tramadol to meperidine found tramadol to be more effective at providing analgesia for cats undergoing ovariohysterectomy. A study looking at treatment of osteoarthritis in geriatric cats found owner-reported improvements but also significant adverse effects. Reported adverse effects of tramadol include: diarrhoea, dysphoria, anorexia, tachycardia, pyrexia, tachypnoea, and increased levels of serotonin leading to agitation. Tramadol has the potential to cause serotonin syndrome when administered alongside serotonin re-uptake inhibitors, monoamine oxidase inhibitors, and tricyclic antidepressants.

In horses, tramadol is ineffective by itself. Two studies looking at intravenous tramadol found it provided no thermal or mechanical antinociception, another study looking at oral tramadol for chronic laminitis found it provided minimal analgesia, and another study looking at intraarticular tramadol found it provided no post-operative analgesia following arthroscopy; however, when administered with paracetamol (acetaminophen) tramadol provides short-acting mechanical antinociception and when administered with ketamine oral tramadol provides adequate analgesia for chronic laminitis. Based on this evidence tramadol is not recommended to be provided on its own for analgesia in horses.

Pharmacokinetics of tramadol across the species
Species	Half-life (h) for parent drug	Half-life (h) for desmetramadol	Maximum plasma concentration (ng/mL) for parent drug	Maximum plasma concentration (ng/mL) for desmetramadol
Camel	3.2 (IM), 1.3 (IV)	–	0.44 (IV)	–
Cat	3.40 (oral), 2.23 (IV)	4.82 (oral), 4.35 (IV)	914 (oral), 1323 (IV)	655 (oral), 366 (IV)
Dog	1.71 (oral), 1.80 (IV), 2.24 (rectal)	2.18 (oral), 90-5000 (IV)	1402.75 (oral)	449.13 (oral), 90–350 (IV)
Donkey	4.2 (oral), 1.5 (IV)	–	2817 (oral)	–
Goat	2.67 (oral), 0.94 (IV)	–	542.9 (oral)	–
Horses	1.29–1.53 (IV), 10.1 (oral)	4 (oral)	637 (IV), 256 (oral)	47 (oral)
Llama	2.54 (IM), 2.12 (IV)	7.73 (IM), 10.4 (IV)	4036 (IV), 1360 (IM)	158 (IV), 158 (IM)

== See also ==
- Tramadol/paracetamol
