= Imidazolylindole =

Imidazolylindoles are a group of cyclized tryptamines in which the amine has been cyclized into an imidazole ring. They include AGH-107, AGH-192, AGH-194 and AH-494. These compounds are known to act as selective serotonin 5-HT_{7} receptor agonists.

Chemical structures of selected imidazolylindoles
AGH-107

AGH-192

AGH-194

AH-494

== See also ==
- Cyclized tryptamine
