= AS-19 =

AS-19 may refer to:

- AS-19 (drug), a drug used to improve long-term memory
- Kh-80, a Soviet cruise missile known to NATO as the AS-19 Koala
- USS Proteus (AS-19), a United States Navy submarine tender in commission from 1944 to 1947, 1960 to 1992, and 1994 to 1999
