= AGH-194 =

Chemical compound

Clinical data
- Other names: AGH194
- Drug class: Serotonin 5-HT_{7} receptor agonist
- ATC code: None

Identifiers
- IUPAC name: 3-(3-methylimidazol-4-yl)-4-fluoro-5-iodo-1H-indole
- PubChem CID: 139488659

Chemical and physical data
- Formula: C_{12}H_{9}FIN_{3}
- Molar mass: 341.128 g·mol^{−1}
- 3D model (JSmol): Interactive image
- SMILES: CN1C=NC=C1C2=CNC3=C2C(=C(C=C3)I)F
- InChI: InChI=InChI=1S/C12H9FIN3/c1-17-6-15-5-10(17)7-4-16-9-3-2-8(14)12(13)11(7)9/h2-6,16H,1H3; Key:JPIPFKIBJTYVGY-UHFFFAOYSA-N

AGH-194 is a potent and selective, water-soluble, orally bioavailable and brain penetrant full agonist at the serotonin 5-HT_{7} receptor of the imidazolylindole family, closely related to AGH-192. In animal tests, prolonged administration led to depressive-like behavioral changes.

== See also ==
- Cyclized tryptamine
- Imidazolylindole
- AGH-192
- AGH-107
- AH-494
