= O-Methylpellotine =

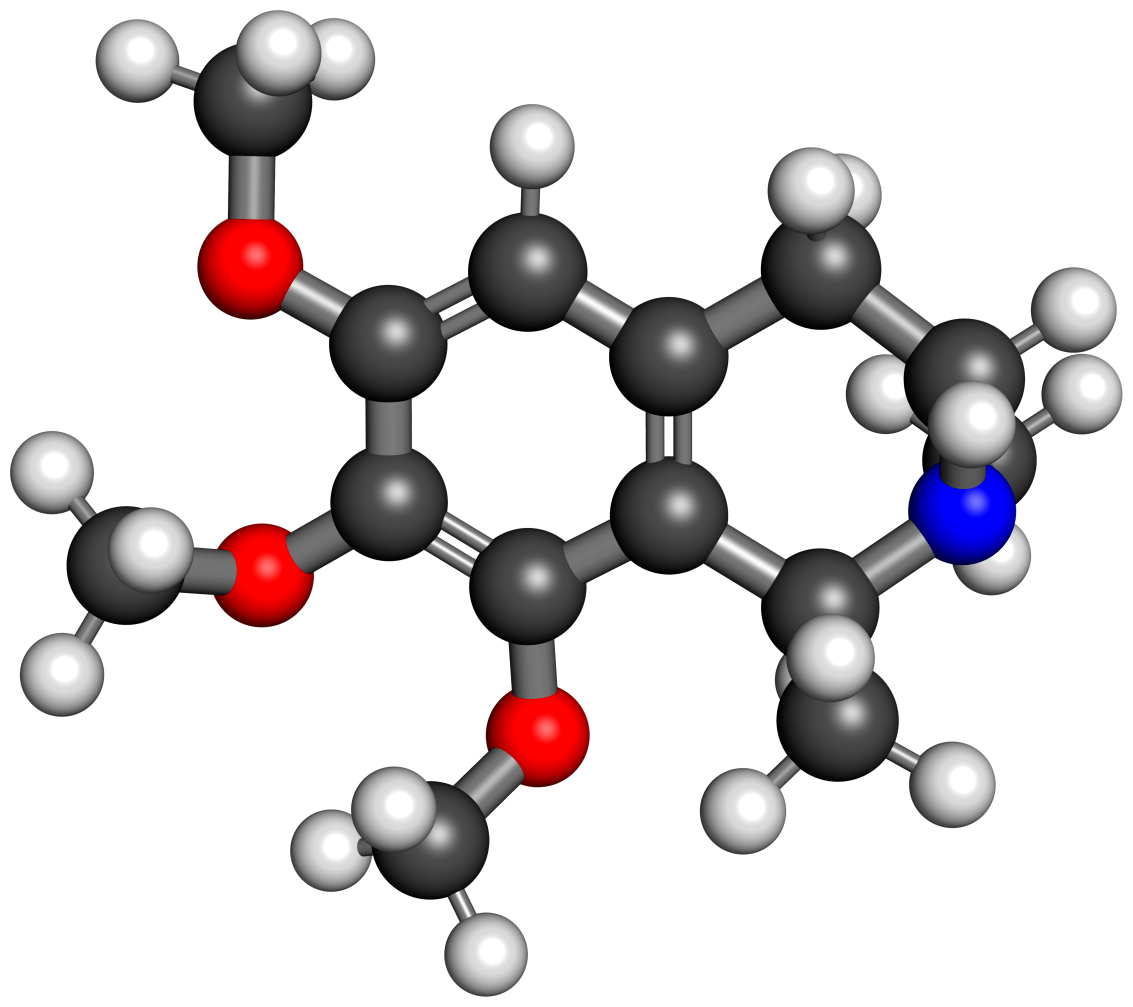

Clinical data
- Other names: 6,7,8-Trimethoxy-1,2-dimethyl-1,2,3,4-tetrahydroisoquinoline; Pellotine methyl ester; 1,N-Dimethylanhalinine
- Drug class: Serotonin 5-HT_{7} receptor inverse agonist
- ATC code: None

Identifiers
- IUPAC name: 6,7,8-trimethoxy-1,2-dimethyl-3,4-dihydro-1H-isoquinoline
- CAS Number: 4973-61-9
- PubChem CID: 616880
- ChemSpider: 536123
- ChEMBL: ChEMBL1185759

Chemical and physical data
- Formula: C_{14}H_{21}NO_{3}
- Molar mass: 251.326 g·mol^{−1}
- 3D model (JSmol): Interactive image
- SMILES: CC1C2=C(C(=C(C=C2CCN1C)OC)OC)OC
- InChI: InChI=1S/C14H21NO3/c1-9-12-10(6-7-15(9)2)8-11(16-3)13(17-4)14(12)18-5/h8-9H,6-7H2,1-5H3; Key:SDLPOZWCCRGUOA-UHFFFAOYSA-N

O-Methylpellotine, also known as 1,N-dimethylanhalinine, is a tetrahydroisoquinoline alkaloid found in various cactus species, such as Lophophora diffusa and Pachycereus weberi. It has been found to act as an inverse agonist of the serotonin 5-HT_{7} receptor.

== See also ==
- Substituted tetrahydroisoquinoline
- Pellotine
- Anhalinine
- N-Methylanhalinine
- O-Methylanhalonidine
