= Adolan =

Adolan may refer to:

- Tramadol, sold under the trade name Adolan
- Methadone, also sold under the trade name Adolan
