= DR-4485 =

Chemical compound

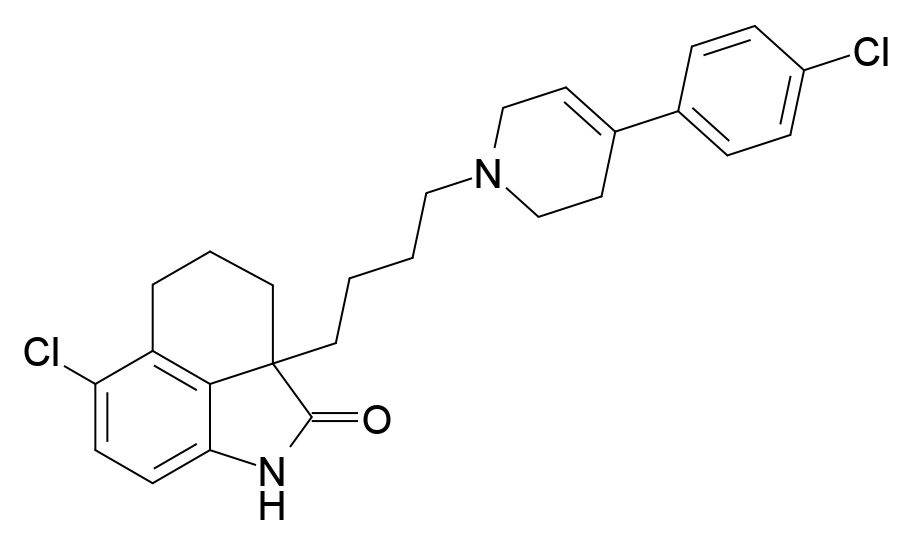

Identifiers
- IUPAC name: 6-chloro-2a-(4-[4-(4-chlorophenyl)-3,6-dihydro-1(2H)-pyridinyl]butyl)-2a,3,4,5-tetrahydrobenz[cd]indol-2(1H)one
- CAS Number: 402942-53-4
- PubChem CID: 9911844
- ChemSpider: 8087495
- UNII: 5BJV5NUM68
- CompTox Dashboard (EPA): DTXSID901031962

Chemical and physical data
- Formula: C_{26}H_{28}Cl_{2}N_{2}O
- Molar mass: 455.42 g·mol^{−1}
- 3D model (JSmol): Interactive image
- SMILES: c4cc(Cl)ccc4C(CC5)=CCN5CCCCC2(CCC3)c1c3c(Cl)ccc1NC2=O
- InChI: InChI=1S/C26H28Cl2N2O/c27-20-7-5-18(6-8-20)19-11-16-30(17-12-19)15-2-1-13-26-14-3-4-21-22(28)9-10-23(24(21)26)29-25(26)31/h5-11H,1-4,12-17H2,(H,29,31); Key:SBTRHJHOLCAPFT-UHFFFAOYSA-N

DR-4485 is a compound which acts as a potent and selective antagonist for the 5-HT_{7} receptor, with good oral bioavailability. It has been used to research the function of this still comparatively little studied serotonin receptor subtype.
