= AH-494 =

Chemical compound

Clinical data
- Other names: AH494
- ATC code: None

Identifiers
- IUPAC name: 3‐(1‐ethyl‐1H‐imidazol‐5‐yl)‐1H‐indole‐5‐carboxamide
- CAS Number: 2172907-22-9
- PubChem CID: 138691364
- ChemSpider: 68912051
- UNII: 7HG7TA6D63
- ChEMBL: ChEMBL4469847
- CompTox Dashboard (EPA): DTXSID601336553

Chemical and physical data
- Formula: C_{14}H_{14}N_{4}O
- Molar mass: 254.293 g·mol^{−1}
- 3D model (JSmol): Interactive image
- SMILES: CCN1C=NC=C1C2=CNC3=C2C=C(C=C3)C(=O)N
- InChI: InChI=1S/C14H14N4O/c1-2-18-8-16-7-13(18)11-6-17-12-4-3-9(14(15)19)5-10(11)12/h3-8,17H,2H2,1H3,(H2,15,19); Key:RXDHCCKYQJNUFV-UHFFFAOYSA-N

AH-494 is a potent and selective, water-soluble full agonist at the 5-HT_{7} serotonin receptor of the imidazolylindole family. It is a close derivative of the known chemical probe 5-Carboxamidotryptamine, as well as of the more lipophilic imidazolylindoles: AGH-107 and AGH-192. It has been shown to exhibit favorable ADMET profile in in-vitro assays.

== See also ==
- Cyclized tryptamine
- Imidazolylindole
- AGH-107
- AGH-192
- AGH-194
