= Tramadol/paracetamol =

Combination pain medication

Combination of
- Tramadol: opioid analgesic
- Paracetamol: Analgesics and antipyretics

Clinical data
- Trade names: Ultracet, Zaldiar
- AHFS/Drugs.com: Multum Consumer Information
- License data: US DailyMed: Tramadol and acetaminophen
- Pregnancy category: AU: C
- Routes of administration: By mouth
- ATC code: N02AJ13 (WHO)

Legal status
- Legal status: AU: S4 (Prescription only); CA: ℞-only; UK: POM (Prescription only); US: Schedule V; EU: Rx-only; Rx-only

Identifiers
- KEGG: D09999

Tramadol/paracetamol, also known as tramadol/acetaminophen and sold under the brand name Ultracet or Salpifar among others, is a fixed-dose combination medication used for the treatment of moderate to severe pain. It contains tramadol, as the hydrochloride, an analgesic; and paracetamol an analgesic. It is taken by mouth.
