= AGH-107 =

Chemical compound

Clinical data
- ATC code: None

Identifiers
- IUPAC name: 3-(3-ethylimidazol-4-yl)-5-iodo-1H-indole
- CAS Number: 2172907-10-5
- PubChem CID: 138691314
- ChemSpider: 64868965
- UNII: UA8DB5XZ56
- ChEMBL: ChEMBL4216263
- CompTox Dashboard (EPA): DTXSID701336320

Chemical and physical data
- Formula: C_{13}H_{12}IN_{3}
- Molar mass: 337.164 g·mol^{−1}
- 3D model (JSmol): Interactive image
- SMILES: CCn1cncc1-c1c[nH]c2ccc(I)cc12
- InChI: InChI=1S/C13H12IN3/c1-2-17-8-15-7-13(17)11-6-16-12-4-3-9(14)5-10(11)12/h3-8,16H,2H2,1H3; Key:JLCILCCDUVFIRF-UHFFFAOYSA-N

AGH-107 is a potent, selective, water-soluble and brain penetrant full agonist at the 5-HT_{7} serotonin receptor of the imidazolylindole family. AGH-107 is one of the few examples of low-basicity aminergic receptor agonists, which may underlie its high selectivity over the related central nervous system targets. AGH-107 was found to reverse the impairment in novel object recognition caused by MK-801 in mice. The relatively short half-life in rodents inhibited its use as a molecular probe.

== See also ==
- Cyclized tryptamine
- Imidazolylindole
- AH-494
- AGH-194
- AGH-192
