= AGH-192 =

Chemical compound

Clinical data
- Other names: AGH192
- ATC code: None

Identifiers
- IUPAC name: 3-(3-ethylimidazol-4-yl)-4-fluoro-5-iodo-1H-indole
- CAS Number: 2173387-57-8
- PubChem CID: 139488606
- ChemSpider: 127419353
- UNII: ZJ3VJS5PM7
- ChEMBL: ChEMBL4452569
- CompTox Dashboard (EPA): DTXSID301336542

Chemical and physical data
- Formula: C_{13}H_{11}FIN_{3}
- Molar mass: 355.155 g·mol^{−1}
- 3D model (JSmol): Interactive image
- SMILES: CCN1C=NC=C1C2=CNC3=C2C(=C(C=C3)I)F
- InChI: InChI=1S/C13H11FIN3/c1-2-18-7-16-6-11(18)8-5-17-10-4-3-9(15)13(14)12(8)10/h3-7,17H,2H2,1H3; Key:KBQLQDPQEMFGCB-UHFFFAOYSA-N

AGH-192 is a potent and selective, water-soluble, orally bioavailable and brain penetrant full agonist at the 5-HT_{7} serotonin receptor of the imidazolylindole family, derived from the older drug AGH-107. In animal tests it showed activity indicative of potential application in the treatment of neuropathic pain.

== See also ==
- Cyclized tryptamine
- Imidazolylindole
- AGH-194
- AGH-107
- AH-494
