= E-55888 =

Chemical compound

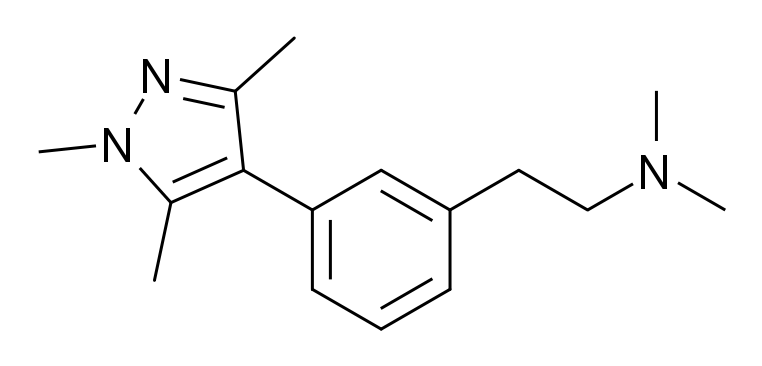

Identifiers
- IUPAC name: N,N-dimethyl-3-(1,3,5-trimethyl-1H-pyrazol-4-yl)phenethylamine
- CAS Number: 1034142-33-0
- PubChem CID: 24825775
- IUPHAR/BPS: 3929
- ChemSpider: 34980845
- UNII: 4KQ7F7PL4L
- ChEMBL: ChEMBL4205349
- CompTox Dashboard (EPA): DTXSID901029789

Chemical and physical data
- Formula: C_{16}H_{23}N_{3}
- Molar mass: 257.381 g·mol^{−1}
- 3D model (JSmol): Interactive image
- SMILES: Cn1nc(C)c(c1C)-c(c2)cccc2CCN(C)C
- InChI: InChI=1S/C16H23N3/c1-12-16(13(2)19(5)17-12)15-8-6-7-14(11-15)9-10-18(3)4/h6-8,11H,9-10H2,1-5H3; Key:MFUWRMRKXKCSPL-UHFFFAOYSA-N

E-55888 is a drug developed by Esteve, which acts as a potent and selective full agonist at the 5HT_{7} serotonin receptor, and is used for investigating the role of 5-HT_{7} receptors in the perception of pain. When administered by itself, E-55888 is anti-hyperalgesic but not analgesic, but when administered alongside morphine, E-55888 was found to significantly increase the analgesic effects.

== See also ==
- AS-19
- LP-12
- LP-44
- LP-211
