= LP-44 =

Chemical compound

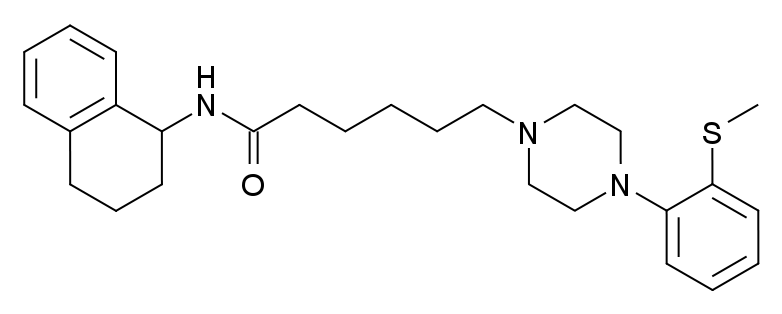

Identifiers
- IUPAC name: 4-[2-(methylthio)phenyl]-N-(1,2,3,4-tetrahydronaphthalen-1-yl)-1-piperazinehexanamide
- CAS Number: 824958-12-5
- PubChem CID: 11224758
- ChemSpider: 9399811
- UNII: M5K3JUP5EZ
- CompTox Dashboard (EPA): DTXSID50459307

Chemical and physical data
- Formula: C_{27}H_{37}N_{3}OS
- Molar mass: 451.67 g·mol^{−1}
- 3D model (JSmol): Interactive image
- SMILES: c3cccc2c3CCCC2NC(=O)CCCCCN(CC4)CCN4c1ccccc1SC
- InChI: InChI=1S/C27H37N3OS/c1-32-26-15-7-6-14-25(26)30-20-18-29(19-21-30)17-8-2-3-16-27(31)28-24-13-9-11-22-10-4-5-12-23(22)24/h4-7,10,12,14-15,24H,2-3,8-9,11,13,16-21H2,1H3,(H,28,31); Key:JNBBJUHCODFLEG-UHFFFAOYSA-N

LP-44 is a drug which acts as a potent and selective agonist at the 5HT_{7} serotonin receptor. While LP-44 is less selective than the related compound LP-12, it has been more widely used in research and has been used to show the complex role of 5-HT_{7} receptors in several aspects of brain function, including regulation of the sleep-wake cycle and roles in stress, learning and memory.

== See also ==
- AS-19
- E-55888
- LP-211
