= LP-211 =

Chemical compound

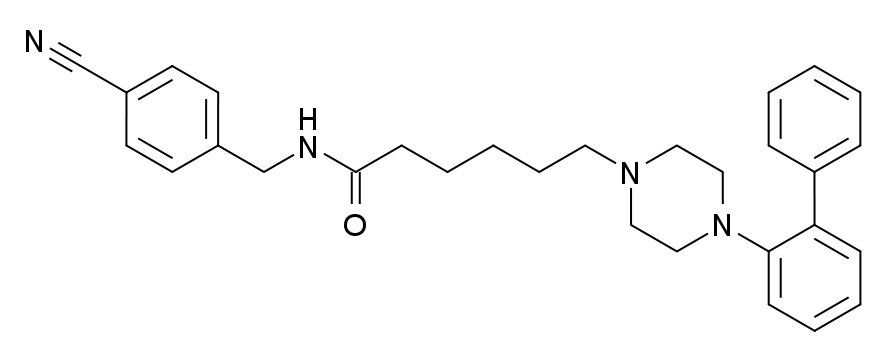

Identifiers
- IUPAC name: N-(4-cyanophenylmethyl)-4-(2-diphenyl)-1-piperazinehexanamide
- CAS Number: 1052147-86-0
- PubChem CID: 25107716
- ChemSpider: 23343345
- UNII: NCS2VAH93R
- CompTox Dashboard (EPA): DTXSID201029790

Chemical and physical data
- Formula: C_{30}H_{34}N_{4}O
- Molar mass: 466.629 g·mol^{−1}
- 3D model (JSmol): Interactive image
- SMILES: N#Cc3ccc(cc3)CNC(=O)CCCCCN(CC2)CCN2c1ccccc1-c4ccccc4
- InChI: InChI=1S/C30H34N4O/c31-23-25-14-16-26(17-15-25)24-32-30(35)13-5-2-8-18-33-19-21-34(22-20-33)29-12-7-6-11-28(29)27-9-3-1-4-10-27/h1,3-4,6-7,9-12,14-17H,2,5,8,13,18-22,24H2,(H,32,35); Key:BQEDZLDNNBDKDS-UHFFFAOYSA-N

LP-211 is a drug which acts as a potent and selective agonist at the 5HT_{7} serotonin receptor, with better brain penetration than older 5-HT_{7} agonists in the same series, and similar effects in animals.

== See also ==
- AS-19
- E-55888
- LP-12
- LP-44
