= LP-12 =

Drug

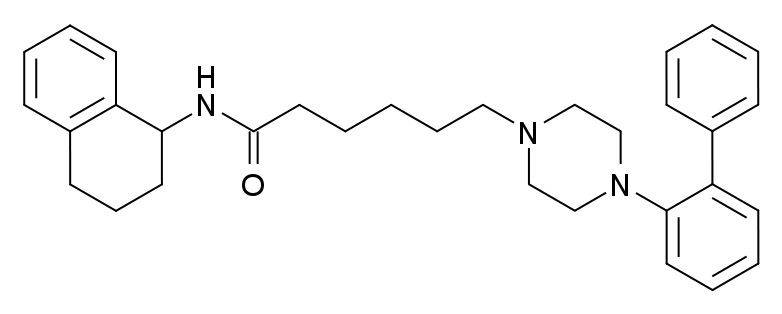

Identifiers
- IUPAC name: 4-(2-diphenyl)-N-(1,2,3,4-tetrahydronaphthalen-1-yl)-1-piperazinehexanamide
- CAS Number: 950725-03-8
- PubChem CID: 23643664
- IUPHAR/BPS: 8434
- ChemSpider: 22439715
- UNII: Q77EAZ9TG9
- ChEMBL: ChEMBL243954
- CompTox Dashboard (EPA): DTXSID301018118

Chemical and physical data
- Formula: C_{32}H_{39}N_{3}O
- Molar mass: 481.684 g·mol^{−1}
- 3D model (JSmol): Interactive image
- SMILES: C5CCc1ccccc1C5NC(=O)CCCCCN3CCN(CC3)c2ccccc2-c4ccccc4
- InChI: InChI=1S/C32H39N3O/c36-32(33-30-18-11-15-26-14-6-7-16-28(26)30)20-5-2-10-21-34-22-24-35(25-23-34)31-19-9-8-17-29(31)27-12-3-1-4-13-27/h1,3-4,6-9,12-14,16-17,19,30H,2,5,10-11,15,18,20-25H2,(H,33,36); Key:NMZIDFFHGCRAJV-UHFFFAOYSA-N

LP-12 is a drug which acts as a potent agonist at the 5HT_{7} serotonin receptor, with very high selectivity over other tested receptor subtypes such as the serotonin 5-HT_{1A} and 5-HT_{2A}, and the dopamine D_{2} receptor. It has been used to research the involvement of the 5-HT_{7} receptor in as yet poorly understood processes such as allodynia and hyperalgesia.

== See also ==
- AS-19
- E-55888
- LP-44
- LP-211
