= N-Methylanhalinine =

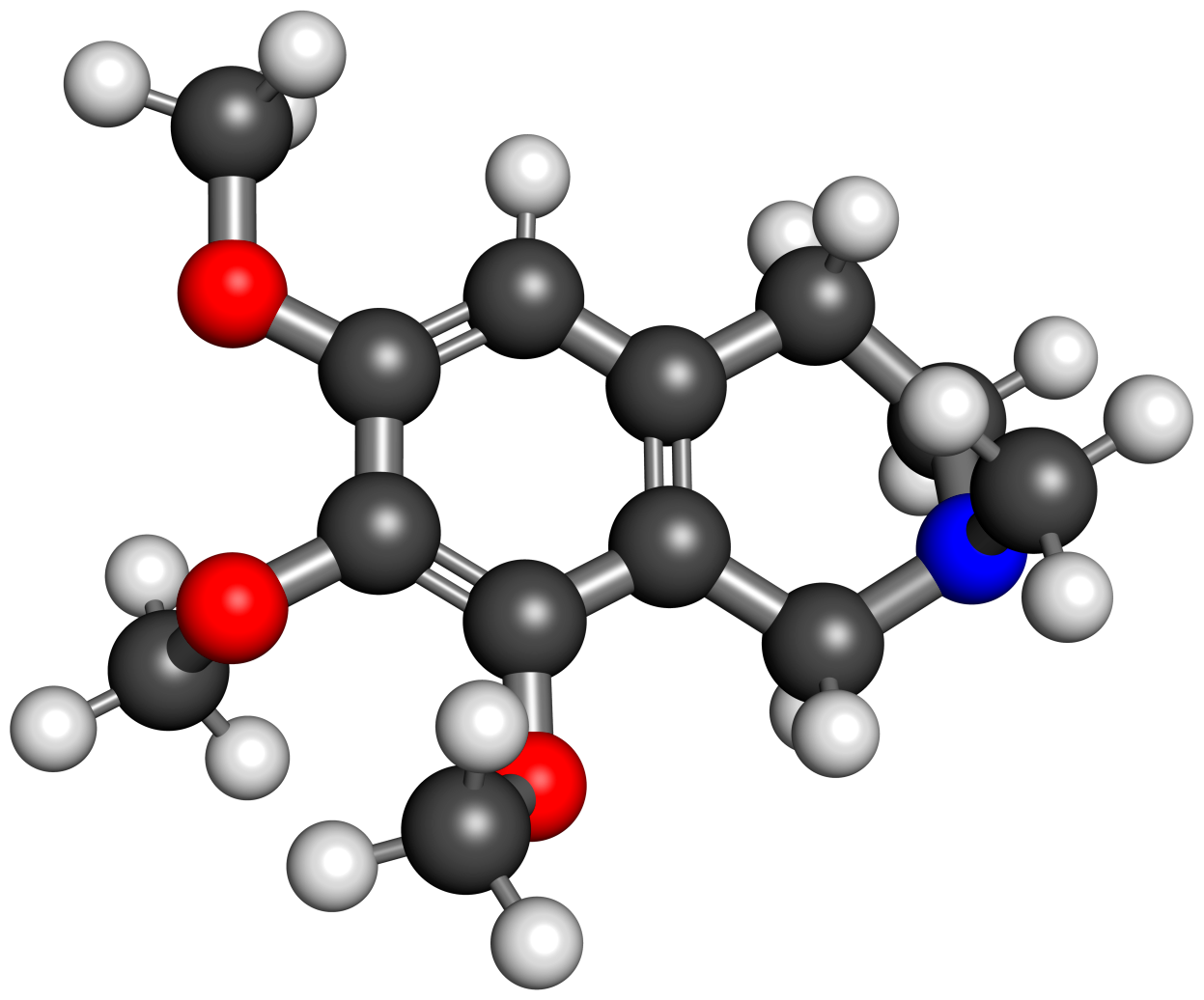

Clinical data
- Other names: 1,2,3,4-Tetrahydro-6,7,8-trimethoxy-2-methylisoquinoline; O-Methylanhalidine
- Drug class: Serotonin 5-HT_{7} receptor inverse agonist
- ATC code: None

Identifiers
- IUPAC name: 6,7,8-trimethoxy-2-methyl-3,4-dihydro-1H-isoquinoline
- PubChem CID: 616877
- ChemSpider: 536121

Chemical and physical data
- Formula: C_{13}H_{19}NO_{3}
- Molar mass: 237.299 g·mol^{−1}
- 3D model (JSmol): Interactive image
- SMILES: CN1CCC2=CC(=C(C(=C2C1)OC)OC)OC
- InChI: InChI=1S/C13H19NO3/c1-14-6-5-9-7-11(15-2)13(17-4)12(16-3)10(9)8-14/h7H,5-6,8H2,1-4H3; Key:WMHZXZCCGOMWEQ-UHFFFAOYSA-N

N-Methylanhalinine, also known as O-methylanhalidine, is a tetrahydroisoquinoline alkaloid found in various Turbinicarpus cactus species. It has been found to act as a potent inverse agonist of the serotonin 5-HT_{7} receptor. The compound is several-fold more potent as a serotonin 5-HT_{7} receptor inverse agonist than its parent compound anhalinine.

== See also ==
- Substituted tetrahydroisoquinoline
- Anhalinine
- Anhalidine
- O-Methylpellotine
- N-Methylmescaline
