= AS-19 (drug) =

Chemical compound

Clinical data
- Drug class: Serotonin 5-HT_{7} receptor agonist

Identifiers
- IUPAC name: (2S)-N,N-dimethyl-5-(1,3,5-trimethylpyrazol-4-yl)-1,2,3,4-tetrahydronaphthalen-2-amine
- CAS Number: 1000578-26-6
- PubChem CID: 23642275
- ChemSpider: 24605931
- UNII: LA5AQ5R6QS
- ChEMBL: ChEMBL2164327

Chemical and physical data
- Formula: C_{18}H_{25}N_{3}
- Molar mass: 283.419 g·mol^{−1}
- 3D model (JSmol): Interactive image
- SMILES: CC1=C(C(=NN1C)C)C2=C3CC[C@@H](CC3=CC=C2)N(C)C
- InChI: InChI=1S/C18H25N3/c1-12-18(13(2)21(5)19-12)17-8-6-7-14-11-15(20(3)4)9-10-16(14)17/h6-8,15H,9-11H2,1-5H3/t15-/m0/s1; Key:BTTOYOKCLDAHHO-HNNXBMFYSA-N

AS-19 is a substance which acts as a potent agonist at the 5-HT_{7} receptor, with an IC_{50} of 0.83 nM. It reverses the amnesia induced by drugs such as scopolamine and dizocilpine and improves long-term memory acquisition, but inhibits short-term memory formation.

== See also ==
- Substituted 2-aminotetralin
- E-55888
- LP-12
- LP-44
- LP-211
