= SB-258719 =

Drug

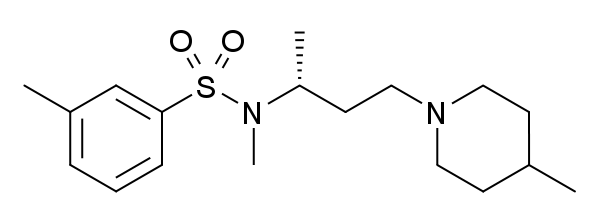

Identifiers
- IUPAC name: (1R)-3,N-dimethyl-N-[1-methyl-3-(4-methylpiperidin-1-yl)propyl]benzenesulfonamide
- CAS Number: 195199-95-2
- PubChem CID: 5312148
- IUPHAR/BPS: 281
- ChemSpider: 4471578
- UNII: GF43CP5LXQ
- ChEMBL: ChEMBL12264
- CompTox Dashboard (EPA): DTXSID201029788

Chemical and physical data
- Formula: C_{18}H_{30}N_{2}O_{2}S
- Molar mass: 338.51 g·mol^{−1}
- 3D model (JSmol): Interactive image
- SMILES: c1ccc(C)cc1S(=O)(=O)N(C)C(C)CCN(CC2)CCC2C
- InChI: InChI=1S/C18H30N2O2S/c1-15-8-11-20(12-9-15)13-10-17(3)19(4)23(21,22)18-7-5-6-16(2)14-18/h5-7,14-15,17H,8-13H2,1-4H3/t17-/m1/s1; Key:AGVNHDNTFYHZNL-QGZVFWFLSA-N

SB-258719 is a drug developed by GlaxoSmithKline which acts as a selective 5-HT_{7} receptor partial inverse agonist, and was the first such ligand identified for 5-HT_{7}. Its use in research has mainly been in demonstrating the potential use for 5-HT_{7} agonists as potential novel analgesics, due to the ability of SB-258719 to block the analgesic effects of a variety of 5-HT_{7} agonists across several different testing models.
