= SB-269970 =

Chemical compound

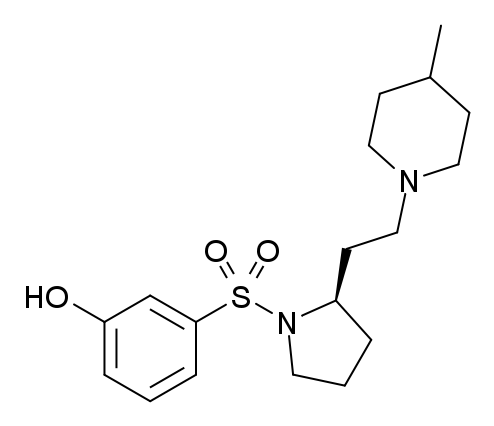

Identifiers
- IUPAC name: (2R)-1-[(3-Hydroxyphenyl)sulfonyl]-2 -(2-(4-methyl-1-piperidinyl)ethyl)pyrrolidine
- CAS Number: 201038-74-6
- PubChem CID: 6604889
- IUPHAR/BPS: 3233
- ChemSpider: 5037148
- UNII: KC8KP5XU6F
- ChEBI: CHEBI:92426
- ChEMBL: ChEMBL282199
- CompTox Dashboard (EPA): DTXSID90942127

Chemical and physical data
- Formula: C_{18}H_{28}N_{2}O_{3}S
- Molar mass: 352.49 g·mol^{−1}
- 3D model (JSmol): Interactive image
- SMILES: CC2CCN(CC2)CCC1CCCN1S(=O)(=O)c(c3)cccc3O
- InChI: InChI=1S/C18H28N2O3S/c1-15-7-11-19(12-8-15)13-9-16-4-3-10-20(16)24(22,23)18-6-2-5-17(21)14-18/h2,5-6,14-16,21H,3-4,7-13H2,1H3/t16-/m1/s1; Key:HWKROQUZSKPIKQ-MRXNPFEDSA-N

SB-269970 is a drug and research chemical developed by GlaxoSmithKline used in scientific studies. It is believed to act as a selective 5-HT_{7} receptor antagonist (EC_{50} = 1.25 nM) (or possibly inverse agonist). A subsequent study in guinea pig at a concentration of 10 μM showed that it also blocks the α_{2}-adrenergic receptor. The large difference in test concentrations however confirms the selectivity of SB-269970 for the 5-HT_{7} receptor.

SB-269970 is used to study the 5-HT_{7} receptors which are thought to be involved in the function of several areas of the brain such as the hippocampus and thalamus, and regulation of dopamine release in the ventral tegmental area. Possible therapeutic uses for SB-269970 and other 5-HT_{7} antagonists include the treatment of anxiety and depression, and nootropic effects have also been noted in animal studies.
