= 5-HT7 receptor =

Protein-coding gene in the species Homo sapiens

HTR7

Identifiers
- Aliases: HTR7, 5-HT7, 5-HT7 receptor, 5-hydroxytryptamine receptor 7
- External IDs: OMIM: 182137; MGI: 99841; GeneCards: HTR7

Gene location (Human)
Chr.	Chromosome 10 (human)
Band	10q23.31	Start	90,740,823 bp
Band	10q23.31	End	90,858,039 bp

Gene location (Mouse)
Chr.	Chromosome 19 (mouse)
Band	19 C2|19 30.3 cM	Start	35,936,134 bp
Band	19 C2|19 30.3 cM	End	36,034,907 bp
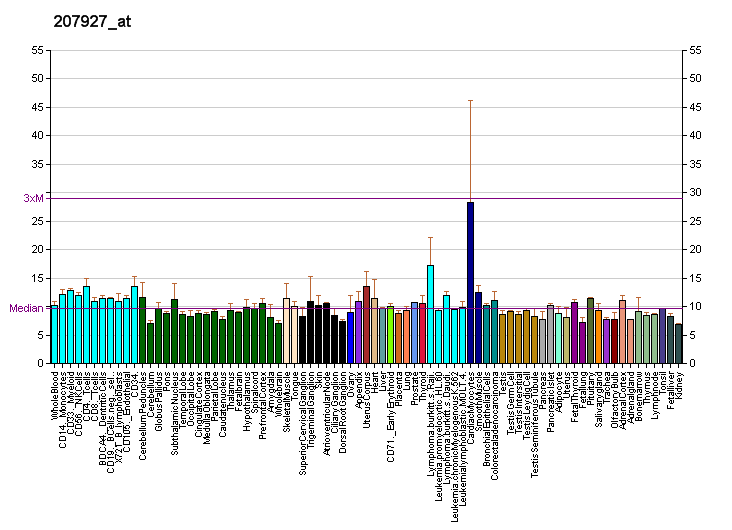

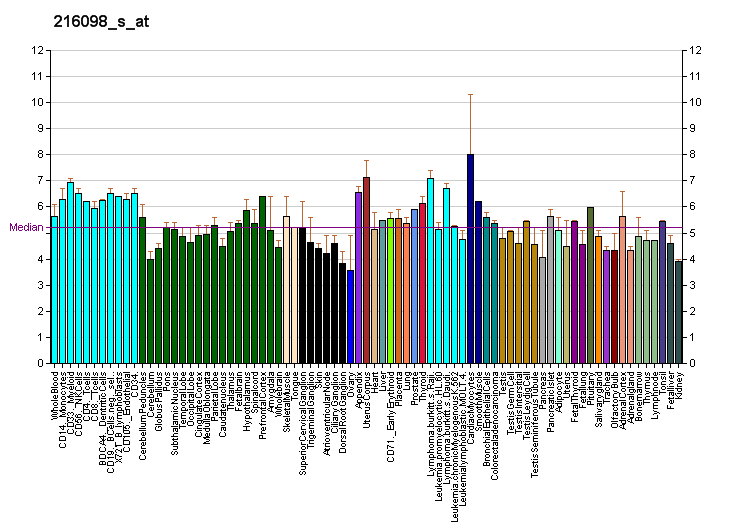

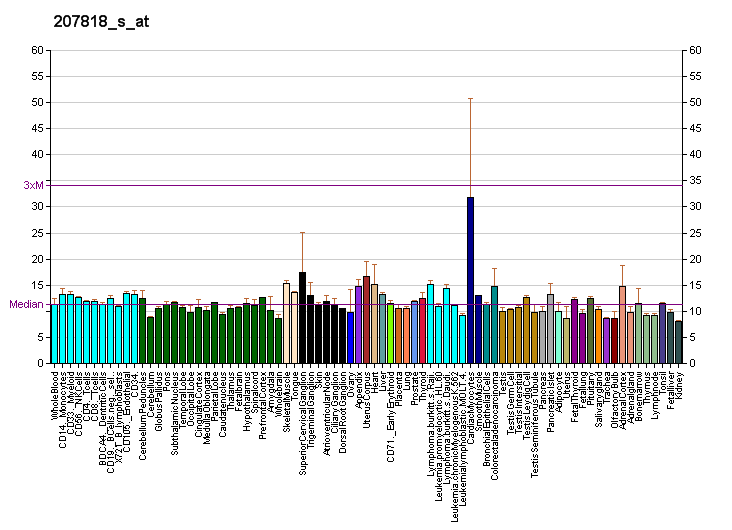
RNA expression pattern
Bgee	Human / Mouse (ortholog); Top expressed in: testicle; gonad; sperm; secondary oocyte; left testis; lateral nuclear group of thalamus; right testis; gastric mucosa; Descending thoracic aorta; stromal cell of endometrium / Top expressed in: medial dorsal nucleus; lateral septal nucleus; ventromedial nucleus; medial geniculate nucleus; mammillary body; paraventricular nucleus of hypothalamus; utricle; lateral geniculate nucleus; dorsomedial hypothalamic nucleus; lateral hypothalamus; More reference expression data
BioGPS	More reference expression data
Gene ontology
Molecular function	G protein-coupled receptor activity; signal transducer activity; neurotransmitter receptor activity; G protein-coupled serotonin receptor activity; serotonin binding; protein binding
Cellular component	integral component of membrane; plasma membrane; integral component of plasma membrane; membrane; dendrite
Biological process	smooth muscle contraction; G protein-coupled receptor signaling pathway, coupled to cyclic nucleotide second messenger; circadian rhythm; blood circulation; vasoconstriction; signal transduction; chemical synaptic transmission; adenylate cyclase-inhibiting serotonin receptor signaling pathway; G protein-coupled receptor signaling pathway; G protein-coupled serotonin receptor signaling pathway
Sources:Amigo / QuickGO
Orthologs
Databases	NCBI: entry; OMA: entry
Species	Human	Mouse
Entrez	3363	15566
Ensembl	ENSG00000148680	ENSMUSG00000024798
UniProt	P34969	P32304
RefSeq (mRNA)	NM_019860; NM_000872; NM_019859	NM_008315; NM_001347442; NM_001360297; NM_001360298; NM_001360300 NM_001360318
RefSeq (protein)	NP_000863; NP_062873; NP_062874	NP_001334371; NP_032341; NP_001347226; NP_001347227; NP_001347229 NP_001347247
Location (UCSC)	Chr 10: 90.74 – 90.86 Mb	Chr 19: 35.94 – 36.03 Mb
PubMed search
- Wikidata
View/Edit Human	View/Edit Mouse

The 5-HT_{7} receptor is a member of the GPCR superfamily of cell surface receptors and is activated by the neurotransmitter serotonin (5-hydroxytryptamine, 5-HT). The 5-HT_{7} receptor is coupled to G_{s} (stimulates the production of the intracellular signaling molecule cAMP) and is expressed in a variety of human tissues, particularly in the brain, the gastrointestinal tract, and in various blood vessels. This receptor has been a drug development target for the treatment of several clinical disorders. The 5-HT_{7} receptor is encoded by the HTR7 gene, which in humans is transcribed into 3 different splice variants.

== Function ==
When the 5-HT_{7} receptor is activated by serotonin, it sets off a cascade of events starting with release of the stimulatory G protein G_{s} from the GPCR complex. G_{s} in turn activates adenylate cyclase which increases intracellular levels of the second messenger cAMP.

The 5-HT_{7} receptor plays a role in smooth muscle relaxation within the vasculature and in the gastrointestinal tract. The highest 5-HT_{7} receptor densities are in the thalamus and hypothalamus, and it is present at higher densities also in the hippocampus and cortex. The 5-HT_{7} receptor is involved in thermoregulation, circadian rhythm, learning and memory, and sleep. Peripheral 5-HT_{7} receptors are localized in enteric nerves; high levels of 5-HT_{7} receptor-expressing mucosal nerve fibers were observed in the colon of patients with irritable bowel syndrome. An essential role of 5-HT_{7} receptor in intestinal hyperalgesia was demonstrated in mouse models with visceral hypersensitivity, of which a novel 5-HT_{7} receptor antagonist administered perorally reduced intestinal pain levels. It is also speculated that this receptor may be involved in mood regulation, suggesting that it may be a useful target in the treatment of depression. The receptor's involvement in neuroplasticity and mitigating neuroinflammation also highlights potential therapeutic targets for neuropsychiatric disorders and neurological impairment.

== Variants ==
Three splice variants have been identified in humans (designated h5-HT_{7(a)}, h5-HT_{7(b)}, and h5-HT_{7(d)}), which encode receptors that differ in their carboxy terminals. The h5-HT_{7(a)} is the full length receptor (445 amino acids), while the h5-HT_{7(b)} is truncated at amino acid 432 due to alternative splice donor site. The h5-HT_{7(d)} is a distinct isoform of the receptor: the retention of an exon cassette in the region encoding the carboxyl terminal results a 479-amino acid receptor with a c-terminus markedly different from the h5-HT_{7(a)}. A 5-HT_{7(c)} splice variant is detectable in rat tissue but is not expressed in humans. Conversely, rats do not express a splice variant homologous to the h5-HT_{7(d)}, as the rat 5-HT_{7} gene lacks the exon necessary to encode this isoform. Drug binding affinities are similar across the three human splice variants; however, inverse agonist efficacies appear to differ between the splice variants.

== Discovery ==
In 1983, evidence for a 5-HT_{1}-like receptor was first found. Ten years later, 5-HT_{7} receptor was cloned and characterized. It has since become clear that the receptor described in 1983 is 5-HT_{7}.

== Ligands ==
Numerous orthosteric ligands of moderate to high affinity are known. Functionally selective ligands have been discovered and developed.

=== Agonists ===
Agonists mimic the effects of the endogenous ligand, which is serotonin at the 5-HT_{7} receptor (↑cAMP).

- 5-Carboxamidotryptamine (5-CT)
- 5-methoxytryptamine (5-MT, 5-MeOT)
- 8-OH-DPAT (mixed 5-HT_{1A}/5-HT_{7} agonist)
- Aripiprazole (weak partial agonist)
- AS-19
- E-55888
- E-57431
- LP-12 (4-(2-Diphenyl)-N-(1,2,3,4-tetrahydronaphthalen-1-yl)-1-piperazinehexanamide)
- LP-44 (4-[2-(Methylthio)phenyl]-N-(1,2,3,4-tetrahydro-1-naphthalenyl)-1-piperazinehexanamide)
- LP-211
- MSD-5a
- N_{ω}-Methylserotonin
- N-(1,2,3,4-Tetrahydronaphthalen-1-yl)-4-aryl-1-piperazinehexanamides (can function as either an agonist or antagonist depending on side chain substitution)
- Dimethyltryptamine (DMT)
- AGH-107 (water-soluble, brain penetrating full agonist)
- AH-494 (3-(1-ethyl-1H-imidazol-5-yl)-1H-indole-5-carboxamide)
- AGH-192 (orally bioavailable, water-soluble, brain penetrating full agonist)

=== Antagonists ===
Neutral antagonists (also known as silent antagonists) bind the receptor and have no intrinsic activity but will block the activity of agonists or inverse agonists. Inverse agonists inhibit the constitutive activity of the receptor, producing functional effects opposite to those of agonists (at the 5-HT_{7} receptor: ↓cAMP). Neutral antagonists and inverse agonists are typically referred to collectively as "antagonists" and, in the case of the 5-HT_{7} receptor, differentiation between neutral antagonists and inverse agonists is problematic due to differing levels of inverse agonist efficacy between receptor splice variants. For instance, mesulergine and metergoline are reported to be neutral antagonists at the h5-HT_{7(a)} and h5-HT_{7(d)} receptor isoforms but these drugs display marked inverse agonist effects at the h5-HT_{7(b)} splice variant.

- 3-{4-[4-(4-chlorophenyl)-piperazin-1-yl]-butyl}-3-ethyl-6-fluoro-1,3-dihydro-2H-indol-2-one
- Amisulpride
- Amitriptyline
- Amoxapine
- Brexpiprazole
- Clomipramine
- Clozapine
- CYY1005 (a highly selective, orally active 5-HT7 antagonist)
- DR-4004
- DR-4485
- DSP-6745
- EGIS-12233 (mixed 5-HT_{6}/5-HT_{7} antagonist)
- AVN-101 (mixed 5-HT_{6}/5-HT_{7} antagonist)
- Fluphenazine
- Fluperlapine
- ICI 169,369
- Imipramine
- JNJ-18038683
- Ketanserin
- Loxapine
- Lurasidone
- LY-215,840
- Maprotiline
- Mesulergine
- Metitepine
- Methysergide
- Mianserin
- Nuciferine
- Olanzapine
- Pimozide
- Pirepemat
- RA-7 (1-(2-diphenyl)piperazine)
- Ritanserin
- SB-258,719
- SB-258741
- SB-269970 (highly 5-HT_{7} selective)
- SB-656104-A
- SB-691673
- Sertindole
- Spiperone
- Tenilapine
- TFMPP
- Vortioxetine
- Trifluoperazine
- Ziprasidone
- Zotepine

Tetrahydroisoquinoline alkaloids found in peyote and related to mescaline have been found to act as potent inverse agonists of the serotonin 5-HT_{7} receptor. These compounds include pellotine, anhalidine, anhalonidine, anhalamine, and N-methylanhalinine.

==== Inactivating antagonists ====
Inactivating antagonists are non-competitive antagonists that render the receptor persistently insensitive to agonist, which resembles receptor desensitization. Inactivation of the 5-HT_{7} receptor, however, does not arise from the classically described mechanisms of receptor desensitization via receptor phosphorylation, beta-arrestin recruitment, and receptor internalization. Inactivating antagonists all likely interact with the 5-HT_{7} receptor in an irreversible/pseudo-irreversible manner, as is the case with [^{3}H]risperidone.

- Bromocriptine
- Lisuride
- Metergoline
- Methiothepin
- Paliperidone
- Risperidone

== See also ==
- 5-HT receptor
- 5-HT_{1} receptor
- 5-HT_{2} receptor
- 5-HT_{3} receptor
- 5-HT_{4} receptor
- 5-HT_{5} receptor
- 5-HT_{6} receptor
