= Neuropsychopharmacology (journal) =

Peer-reviewed scientific journal

- Discipline: Neuropsychopharmacology
- Language: English
- Edited by: Tony P. George, Lisa M. Monteggia

Publication details
- History: 1987-present
- Publisher: Nature Portfolio
- Frequency: Monthly
- Open access: Hybrid; delayed, after 6 months
- Impact factor: 7.1 (2024)

Standard abbreviations
- ISO 4: Neuropsychopharmacology

Indexing
- CODEN: NEROEW
- ISSN: 0893-133X (print); 1740-634X (web)
- OCLC no.: 815994337

Links
- Journal homepage; Online access; Online archive

Neuropsychopharmacology is a monthly peer-reviewed scientific journal published by Nature Portfolio. It was established in 1987 and is an official publication of the American College of Neuropsychopharmacology. The journal covers all aspects of neuropsychopharmacology, including clinical and basic science research into the brain and behavior, the properties of agents acting within the central nervous system, and drug targeting and development. In addition to primary articles and reviews, the journal publishes Brainpod, a podcast highlighting content published in the journal and featuring interviews with the authorship team.

== Editors-in-chief ==
Over the years, there have been ten editors-in-chief ("principal editors"), including J. Christian Gillin (1987-1993), Ronald D. Ciaranello (1994), Herbert Y. Meltzer (1994-1998), Hans C. Fibiger (1995-1998), Robert H. Lenox (1999-2001), Charles B. Nemeroff (2002-2006), and James H. Meador-Woodruff (2007-2012) and William A. Carlezon, Jr. (2013-2022). Since 2023, Tony P. George (University of Toronto) and Lisa M. Monteggia (Vanderbilt University) have been co-editors.

== Abstracting and indexing ==
The journal is abstracted and indexed in:

- Biological Abstracts
- BIOSIS Previews
- CAB Abstracts
- Chemical Abstracts Service
- Current Contents/Life Sciences
- EBSCO databases
- Embase
- Index Medicus/MEDLINE/PubMed
- PASCAL
- PsycINFO
- Science Citation Index Expanded
- Scopus

According to the Journal Citation Reports, the journal has a 2024 impact factor of 7.1.
