= Eric J. Nestler =

Neuroscientist of addiction and depression

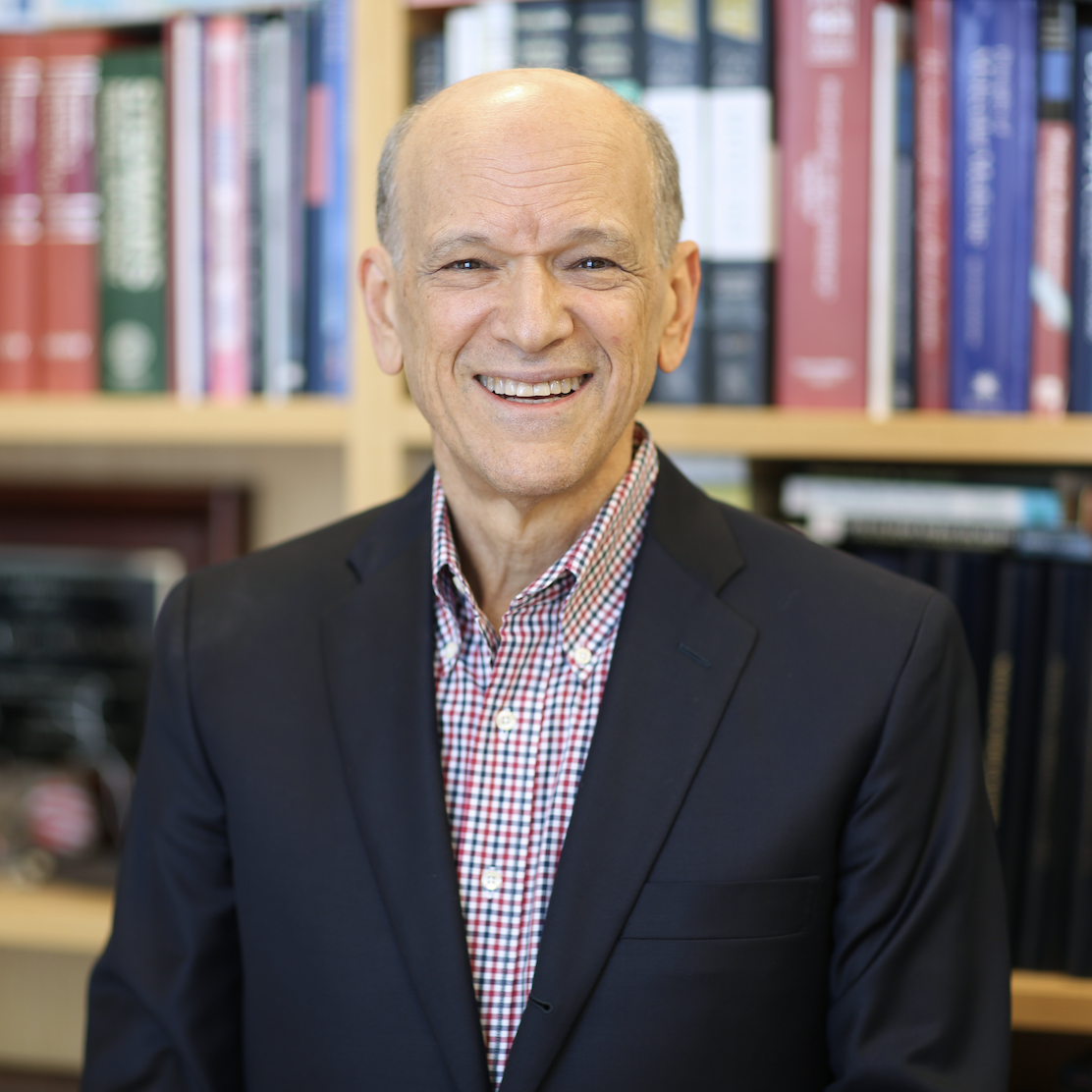
- Born: July 8, 1954 (age 72); New York, NY
- Occupation: Neuroscientist
- Title: Anne and Joel Ehrenkranz Dean, Icahn School of Medicine at Mount Sinai; Executive Vice President and Chief Scientific Officer, Mount Sinai Health System

Academic background
- Education: Yale University (B.A., Ph.D., M.D.)
- Doctoral advisor: Paul Greengard

Academic work
- Discipline: Neuroscience; Psychiatry
- Institutions: Yale University; University of Texas Southwestern Medical Center; Icahn School of Medicine at Mount Sinai
- Website: labs.neuroscience.mssm.edu/project/nestler-lab/

Eric J. Nestler (born July 8, 1954) is an American neuroscientist and academic psychiatrist whose work focuses on the molecular and cellular mechanisms underlying drug addiction, depression, and stress-related psychiatric disorders. He is the Anne and Joel Ehrenkranz Dean of the Icahn School of Medicine at Mount Sinai and Chief Scientific Officer the Mount Sinai Health System. He was formerly the Nash Family Professor of Neuroscience and a founding director of The Friedman Brain Institute at Mount Sinai. Previously, he served as founding director of the Division of Molecular Psychiatry at Yale University and Chair of the Department of Psychiatry at the University of Texas Southwestern Medical Center at Dallas.

Nestler is known for elucidating how transcriptional and epigenetic mechanisms—including the transcription factor ΔFosB—produce long-lasting changes in brain reward and stress circuits that contribute to addiction, depression, and stress resilience. He has authored or co-authored several widely used textbooks in psychiatry and neuroscience and more than 700 peer-reviewed articles. He has served as president of the American College of Neuropsychopharmacology and the Society for Neuroscience, and has been elected to the National Academy of Medicine, the American Academy of Arts and Sciences, and the National Academy of Sciences.

== Biography ==
=== Education ===
Nestler is a graduate of Herricks High School in New Hyde Park, New York. He received his B.A., his Ph.D. and his M.D. from Yale University, where he performed his doctoral research in the laboratory of Paul Greengard. He completed his residency in psychiatry at both McLean Hospital in Massachusetts and Yale in 1987.

=== Career ===
Nestler served as Director of the Abraham Ribicoff Research Facilities, and as the Founding Director of the Division of Molecular Psychiatry, at Yale until 2000, and as Chair of the Department of Psychiatry at the University of Texas Southwestern Medical Center at Dallas. He joined Mount Sinai in 2008 as Chair of Neuroscience (2008-2016) and Founding Director of The Friedman Brain Institute (2008-2025), which he and his colleagues built into one of the foremost neuroscience institutes in the world. In 2016, Nestler was named Dean for Academic and Scientific Affairs and was named Interim Dean in 2025. He has served on the Boards of Scientific Counselors of the National Institute on Drug Abuse and of the National Institute on Alcohol Abuse and Alcoholism, on the National Advisory Mental Health Council for the National Institute of Mental Health, the National Advisory Drug Abuse Council for the National Institute on Drug Abuse, as Council Member of the American College of Neuropsychopharmacology (for which he served as president in 2011) and the Society for Neuroscience (for which he served as president in 2017). He chairs the Depression Task Force of the Hope for Depression Research Foundation, co-chairs the Scientific Advisory Board of One Mind (previously International Mental Health Research Organization), is a scientific council member of the Brain & Behavior Research Foundation (BBRF, previously NARSAD), and a past member of the Board of Directors of the McKnight Endowment Fund in Neuroscience. He was elected to the Institute of Medicine (now National Academy of Medicine) in 1998, the American Academy of Arts and Sciences in 2005, and the National Academy of Sciences in 2025.

=== Research ===
The Nestler laboratory's focus in neuropsychopharmacology and molecular neuroscience concentrates on forming a molecular approach to psychiatry and furthering the understanding of the molecular basis of both depression and drug addiction, using animal models to study the way drug use or stress affects the brain. His addiction research largely centers around several transcription factors, including ΔFosB and CREB (master control proteins that induce addiction or depression in vulnerable individuals or resistance to these syndromes in resilient individuals) and the associated epigenetic remodeling that occurs in specific neuronal or glial cell types in the brain. A major goal is to identify the 'chromatin scars'—long lasting epigenetic changes at specific genomic loci—that mediate lifelong changes in disease vulnerability. Among the prominent targets of this work are medium spiny neurons of the nucleus accumbens and pyramidal neurons in prefrontal cortex and ventral hippocampus.

The Nestler laboratory has driven innovative use of viral-mediated gene transfer, inducible, cell-type specific mutations in mice, and locus-specific epigenome editing to establish causal links between molecular and behavioral phenomena in animal models. The laboratory also makes use of machine learning approaches to derive novel biological insight from large sequencing datasets.

=== Awards ===
Nestler's awards and honors include the Pfizer Scholars Award (1987), the Sloan Research Fellowship (1987), the McKnight Scholar Award (1989), the Jordi-Folch-Pi Memorial Award from the American Society of Neurochemistry (1990), the Efron Award of the American College of Neuropsychopharmacology (1994), the Pasarow Foundation Award for Neuropsychiatric Research (1998), the NARSAD Distinguished Investigator Award (1996), the Bristol-Myers Squibb Freedom to Discover Neuroscience Research Grant (2004), the Patricia S. Goldman-Rakic Award and the Falcone Prize both from NARSAD (2008, 2009), and the Rhoda and Bernard Sarnat International Prize in Mental Health from the Institute of Medicine (2010). He received an honorary doctorate from Uppsala University in Sweden in 2011, and the Anna Monika Prize in Depression Research (2012).

In 2017, he was awarded the Wilbur Cross Medal by Yale University for distinguished alumnus from the graduate school, and the Paul Hoch Distinguished Service Award from the American College of Neuropsychopharmacology. In 2019, he received the Redelsheimer Distinguished Award in Biological Psychiatry from the Society for Biological Psychiatry. In 2020, Nestler received an honorary degree from Concordia University in Montreal as "a pioneer in depression and drug-addiction research and institutional advocacy for equity, diversity and inclusion. He is also the recipient of the Barbara Fish Memorial Award in 2021 for outstanding contributions to the field of neuroscience from the American College of Neuropsychopharmacology and the Peter Seeburg Integrative Neuroscience Prize in 2023 from the Schaller-Nikolich Foundation and Society for Neuroscience. In 2025, he received the Synapsy Prize, University of Geneva, and was elected to the National Academy of Sciences.

== Publications (partial list) ==
=== Books ===
Nestler is the author (with Dennis S. Charney and Joseph D. Buxbaum) of Neurobiology of Mental Illness (6th edition; ISBN 9780197640654), of Nestler, Hyman and Malenka's Molecular Neuropharmacology (with Paul J. Kenny, Scott J. Russo and Anne Schaefer); 4th edition; ISBN 978-1-26045-690-5) and two additional books published earlier: Protein Phosphorylation in the Nervous System (with Paul Greengard; ISBN 978-0-47180-558-8) and Molecular Foundations of Psychiatry (with Steven E. Hyman; ISBN 978-0-88048-353-7). He is also the author of more than 725 peer-reviewed publications and reviews.

=== Articles ===
Nestler has been cited more than 186,953 times and has an H-index of 216.

- Bagot RC, Cates HM, Purushothaman I, Lorsch ZS, Walker DM, Wang J, Huang X, Schlüter OM, Maze I, Peña CJ, Heller EA, Issler O, Wang M, Song WM, Stein JL, Liu X, Doyle MA, Scobie KN, Sun HS, Neve RL, Geschwind D, Dong Y, Shen L, Zhang B, Nestler EJ (2016). "Circuit-wide transcriptional profiling reveals brain region-specific gene networks regulating depression susceptibility". Neuron. 90 (5): 969–83. doi:10.1016/j.neuron.2016.04.015. PMC 4896746. PMID 27181059.
- Berton O, McClung CA, DiLeone RJ, Krishnan V, Russo S, Graham D, Tsankova NM, Bolanos CA, Rios M, Monteggia LM, Self DW, Nestler EJ (2006). "Essential role of BDNF in the mesolimbic dopamine pathway in social defeat stress". Science. 311 (5762): 864–868. Bibcode:2006Sci...311..864B. doi:10.1126/science.1120972. PMID 16469931. S2CID 32965598.
- Browne CJ, Futamura R, Minier-Toribio A, Hicks EM, Ramakrishnan A, Martínez-Rivera FJ, Estill M, Godino A, Parise EM, Torres-Berrío A, Cunningham AM, Hamilton PJ, Walker DM, Huckins LM, Hurd YL, Shen L, Nestler EJ (2023). "Transcriptional signatures of heroin intake and relapse throughout the brain reward circuitry in male mice". Sci Adv. 9 (23) eadg8558. Bibcode:2023SciA....9G8558B. doi:10.1126/sciadv.adg8558. PMC 10256172. PMID 37294757.
- Cahill ME, Bagot RC, Gancarz AM, Walker DM, Sun H, Wang ZJ, Heller EA, Feng J, Kennedy PJ, Koo JW, Cates HM, Neve RL, Shen L, Dietz DM, Nestler EJ (2016). "Bidirectional Synaptic Structural Plasticity after Chronic Cocaine Administration Occurs through Rap1 Small GTPase Signaling". Neuron. 89 (3): 566–582. doi:10.1016/j.neuron.2016.01.031. PMC 4743039. PMID 26844834.
- Carlezon WA, Boundy VA, Haile CN, Kalb RG, Neve R, Nestler EJ (1997). "Sensitization to morphine induced by viral-mediated gene transfer". Science. 277 (5327): 812–814. doi:10.1126/science.277.5327.812. PMID 9242609.
- Carlezon WA, Thome J, Olson VG, Lane-Ladd SB, Brodkin ES, Hiroi N, Duman RS, Neve RL, Nestler EJ (1998). "Regulation of cocaine reward by CREB". Science. 282 (5397): 2272–2275. Bibcode:1998Sci...282.2272C. doi:10.1126/science.282.5397.2272. PMID 9856954.
- Dias C, Feng J, Sun H, Shao NY, Mazei-Robison MS, Damez-Werno D, Scobie K, Bagot R, LaBonté B, Ribeiro E, Liu X, Kennedy P, Vialou V, Ferguson D, Peña C, Calipari ES, Koo JW, Mouzon E, Ghose S, Tamminga C, Neve R, Shen L, Nestler EJ (2014). "β-catenin mediates stress resilience through Dicer1/microRNA regulation". Nature. 516 (7529): 51–55. Bibcode:2014Natur.516...51D. doi:10.1038/nature13976. PMC 4257892. PMID 25383518.
- Feng J, Shao N, Szulwach KE, Vialou V, Huynh J, Zhong C, Le T, Ferguson D, Cahill ME, Li Y, Koo JW, Ribeiro E, Labonte B, Laitman BM, Estey D, Stockman V, Kennedy P, Couroussé T, Mensah I, Turecki G, Faull KF, Ming GL, Song H, Fan G, Casaccia P, Shen L, Jin P, Nestler EJ (2015). "Role of Tet1 and 5-hydroxymethylcytosine in cocaine action". Nat Neurosci. 18 (4): 536–444. doi:10.1038/nn.3976. PMC 4617315. PMID 25774451.
- Godino A, Salery M, Durand-de Cuttoli R, Estill MS, Holt LM, Futamura R, Browne CJ, Mews P, Hamilton PJ, Neve RL, Shen L, Russo SJ, Nestler EJ (2023). "Transcriptional control of nucleus accumbens neuronal excitability by retinoid X receptor alpha tunes sensitivity to drug rewards". Neuron. 111 (9): 1453–1467. doi:10.1016/j.neuron.2023.02.013. PMC 10164098. PMID 36889314.
- Godino A, Salery M, Minier-Toribio AM, Patel V, Fullard JF, Kondev V, Parise EM, Martinez-Rivera FJ, Morel C, Roussos P, Blitzer RD, Nestler EJ (2025). "Dopamine D1-D2 signalling in hippocampus arbitrates approach and avoidance". Nature. 643 (8071): 448–457. doi:10.1038/s41586-025-08957-5. PMC 10402022. PMID 40335693.
- Heller EA, Cates HM, Peña CJ, Sun H, Shao N, Feng J, Golden SA, Herman JP, Walsh JJ, Mazei-Robison M, Ferguson D, Knight S, Gerber MA, Nievera C, Han MH, Russo SJ, Tamminga CS, Neve RL, Shen L, Zhang HS, Zhang F, Nestler EJ (2014). "Locus-specific epigenetic remodeling controls addiction- and depression-related behaviors". Nat Neurosci. 17 (12): 1720–1727. doi:10.1038/nn.3871. PMC 4241193. PMID 25347353.
- Issler O, van der Zee YY, Ramakrishnan A, Wang J, Tan C, Loh YE, Purushothaman I, Walker DM, Lorsch ZS, Hamilton PJ, Peña CJ, Flaherty E, Hartley BJ, Torres-Berrío A, Parise EM, Kronman H, Duffy JE, Estill MS, Calipari ES, Labonté B, Neve RL, Tamminga CA, Brennand KJ, Dong Y, Shen L, Nestler EJ (2020). "Sex-Specific Role for the Long Non-coding RNA LINC00473 in Depression". Neuron. 106 (6): 912–926.e5. doi:10.1016/j.neuron.2020.03.023. PMC 7305959. PMID 32304628.
- Issler O, van der Zee YY, Ramakrishnan A, Xia S, Zinsmaier AK, Tan C, Li W, Browne CJ, Walker DM, Salery M, Torres-Berrío A, Futamura R, Duffy JE, Labonte B, Girgenti MJ, Tamminga CA, Dupree JL, Dong Y, Murrough JW, Shen L, Nestler EJ (2022). "The long noncoding RNA FEDORA is a cell type- and sex-specific regulator of depression". Sci Adv. 8 (48) eabn9494. Bibcode:2022SciA....8N9494I. doi:10.1126/sciadv.abn9494. PMC 9710883. PMID 36449610.
- Kelz MB, Chen JS, Carlezon WA, Whisler K, Gilden L, Beckmann AM, Steffen C, Zhang YJ, Marotti L, Self DW, Tkatch R, Baranauskas G, Surmeier DJ, Neve RL, Duman RS, Picciotto MR, Nestler EJ (1999). "Expression of the transcription factor ∆FosB in the brain controls sensitivity to cocaine". Nature. 401 (6750): 272–276. doi:10.1038/45790. PMID 10499584. S2CID 4390717.
- Koo JW, Mazei-Robison MS, Chaudhury D, Juarez B, LaPlant Q, Ferguson D, Feng J, Sun HS, Scobie K, Damez-Werno D, Crumiller M, Ohnishi YN, Ohnishi YH, Mouzon E, Dietz DM, Lobo KM, Neve RL, Russo SJ, Han MH, Nestler EJ (2012). "Novel role of BDNF as a negative modulator of morphine action". Science. 338 (6103): 124–128. doi:10.1126/science.1222265. PMC 3547365. PMID 23042896.
- Koo JW, Mazei-Robison MS, LaPlant Q, Egervari G, Braunscheidel KM, Adank DN, Ferguson D, Feng J, Sun H, Scobie KN, Damez-Werno DM, Ribeiro E, Peña CJ, Walker D, Bagot RC, Cahill ME, Anderson SA, Labonté B, Hodes GE, Browne H, Chadwick B, Robison AJ, Vialou VF, Dias C, Lorsch Z, Mouzon E, Lobo MK, Dietz DM, Russo SJ, Neve RL, Hurd YL, Nestler EJ (2015). "Epigenetic basis of opiate suppression of Bdnf gene expression in the ventral tegmental area". Nat Neurosci. 18 (3): 415–422. doi:10.1038/nn.3932. PMC 4340719. PMID 25643298.
- Krishnan V, Han MH, Graham DL, Berton O, Renthal W, Russo SJ, LaPlant Q, Graham A, Lutter M, Lagace DC, Ghose S, Reister R, Tannous P, Green TA, Neve RL, Chakravarty S, Kumar A, Eisch AJ, Self DW, Lee FS, Tamminga CA, Cooper DC, Gershenfeld HK, Nestler EJ (2007). "Susceptibility and resistance to social defeat are mediated through molecular adaptations in brain reward regions". Cell. 131 (2): 391–404. doi:10.1016/j.cell.2007.09.018. PMID 17956738.
- Kronman H, Torres-Berrío A, Sidoli S, Issler O, Godino A, Ramakrishnan A, Mews P, Lardner CK, Parise EM, Walker DM, van der Zee YY, Browne CJ, Boyce BF, Neve R, Garcia BA, Shen L, Peña CJ, Nestler EJ (2021). "Long-term behavioral and cell-type-specific molecular effects of early life stress are mediated by H3K79me2 dynamics in medium spiny neurons". Nat Neurosci. 24 (5): 667–676. doi:10.1038/s41593-021-00814-8. PMC 8216773. PMID 33723435.
- Kumar A, Choi KH, Renthal W, Tsankova NM, Theobald DE, Truong HT, Russo SJ, Laplant Q, Sasaki TS, Whistler KN, Neve RL, Self DW, Nestler EJ (2005). "Chromatin remodeling is a key mechanism underlying cocaine-induced plasticity in striatum". Neuron. 48 (2): 303–314. doi:10.1016/j.neuron.2005.09.023. PMID 16242410.
- Labonté B, Engmann O, Purushothaman I, Menard C, Wang J, Tan C, Scarpa JR, Moy G, Loh YE, Cahill M, Lorsch ZS, Hamilton PJ, Calipari ES, Hodes GE, Issler O, Kronman H, Pfau M, Obradovic AL, Dong Y, Neve RL, Russo S, Kazarskis A, Tamminga C, Mechawar N, Turecki G, Zhang B, Shen L, Nestler EJ (2017). "Sex-specific transcriptional signatures in human depression". Nat Med. 23 (9): 1102–1111. doi:10.1038/nm.4386. PMC 5734943. PMID 28825715.
- Lobo MK, Covington HE, Chaudhury D, Friedman AK, Sun HS, Damez-Werno D, Dietz D, Zaman S, Koo JW, Kennedy PJ, Mouzon E, Mogri M, Neve RL, Deisseroth K, Han MH, Nestler EJ (2010). "Cell type specific loss of BDNF signaling mimics optogenetic control of cocaine reward". Science. 330 (6002): 385–390. Bibcode:2010Sci...330..385L. doi:10.1126/science.1188472. PMC 3011229. PMID 20947769.
- Lorsch ZS, Hamilton PJ, Ramakrishnan A, Parise EM, Salery M, Wright WJ, Lepack AE, Mews P, Issler O, McKenzie A, Zhou X, Parise LF, Pirpinias ST, Ortiz Torres I, Kronman HG, Montgomery SE, Loh YE, Labonté B, Conkey A, Symonds AE, Neve RL, Turecki G, Maze I, Dong Y, Zhang B, Shen L, Bagot RC, Nestler EJ (2019). "Stress resilience is promoted by a Zfp189-driven transcriptional network in prefrontal cortex". Nat Neurosci. 22 (9): 1413–1423. doi:10.1038/s41593-019-0462-8. PMC 6713580. PMID 31427770.
- Maze I, Covington HE, Dietz DM, LaPlant Q, Renthal W, Russo SJ, Mechanic M, Mouzon E, Neve RL, Haggarty SJ, Ren YH, Sampath SC, Hurd YL, Greengard P, Tarakovsky A, Schaefer A, Nestler EJ (2010). "Essential role of the histone methyltransferase G9a in cocaine-induced plasticity". Science. 327 (5962): 213–216. Bibcode:2010Sci...327..213M. doi:10.1126/science.1179438. PMC 2820240. PMID 20056891.
- Maze I, Shen L, Zhang B, Garcia BA, Shao N, Mitchell A, Sun H, Akbarian S, Allis CD, Nestler EJ (2014). "Analytical tools and current challenges in the modern era of neuroepigenomics". Nat Neurosci. 17 (11): 1476–1490. doi:10.1038/nn.3816. PMC 4262187. PMID 25349914.
- McClung CA, Nestler EJ (2003). "Regulation of gene expression and cocaine reward by CREB and ∆FosB". Nature Neuroscience. 6 (11): 1208–1215. doi:10.1038/nn1143. PMID 14566342. S2CID 38115726.
- Mews P, Cunningham AM, Scarpa J, Ramakrishnan A, Hicks EM, Bolnick S, Garamszegi S, Shen L, Mash DC, Nestler EJ (2023). "Transcriptional control of nucleus accumbens neuronal excitability by retinoid X receptor alpha tunes sensitivity to drug rewards". Sci Adv. 9 (6) eadd8946. doi:10.1126/sciadv.add8946. PMC 9916993. PMID 36763659.
- Mews P, Sosnick L, Gurung A, Sidoli S, Nestler EJ (2024). "Decoding cocaine-induced proteomic adaptations in the mouse nucleus accumbens". Sci Signal. 17 (832) eadl4738. doi:10.1126/scisignal.adl4738. PMC 11170322. PMID 38626009.
- Mews P, Van der Zee Y, Gurung A, Estill M, Futamura R, Kronman H, Ramakrishnan A, Ryan M, Reyes AA, Garcia BA, Browne CJ, Sidoli S, Shen L, Nestler EJ (2024). "Cell type-specific epigenetic priming of gene expression in nucleus accumbens by cocaine". Sci Adv. 10 (40) eado3514. doi:10.1126/sciadv.ado3514. PMC 11451531. PMID 39365860.
- Nectow AR, Nestler EJ (2020). "Viral tools for neuroscience". Nature Reviews Neuroscience. 21 (12): 669–681. doi:10.1038/s41583-020-00382-z. PMC 7808553. PMID 33110222.
- Nestler EJ, Aghajanian GK (1997). "Molecular and cellular basis of addiction". Science. 278 (5335): 58–63. doi:10.1126/science.278.5335.58. PMID 9311927.
- Nestler EJ, Russo SJ (2024). "Neurobiological basis of stress resilience". Neuron. 112 (12): 1911–1929. doi:10.1016/j.neuron.2024.05.001. PMC 11189737. PMID 38795707.
- Nestler EJ (2025). "The biology of addiction". Sci Signal. 18 (872) eadq0031. doi:10.1126/scisignal.adq0031. PMID 39903810.
- Nestler EJ (2001). "Molecular basis of long-term plasticity underlying addiction". Nat Rev Neurosci. 2 (2): 119–128. doi:10.1038/35053570. PMID 11252991. S2CID 52849205.
- Peña CJ, Kronman HG, Walker DM, Cates HM, Bagot RC, Purushothaman I, Issler O, Loh YE, Leong T, Kiraly DD, Goodman E, Neve RL, Shen L, Nestler EJ (2017). "Early life stress confers lifelong stress susceptibility in mice via ventral tegmental area OTX2". Science. 356 (6343): 1185–1188. doi:10.1126/science.aan4491. PMC 5539403. PMID 28619944.
- Renthal W, Kumar A, Xiao GH, Wilkinson M, Convington HE, Mze I, Sikder D, Robison AJ, LaPlant Q, Dietz DM, Russo SJ, Vialou V, Chakravarty S, Kodadek TJ, Stack A, Kabbaj M, Nestler EJ (2009). "Genome wide analysis of chromatin regulation by cocaine reveals a novel role for sirtuins". Neuron. 62 (3): 335–348. doi:10.1016/j.neuron.2009.03.026. PMC 2779727. PMID 19447090.
- Robison AJ, Nestler EJ (2011). "Transcriptional and epigenetic mechanisms of addiction". Nat. Rev. Neurosci. 12 (11): 623–637. doi:10.1038/nrn3111. PMC 3272277. PMID 21989194.
- Russo SJ, Bolanos CA, Theobald DE, DeCarolis NA, Renthal WR, Kumar A, Winstanley CA, Renthal NE, Wiley MD, Self DW, Russell DS, Neve RL, Eisch AJ, Nestler EJ (2007). "The IRS2-Akt pathway in midbrain dopaminergic neurons regulates behavioral and cellular responses to opiates". Nature Neuroscience. 10 (1): 93–99. doi:10.1038/nn1812. PMID 17143271. S2CID 2887841.
- Sabatakos G, Sims NA, Chen J, Aoki K, Kelz MB, Amling M, Bouali Y, Mukhopadhyay K, Ford K, Nestler EJ, Baron R (2000). "Overexpression of DeltaFosB transcription factor(s) increases bone formation and inhibits adipogenesis". Nature Medicine. 6 (9): 985–990. doi:10.1038/79683. PMID 10973317. S2CID 20302360.
- Salery M, Godino A, Xu YQ, Fullard JF, Durand-de Cuttoli R, LaBanca AR, Holt LM, Russo SJ, Roussos P, Nestler EJ (2025). "Cocaine-context memories are transcriptionally encoded in nucleus accumbens Arc ensembles". Nat Commun. 16 (1) 6084. doi:10.1038/s41467-025-61004-9. PMC 12222677. PMID 40603300.
- Self DW, Barnhart WJ, Lehman DA, Nestler EJ (1996). "Opposite modulation of cocaine-seeking behavior by D1-like and D2-like dopamine receptor agonists". Science. 271 (5255): 1586–1589. doi:10.1126/science.271.5255.1586. PMID 8599115. S2CID 38774917.
- Sun H, Damez-Werno DM, Scobie KN, Shao NY, Dias C, Rabkin J, Koo JW, Korb E, Bagot RC, Ahn FH, Cahill ME, Labonté B, Mouzon E, Heller EA, Cates H, Golden SA, Gleason K, Russo SJ, Andrews S, Neve R, Kennedy PJ, Maze I, Dietz DM, Allis CD, Turecki G, Varga-Weisz P, Tamminga C, Shen L, Nestler EJ (2015). "ACF Chromatin-Remodeling Complex Mediates Stress-Induced Depressive-Like Behavior". Nat Med. 21 (10): 1146–1153. doi:10.1038/nm.3939. PMC 4598281. PMID 26390241.
- Tan B, Browne CJ, Nöbauer T, Vaziri A, Friedman JM, Nestler EJ (2024). "Drugs of abuse hijack a mesolimbic pathway that processes homeostatic need". Science. 384 (6693) eadk6742. doi:10.1126/science.adk6742. PMC 11077477. PMID 38669575.
- Tsankova NM, Berton O, Renthal W, Kumar A, Neve RL, Nestler EJ (2006). "Sustained hippocampal chromatin regulation in hippocampus in a mouse model of depression and antidepressant action". Nature Neuroscience. 9 (4): 519–525. doi:10.1038/nn1659. PMID 16501568. S2CID 21547891.
- Vialou V, Robison AJ, LaPlant QC, Covington HE, Dietz DM, Ohnishi YN, Mouzon E, Rush AJ, Watts EL, Wallace DL, Iñiguez SD, Ohnishi YH, Steiner MA, Warren B, Krishnan V, Neve RL, Ghose S, Berton O, Tamminga CA, Nestler EJ (2010). "∆FosB in brain reward circuits mediates resilience to stress and antidepressant responses". Nature Neuroscience. 13 (6): 745–752. doi:10.1038/nn.2551. PMC 2895556. PMID 20473292.
- Yim, YY, et al. (2020). "In vivo locus-specific editing of the neuroepigenome". Nature Reviews Neuroscience. 21 (9): 471–484. doi:10.1038/s41583-020-0334-y. PMC 7439525. PMID 32704051.
