= International Clinical Psychopharmacology =

- Discipline: Neuropsychopharmacology
- Language: English
- Edited by: Alessandro Serretti

Publication details
- History: 1986–present
- Publisher: Wolters Kluwer Health
- Frequency: Bimonthly
- Open access: Hybrid
- Impact factor: 2.023 (2021)

Standard abbreviations
- ISO 4: Int. Clin. Psychopharmacol.

Indexing
- CODEN: ICLPE4
- ISSN: 0268-1315 (print); 1473-5857 (web)
- OCLC no.: 14076534

Links
- Journal homepage; Online access; Online archive

International Clinical Psychopharmacology is a bimonthly peer-reviewed medical journal published by Wolters Kluwer Health. It covers neuropsychopharmacology and clinical psychiatry. It was established in 1986. The editor-in-chief is Alessandro Serretti (University of Bologna).

== Abstracting and indexing ==
The journal is abstracted and indexed in:

- Biological Abstracts
- BIOSIS Previews
- Current Contents/Clinical Medicine
- Current Contents/Life Sciences
- Embase
- Index Medicus/MEDLINE/PubMed
- PASCAL
- PsycINFO
- Science Citation Index Expanded
- Scopus

According to the Journal Citation Reports, the journal has a 2021 impact factor of 2.023.
