= Piot =

Piot is a proper name of French origin:

== Personal surname ==
- Adolphe Piot (1825–1910), French painter
- Christian Piot (b. 1947), Belgian goalkeeper
- Georges Piot (1896–1980), French rower
- Jean Piot (1890–1961), French fencer
- Peter Piot (b. 1949), Belgian scientist

== Geography ==
- Piz Piot, Swiss mountain
