= Piz Turba =

Mountain in Switzerland

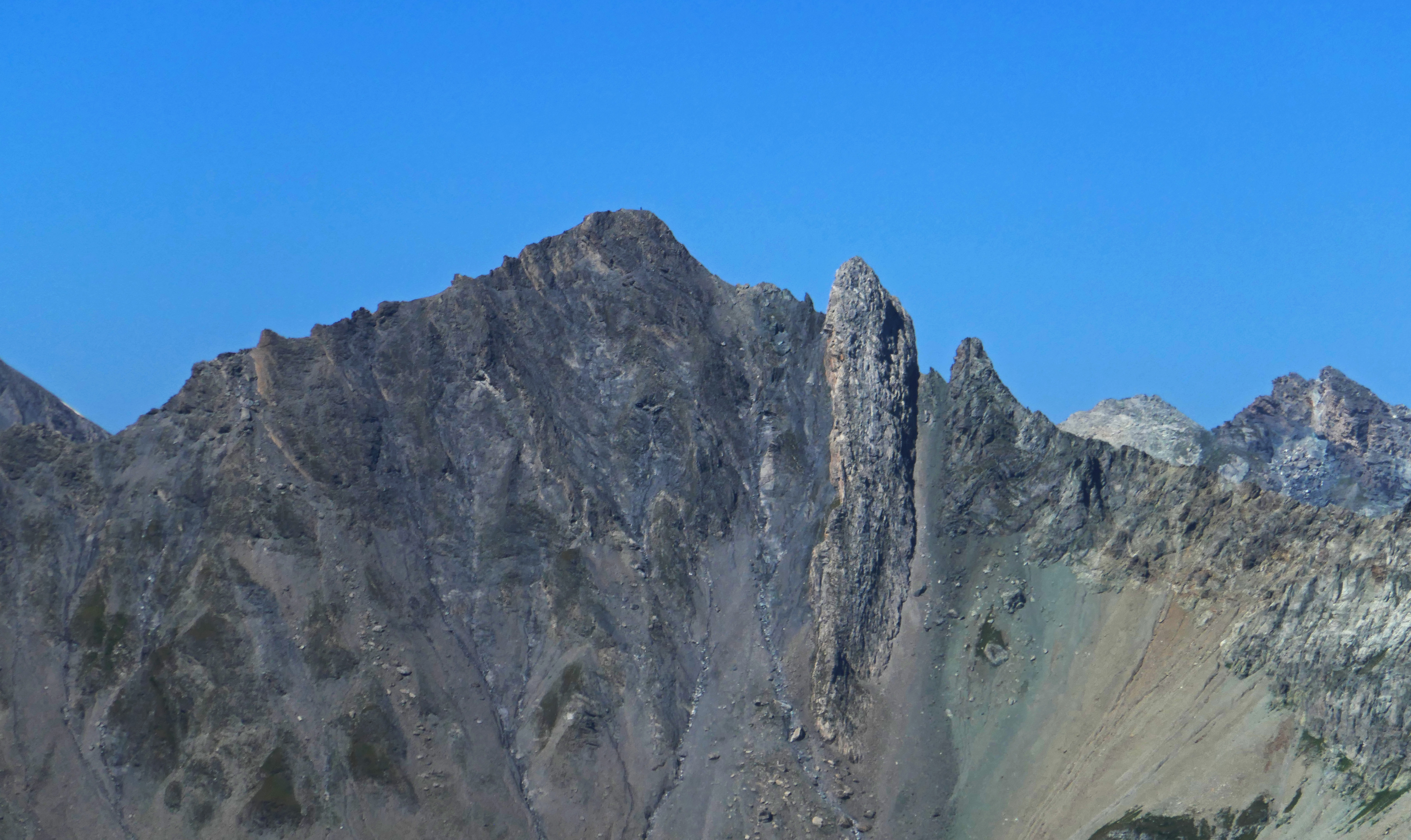

Highest point
- Elevation: 3,018 m (9,902 ft)
- Prominence: 253 m (830 ft)
- Parent peak: Gletscherhorn
- Coordinates: 46°24′37″N 9°36′21″E

Geography
- Location within Switzerland
- Location: Graubünden, Switzerland
- Parent range: Oberhalbstein Alps

Piz Turba is a mountain of the Oberhalbstein Alps, located between Juf and Casaccia, west of the Septimer Pass, in the canton of Graubünden.
