= Casaccia =

Casaccia may refer to:

- Casaccia, Graubünden, a village in the Val Bregaglia, in the Swiss canton of Graubünden
- Casaccia, Ticino, a settlement in the Barbengo quarter of the Swiss city of Lugano
- Casaccia (surname), surname

== See also ==
- Casazza
