= Casaccia (surname) =

Casaccia is an Italian surname. Notable people with the surname include:

- Gabriel Casaccia (1907–1980), Paraguayan novelist
- Patrizia Casaccia, Italian neuroscientist

== See also ==
- Casaccia (disambiguation)
