= Mazzaspitz =

Mountain in Switzerland

Piz Polaschin
- Location within Switzerland

Highest point
- Elevation: 3,164 m (10,381 ft)
- Prominence: 247 m (810 ft)
- Parent peak: Piz Platta
- Coordinates: 46°27′54″N 9°34′26″E

Geography
- Location: Graubünden, Switzerland
- Parent range: Oberhalbstein Alps

The Mazzaspitz (3,164 m) is a mountain of the Oberhalbstein Alps, overlooking Juf in the canton of Graubünden. It lies south of Piz Platta, on the range between the valley of Avers and the Val Bercla.
