= Neuropharmacology =

Field of study

Neuropharmacology is the study of how drugs affect function in the nervous system, and the neural mechanisms through which they influence behavior. There are two main branches of neuropharmacology: behavioral and molecular. Behavioral neuropharmacology focuses on the study of how drugs affect human behavior (neuropsychopharmacology), including the study of how drug dependence and addiction affect the human brain. Molecular neuropharmacology involves the study of neurons and their neurochemical interactions, with the overall goal of developing drugs that have beneficial effects on neurological function. Both of these fields are closely connected, since both are concerned with the interactions of neurotransmitters, neuropeptides, neurohormones, neuromodulators, enzymes, second messengers, co-transporters, ion channels, and receptor proteins in the central and peripheral nervous systems. Studying these interactions, researchers are developing drugs to treat many different neurological disorders, including pain, neurodegenerative diseases such as Parkinson's disease and Alzheimer's disease, psychological disorders, addiction, and many others.

== History ==
Neuropharmacology did not appear in the scientific field until, in the early part of the 20th century, scientists were able to figure out a basic understanding of the nervous system and how nerves communicate between one another. Before this discovery, there were drugs that had been found that demonstrated some type of influence on the nervous system. In the 1930s, French scientists began working with a compound called phenothiazine in the hope of synthesizing a drug that would be able to combat malaria. Though this drug showed very little hope in the use against malaria-infected individuals, it was found to have sedative effects along with what appeared to be beneficial effects toward patients with Parkinson's disease. This black box method, wherein an investigator would administer a drug and examine the response without knowing how to relate drug action to patient response, was the main approach to this field, until, in the late 1940s and early 1950s, scientists were able to identify specific neurotransmitters, such as norepinephrine (involved in the constriction of blood vessels and the increase in heart rate and blood pressure), dopamine (the chemical whose shortage is involved in Parkinson's disease), and serotonin (soon to be recognized as deeply connected to depression). In the 1950s, scientists also became better able to measure levels of specific neurochemicals in the body and thus correlate these levels with behavior. The invention of the voltage clamp in 1949 allowed for the study of ion channels and the nerve action potential. These two major historical events in neuropharmacology allowed scientists not only to study how information is transferred from one neuron to another but also to study how a neuron processes this information within itself.

== Neurochemical interactions ==
Labeling of different parts of a neuron

To understand the potential advances in medicine that neuropharmacology can bring, it is important to understand how human behavior and thought processes are transferred from neuron to neuron and how medications can alter the chemical foundations of these processes.

Neurons are known as excitable cells because on its surface membrane there are an abundance of proteins known as ion-channels that allow small charged particles to pass in and out of the cell. The structure of the neuron allows chemical information to be received by its dendrites, propagated through the perikaryon (cell body) and down its axon, and eventually passing on to other neurons through its axon terminal. These voltage-gated ion channels allow for rapid depolarization throughout the cell. This depolarization, if it reaches a certain threshold, will cause an action potential. Once the action potential reaches the axon terminal, it will cause an influx of calcium ions into the cell. The calcium ions will then cause vesicles, small packets filled with neurotransmitters, to bind to the cell membrane and release its contents into the synapse. This cell is known as the pre-synaptic neuron, and the cell that interacts with the neurotransmitters released is known as the post-synaptic neuron. Once the neurotransmitter is released into the synapse, it can either bind to receptors on the post-synaptic cell, the pre-synaptic cell can re-uptake it and save it for later transmission, or it can be broken down by enzymes in the synapse specific to that certain neurotransmitter. These three different actions are major areas where drug action can affect communication between neurons.

There are two types of receptors that neurotransmitters interact with on a post-synaptic neuron. The first types of receptors are ligand-gated ion channels or LGICs. LGIC receptors are the fastest types of transduction from chemical signal to electrical signal. Once the neurotransmitter binds to the receptor, it will cause a conformational change that will allow ions to directly flow into the cell. The second types are known as G-protein-coupled receptors or GPCRs. These are much slower than LGICs due to an increase in the amount of biochemical reactions that must take place intracellularly. Once the neurotransmitter binds to the GPCR protein, it causes a cascade of intracellular interactions that can lead to many different types of changes in cellular biochemistry, physiology, and gene expression. Neurotransmitter/receptor interactions in the field of neuropharmacology are extremely important because many drugs that are developed today have to do with disrupting this binding process.

== Molecular neuropharmacology ==
Molecular neuropharmacology involves the study of neurons and their neurochemical interactions, and receptors on neurons, with the goal of developing new drugs that will treat neurological disorders such as pain, neurodegenerative diseases, and psychological disorders (also known in this case as neuropsychopharmacology). There are a few technical words that must be defined when relating neurotransmission to receptor action:

1. Agonist – a molecule that binds to a receptor protein and activates that receptor
2. Competitive antagonist – a molecule that binds to the same site on the receptor protein as the agonist, preventing activation of the receptor
3. Non-competitive antagonist – a molecule that binds to a receptor protein on a different site than that of the agonist, but causes a conformational change in the protein that does not allow activation.

The following neurotransmitter/receptor interactions can be affected by synthetic compounds that act as one of the three above. Sodium/potassium ion channels can also be manipulated throughout a neuron to induce inhibitory effects of action potentials.

=== GABA ===
The GABA neurotransmitter mediates the fast synaptic inhibition in the central nervous system. When GABA is released from its pre-synaptic cell, it will bind to a receptor (most likely the GABA_{A} receptor) that causes the post-synaptic cell to hyperpolarize (stay below its action potential threshold). This will lower the effect of any excitatory manipulation from other neurotransmitter/receptor interactions.

This GABA_{A} receptor contains many binding sites that allow conformational changes and are the primary target for drug development, of which the benzodiazepine binding site is the most common. This benzodiazepine site allows for both agonist and antagonist effects on the receptor. A common drug, diazepam, acts as an allosteric enhancer at this binding site.

Another receptor for GABA, known as GABA_{B}, can be activated by a molecule called baclofen. This molecule acts as an agonist, therefore activating the receptor, and is known to help control and decrease spastic movement.

=== Dopamine ===
The dopamine neurotransmitter mediates synaptic transmission by binding to five specific GPCRs. These five receptor proteins are separated into two classes due to whether the response elicits an excitatory (D_{1}-like) or inhibitory (D_{2}-like) response on the post-synaptic cell. There are many types of drugs, legal and illegal, that affect dopamine and its interactions in the brain.

In Parkinson's disease, a disease that decreases the amount of dopamine in the brain, the dopamine precursor Levodopa can be given to the patient. This is due to the fact that dopamine cannot cross the blood–brain barrier, and L-dopa can. Some dopamine agonists are also given to Parkinson's patients that have a disorder known as restless leg syndrome or RLS. Some examples of these are ropinirole and pramipexole.

Neurodevelopmental disorders like that of attention deficit hyperactivity disorder (ADHD) can be treated with drugs like methylphenidate. These drugs block the reuptake of dopamine by the pre-synaptic cell, thereby providing an increase of dopamine left in the synaptic cleft. This increase in synaptic dopamine will increase binding to receptors of the post-synaptic cell. This same mechanism is also used by other illegal and more potent stimulant drugs such as cocaine.

=== Serotonin ===
The neurotransmitter serotonin has the ability to mediate synaptic transmission through either metabotropic or ionotropic receptors. The excitatory or inhibitory post-synaptic effects of serotonin are determined by the type of receptor expressed in a given brain region. The most popular and widely used drugs for the regulation of serotonin during depression are known as selective serotonin reuptake inhibitors (SSRIs). These drugs inhibit the transport of serotonin back into the pre-synaptic neuron, leaving more serotonin in the synaptic cleft.

Monoamine oxidase inhibitors (MAOIs) inhibited the enzyme that breaks down serotonin, therby increasing the amount of serotonin in the synapse. However, they have many side-effects including intense migraines and high blood pressure. This was eventually linked to the drugs interacting with a common chemical known as tyramine found in many types of food.

=== Ion channels ===
Ion channels located on the surface membrane of the neuron allows for an influx of sodium ions and outward movement of potassium ions during an action potential. Selectively blocking these ion channels will decrease the likelihood of an action potential to occur.

The drug riluzole is a neuroprotective drug that blocks sodium ion channels. Through inhibiting these channels, there is no action potential, and the neuron does not perform any transduction of chemical signals into electrical signals and the signal does not move on. This drug is used as an anesthetic as well as a sedative.

== Behavioral neuropharmacology ==
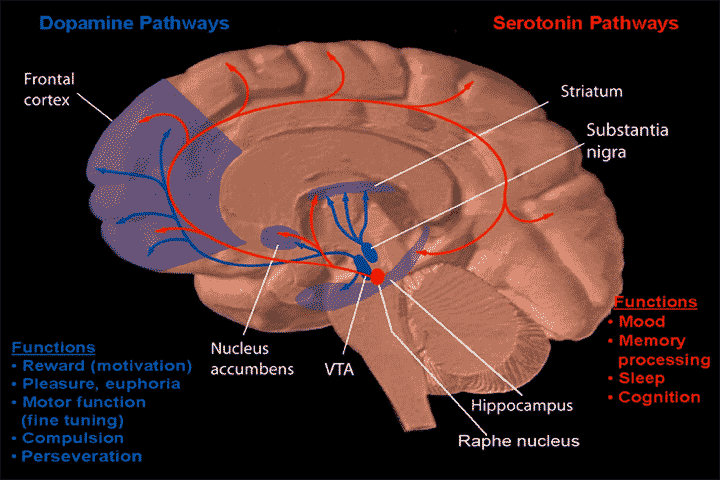
Dopamine and serotonin pathway

One form of behavioral neuropharmacology focuses on the study of drug dependence and how drug addiction affects the human mind. Most research has shown that the major part of the brain that reinforces addiction through neurochemical reward is the nucleus accumbens. The image to the right shows how dopamine is projected into this area. Long-term excessive alcohol use can cause dependence and addiction.

=== Ethanol ===
Alcohol's rewarding and reinforcing (i.e., addictive) properties are mediated through its effects on dopamine neurons in the mesolimbic reward pathway, which connects the ventral tegmental area to the nucleus accumbens (NAcc). One of alcohol's primary effects is the allosteric inhibition of NMDA receptors and facilitation of GABA_{A} receptors (e.g., enhanced GABA_{A} receptor-mediated chloride flux through allosteric regulation of the receptor). At high doses, ethanol inhibits most ligand gated ion channels and voltage gated ion channels in neurons as well. Alcohol inhibits sodium–potassium pumps in the cerebellum and this is likely how it impairs cerebellar computation and body co-ordination.

With acute alcohol consumption, dopamine is released in the synapses of the mesolimbic pathway, in turn heightening activation of postsynaptic D1 receptors. The activation of these receptors triggers postsynaptic internal signaling events through protein kinase A which ultimately phosphorylate cAMP response element binding protein (CREB), inducing CREB-mediated changes in gene expression.

With chronic alcohol intake, consumption of ethanol similarly induces CREB phosphorylation through the D1 receptor pathway, but it also alters NMDA receptor function through phosphorylation mechanisms; an adaptive downregulation of the D1 receptor pathway and CREB function occurs as well. Chronic consumption is also associated with an effect on CREB phosphorylation and function via postsynaptic NMDA receptor signaling cascades through a MAPK/ERK pathway and CAMK-mediated pathway. These modifications to CREB function in the mesolimbic pathway induce expression (i.e., increase gene expression) of ΔFosB in the NAcc, where ΔFosB is the "master control protein" that, when overexpressed in the NAcc, is necessary and sufficient for the development and maintenance of an addictive state (i.e., its overexpression in the nucleus accumbens produces and then directly modulates compulsive alcohol consumption).

== Research ==
=== Parkinson's disease ===
Parkinson's disease is a neurodegenerative disease described by the selective loss of dopaminergic neurons located in the substantia nigra. Today, the most commonly used drug to combat this disease is levodopa or L-DOPA. This precursor to dopamine can penetrate through the blood–brain barrier, whereas the neurotransmitter dopamine cannot. There has been extensive research to determine whether L-dopa is a better treatment for Parkinson's disease rather than other dopamine agonists. Some believe that the long-term use of L-dopa will compromise neuroprotection and, thus, eventually lead to dopaminergic cell death. Though there has been no proof, in-vivo or in-vitro, some still believe that the long-term use of dopamine agonists is better for the patient.

=== Alzheimer's disease ===
While there are a variety of hypotheses that have been proposed for the cause of Alzheimer's disease, the knowledge of this disease is far from complete to explain, making it difficult to develop methods for treatment. In the brain of Alzheimer's patients, both neuronal nicotinic acetylcholine (nACh) receptors and NMDA receptors are known to be down-regulated. Thus, four anticholinesterases, such as Donepezil and Rivastigmine, have been developed and approved by the U.S. Food and Drug Administration (FDA) for the treatment in the U.S.A. However, these are not ideal drugs, considering their side-effects and limited effectiveness. The excessive stimulation of muscarinic and nicotinic receptors by acetylcholine may contribute to the side effects that anticholinesterases have.

One promising drug, nefiracetam, is being developed for the treatment of Alzheimer's and other patients with dementia, and has unique actions in potentiating the activity of both nACh receptors and NMDA receptors.

=== Epilepsy ===
Epilepsy is a neurological disorder characterized by recurrent seizures caused by abnormal neuronal hyperexcitability. Neuropharmacological research in epilepsy often uses in vitro and in vivo models to study mechanisms of seizure generation and to evaluate experimental antiseizure compounds. For example, the synthetic molecule BICS01 has been shown to reversibly suppress epileptiform bursting in high‑potassium hippocampal slice models, although it did not protect against seizures in the pentylenetetrazol (PTZ) mouse model.

=== Future ===
With advances in technology and our understanding of the nervous system, the development of drugs will continue with increasing drug sensitivity and specificity. Structure–activity relationships are a major area of research within neuropharmacology; an attempt to modify the effect or the potency (i.e., activity) of bioactive chemical compounds by modifying their chemical structures.

== See also ==
- Electrophysiology
- Neuroendocrinology
- Neuropsychopharmacology
- Neurotechnology
- Neurotransmission
- Psychopharmacology
- Structure–activity relationship
