= Lisa Monteggia =

American neuroscientist

- Education: University of Illinois at Urbana-Champaign, Chicago Medical School
- Awards: 2005 Daniel X. Freedman Award from NARSAD for Outstanding Research, 2011 Rising Star Award from the International Mental Health Research Organization, 2011 Daniel H. Efron Award for Outstanding Basic/Translational Research by the American College of Neuropsychopharmacology
- Scientific career
- Fields: Neuroscience, pharmacology
- Workplaces: Vanderbilt University, UT Southwestern

Lisa M. Monteggia is an American neuroscientist, who is a professor in the Department of Pharmacology, Psychiatry & Psychology as well as the Barlow Family Director of the Vanderbilt Brain Institute at Vanderbilt University in Nashville, Tennessee. Monteggia probes the molecular mechanisms underlying psychiatric disorders and has made critical discoveries about the role of the neurotrophins in antidepressant efficacy, the antidepressant mechanisms of Ketamine, as well as the epigenetic regulation of synaptic transmission by MeCP2.

== Early life and education ==
Monteggia pursued her undergraduate education at the University of Illinois at Urbana-Champaign. In 1989, she completed a bachelors of science in microbiology and then went on to complete a masters of science in biology at the University of Illinois as well. In 1991, Monteggia moved to work for pharmaceutical company Abbott Laboratories, in Abbott Park, Illinois, where she held the position of Associate Scientist from 1991 to 1994, and was then promoted to scientist in 1994.

Monteggia began her PhD at Chicago Medical School at Rosalind Franklin University under the mentorship of Marina Wolf, probing the neurobiology of drug abuse in rodents, specifically the role of glutamate in neuroadaptations. Monteggia found that the expression of the glutamate receptor NMDAR1 drastically decreases in the ventral midbrain, nucleus accumbens, and prefrontal cortex two weeks after the onset of drug abstinence. For her dissertation, titled “Glutamate Receptors and Amphetamine Sensitization”, Monteggia found that after 14 days of withdrawal following chronic administration of amphetamine, glutamate receptor expression in the ventral tegmental area (VTA) did not change but while glutamate receptor expression in the substantia nigra was decreased. These findings indicate that increased excitatory drive of VTA dopamine neurons following chronic amphetamine administration must result from alternative mechanisms than modulation of glutamate receptor expression.

Monteggia pursued her postdoctoral training at Yale University under the mentorship of Eric J. Nestler in the Department of Psychiatry. During her postdoctoral studies, Monteggia published a first author paper cloning and characterizing the expression of various neuronal pacemaker channels called hyperpolarization-activated, cyclic nucleotide-gated channels 1-4 (HCN1-4). The distinct expression patterns of these channels across regions might highlight the unique ways in which neuronal pacemaker cells affect different brain systems.

== Career and research ==
Monteggia was recruited to UT Southwestern in Dallas, Texas as research assistant professor in the Department of Psychiatry. She held this position from 2000 until 2002, when she was promoted to assistant professor of the Department of Psychiatry. Monteggia built her research program around exploring the effects of neurotrophins on antidepressant behaviors as well as the role of Methyl-CpG-binding protein 2 (MeCP2) on synaptic plasticity. The |MeCP2 gene is known to be linked to Rett syndrome. In 2014, Monteggia and her lab used a novel inducible knockout system to selectively knock out Brain-derived Neurotrophic Factor in the forebrains of mice to explore the role of BDNF in complex behaviors. They found that depletion of BDNF impaired hippocampal learning and long-term potentiation and that a loss of BDNF also impaired the effects of the antidepressant, desipramine. Monteggia's group then showed that selective loss of BDNF in the dentate gyrus region of the hippocampus, but not the CA1 region, attenuates the effects of the antidepressants desipramine and citalopram during the forced swim test. Their findings suggest that the actions of antidepressants on specifically the dentate gyrus region of the hippocampus mediate their therapeutic effects.

Monteggia found in 2006 that MeCP2 acts as a transcriptional silencer to control synaptic transmission at excitatory presynaptic membranes. A critical follow up to this study was done by Monteggia and her lab in 2009. Since MeCP2 is thought to effect its transcriptional silencing alongside histone deacetylases (HDACs), they chronically inhibited HDACs in the basolateral amygdala and found similar behavioral effects as when they knockout MeCP2. These findings highlight the role of MeCP2 in transcriptional silencing and further that its loss of function in the BLA might be responsible for the behaviors associated with Rett Syndrome.

In 2009, Monteggia was promoted to tenure-track associate professor and in 2010 she was honored with the Ginny and John Eulich Professorship in Autism Spectrum Disorders. In 2013, Monteggia was promoted to full professor and she remained at UT Southwestern until 2018. Monteggia continued to probe the functions of MeCP2 in the central nervous system (CNS) as well as further explore the mechanisms of actions of BDNF in mediating the effects of antidepressants. She reported on the efficacy and validity of the use of transgenic mouse models in the study of neuropsychiatric disorders, such as MeCP2 knockout mice for studying Rett Syndrome. Monteggia also started to explore the rapid antidepressant effects of ketamine and why memantine does not have these same effects. In addition to validating clinical findings of these drugs in animal models, she showed that their effects on NMDAR-mediated neurotransmission and intracellular signalling pathways differ. Monteggia and Ege Kavalali discovered that ketamine modulates homeostatic plasticity in the hippocampus, which strongly correlates with the antidepressant effects and has been proposed to mediate the behavioral effects. They put forth the novel hypothesis that homeostatic synaptic plasticity may be a target for the treatment of mood disorders based on their work with ketamine and lithium.

In 2018, Monteggia was recruited to Vanderbilt University in Nashville, Tennessee to become the Barlow Family Director of the Vanderbilt Brain Institute as well as professor of pharmacology, psychiatry & psychology. She is also a Vanderbilt Kennedy Center Investigator based on her work elucidating the role of MeCP2 in the neurodevelopmental disorder Rett Syndrome. Monteggia's Lab continues to study neurotrophins and their effects on antidepressant efficacy, the rapid antidepressant actions of ketamine, as well as the epigenetic regulation of synapse function which includes further investigations of the transcriptional depressor MeCP2 and its role in Rett Syndrome manifestation.

Monteggia is an associate editor of Neuropsychopharmacology, a member of the editorial boards of the Journal of Neuroscience, Journal of Biological Chemistry and Biological Psychiatry, and a reviewing editor for eLife.

== Awards ==
- 2001, 2003 young investigator award from the National Alliance for Research on Schizophrenia and Depression
- 2005 Daniel X. Freedman Award from NARSAD for outstanding research
- 2010 Independent Investigator Award, NARSAD
- 2011 Rising Star Award from the International Mental Health Research Organization
- 2011 Daniel H. Efron Research Award for outstanding basic/translational research by the American College of Neuropsychopharmacology
- 2014 Distinguished Investigator Award, NARSAD
- 2022 Elected to membership in the National Academy of Medicine
- 2022 Awarded the Anna-Monika Prize for significant advances in neurobiology and treatment of depressive disorders

== Selected publications ==
- Lin PY, Kavalali ET, Monteggia LM (2018) Genetic dissection of pre- and postsynaptic BDNF-TrkB signaling in synaptic efficacy of CA3-CA1 synapses. Cell Reports, in press.
- Monteggia LM, Lin PY, Adachi M, Kavalali ET (2018) Behavioral analysis of SNAP-25 and Synaptobrevin-2 haploinsufficiency in mice. Neuroscience, in press.
- Horvath PM, Monteggia LM (2017) Engineering MeCP2 to spy on its targets. Nature Medicine 41(2):72-74.
- Gideons ES, Lin PY, Mahgoub M, Kavalali ET, Monteggia LM (2017) Chronic lithium treatment elicits its antimanic effects via BDNF-TrkB dependent synaptic downscaling. eLife 6. Pii: e25480.
- Suzuki K, Nosyreva E, Hunt KW, Kavalali ET, Monteggia LM (2017) The ketamine metabolite hydroxynorketamine impacts downstream signaling via NMDA receptor inhibition. Nature 546(7659):E1-E3.
- Mahgoub M, Adachi M, Suzuki K, Liu X, Kavalali ET, Chahrour M, Monteggia LM (2016) MeCP2 and Histone Deacetylases 1 and 2 in Dorsal Striatum Collectively Suppress Repetitive Behaviors. Nature Neurosci (in press).
- Antidepressant actions of ketamine: from molecular mechanisms to clinical practice. Current Opinion in Neurobiology 30:139-143.
- Monteggia LM, Malenka RC, Deisseroth K (2014) Depression: The best way forward. Nature 515:200-201.
- Gideons ES, Kavalali ET, Monteggia LM (2014) Mechanisms underlying differential effectiveness of memantine and ketamine in rapid antidepressant responses. Proc Natl Acad Sci, 111(23):8649-8655.
- Morris MJ, Na ES, Adachi M, Monteggia LM (2014) Selective role for DNMT3a in learning and memory. Neurobiol Learn Mem S1074-7427(14)00119-1.
- Mahgoub M, Monteggia LM (2014) A role for histone deacetylases in the cellular and behavioral mechanisms underlying learning and memory. Learn Mem 21(10):564-568.
- Costa-Mattioli M, Monteggia LM (2013) mTOR complexes in neurodevelopmental and neuropsychiatric disorders Nature Neuroscience 16(11):1537-1543.
- Monteggia LM, Kavalali ET (2013) Scopolamine and ketamine: evidence of convergence? Biological Psychiatry 74(10):712-713.
- Morris MJ, Na ES, Mahgoub M, Pranav H, Monteggia LM (2013) Loss of histone deacetylase 2 improves working memory and accelerates extinction learning. J Neurosci. 33(15):6401-6411.
- Na ES, Nelson ED, Adachi M, Autry AE, Mahgoub MA, Jaenisch R, Kavalali ET, Monteggia LM (2012) A mouse model for MeCP2 duplication syndrome: MeCP2 overexpression impairs learning and memory and synaptic transmission. J Neuroscience 32(9):3109-3117.
- Autry A. E., Adachi M., Nosyreva E, Na ES, Los MF, Cheng P, Kavalali, ET, Monteggia LM (2011) NMDA Receptor Blockade at Rest Triggers Rapid Behavioural Antidepressant Responses. Nature 275(7354):91-95.
- Nelson ED, Kavalali ET, Monteggia LM (2011) Selective Impact of MeCP2 and associated Histone Deacetylases on the Dynamics of Evoked Excitatory Neurotransmission. J Neurophysiol 106(1):193-201.
- Autry AE, Adachi M, Cheng P, Monteggia LM (2009) Gender Specific Impact of BDNF signaling on Stress-Induced Depression-Like Behavior. Biol Psychiatry, 66(1):84-90.
- Adachi M, Autry AE, Covington HE 3rd, Monteggia LM (2009) MeCP2-mediated Transcription Repression in the basolateral amygdala may underlie heightened anxiety in a mouse model of Rett Syndrome. J Neurosci 29(13):4218-4227.
- Adachi M, Barrot M, Autry A, Theobald D, Monteggia LM (2008) Selective loss of brain-derived neurotrophic factor in the dentate gyrus attenuates antidepressant efficacy. Biol Psychiatry 63:642-649.
- Monteggia LM, Luikart B, Barrot M, Nef S, Parada LF, Nestler EJ. (2007) BDNF Conditional Knockouts Show Gender Differences in Depression Related Behaviors. Biol Psychiatry, 61(2):187-197.
- Monteggia LM, Barrot M, Powell C, Berton O, Galanis V, Nagy A, Greene RW, Nestler EJ (2004) Essential Role of BDNF in Adult Hippocampal Function and Depression. Proc Natl Acad Sci, 101(29):10827-10832.
