= Juf =

Village in Switzerland

Coordinates: 46°26′44″N 9°34′45″E

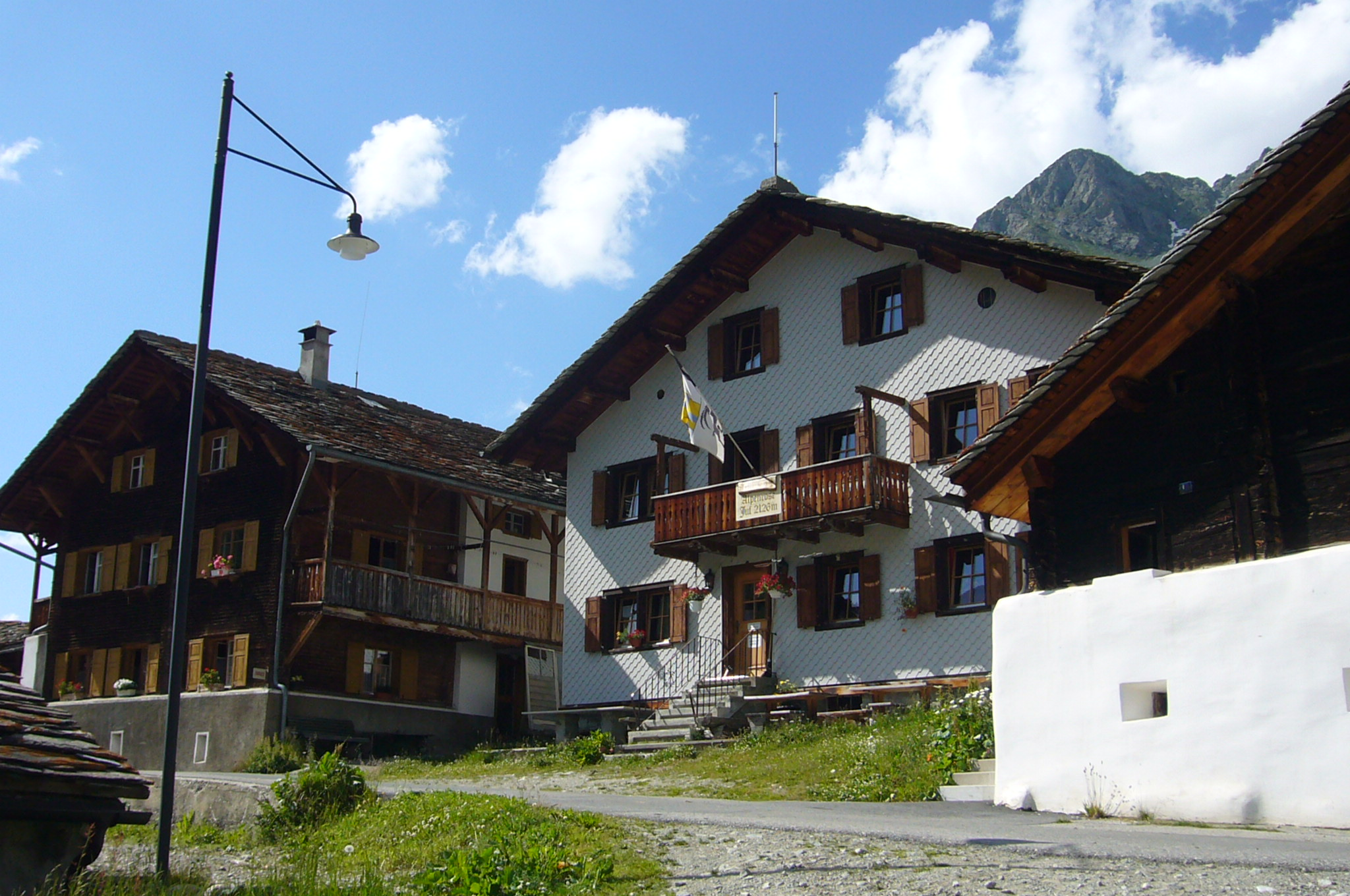
Highest section of Juf

Juf (Romansh pronunciation: [ˈjuf]) is a village in the municipality of Avers in the canton of Grisons, Switzerland. At 2,126 metres (6,975 ft) above sea level, it is historically the highest village with permanent residents in Western Europe, as well as one of its coldest localities.

As of 2016, Juf had a population of 31 inhabitants divided between six families in a concentrated settlement. They were 20 in 1991 and 30 in 2001. The first inhabitants were immigrant Walser who arrived in 1292.

== Geography and climate ==
Juf is located just above the right banks of the river Jufer Rhein, before its confluence with the Bergalgabach, both forming the Avers Rhine. The small Jufer Rhein valley is enclosed by several summits over 3,000 metre-high, the highest being Mazzaspitz, Piz Piot and Piz Turba. The valley is almost entirely above 2,000 metres.

Juf differs from settlements in lower valleys in being well above the tree line, the nearest forest being about 5 kilometres away from the village. As a result, the area experiences a cold and wet climate, classified as an alpine tundra climate (ET), with average temperatures far lower than those of La Brévine, traditionally considered the coldest inhabited place in Switzerland. Snowfalls are possible even during summer.

Wood was transported for building houses and stables, but historically, dry dung fuel from the inhabitants’ animals was burned for fuel. Old structures for drying manure can still be seen on the southern ends of some Juf stables.

Juf is composed of two distinct sections: the highest (2,126 m), at the village entry, and the lowest (2,117 m), at the end of the paved road and near the river.

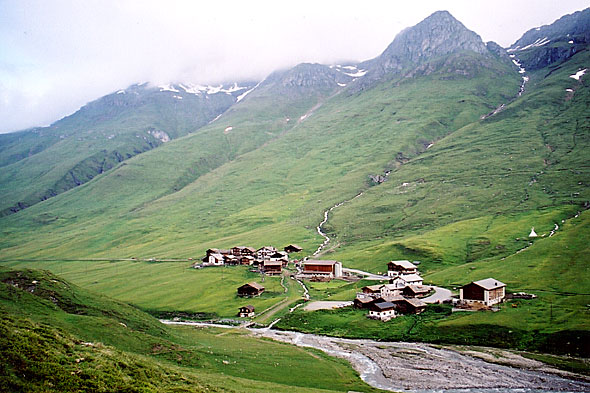
Juf in summer

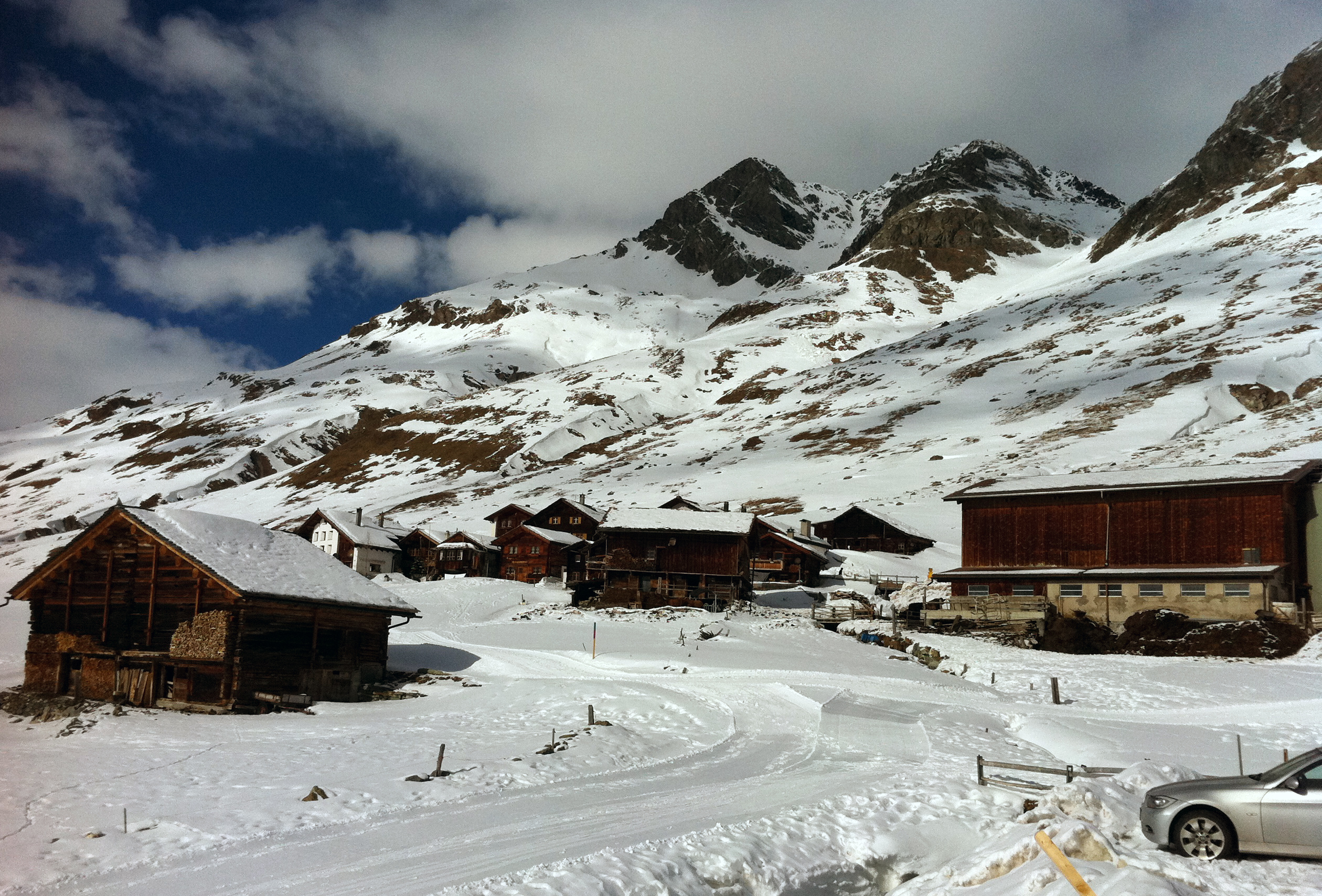
Juf in winter

== Transport ==
Despite its remote location, Juf can be reached by public transport eight times a day all year round, as all post buses running to the high valley of Avers go on to the very end of the road at Juf. It is nevertheless a very remote valley, its infrastructure designed primarily to encourage tourism (two platter lifts for skiing in winter at nearby Juppa), and has been spared the technical installations, such as power lines or tourist resorts, which might otherwise ruin its "pristine beauty".

== Note ==
Another source gives the title of Europe's highest village to Li Baita, a part of Trepalle, Italy, however without mentioning the number of residents. Just above Juf is an old farmhouse, the Platten-hof, birthplace of writer Johann Rudolf Stoffel. This is considered the highest farmhouse in Europe.

== See also ==
- Extreme points of Switzerland
