= Anne Schaefer (scientist) =

German neuroscientist

- Education: M.D. Johannes Gutenberg University Mainz in Germany, M.D. Charite University Berlin, in Germany, Postdoctoral Work The Rockefeller University
- Known for: Developing the TRAP technique to reveal transcriptional profiles by isolating ribosome associated mRNA
- Awards: Inventor of the Year 2018 Award, Inaugural NINDS Landis Award for Outstanding Mentorship, Harold and Golden Lamport Research Award, Kavli Frontiers in Science Fellow, Cure Challenge Award, Technology Development Fund Award, NIH Director’s New Innovator Award, Seaver Autism Center Research Award, 2010 NARSAD Young Investigator Award, German Research Foundation DFG Research Fellowship, Hans-Hench Award 2005 German Society for Immunology, USA-Scholarship of the German National Merit Foundation
- Scientific career
- Fields: Neuroscience, genetics, immunology
- Workplaces: Icahn School of Medicine at Mount Sinai, The Rockefeller University

Anne Schaefer is a neuroscientist, professor of Neuroscience, vice-chair of Neuroscience, and director of the Center for Glial Biology at the Icahn School of Medicine at Mount Sinai in New York City. Schaefer investigates the epigenetic mechanisms of cellular plasticity and their role in the regulation of microglia-neuron interactions. Her research is aimed at understanding the mechanisms underlying various neuropsychiatric disorders and finding novel ways to target the epigenome therapeutically.

== Early life and education ==
Schaefer started her medical training at Johannes Gutenberg University Mainz in Germany from 1996 until 1999. Schaefer continued her education by pursuing her MD at the Charite University Berlin, in Germany. She worked under the mentorship of Dr. Ralf Ignatius and then in 2001, Schaefer won the USA-Scholarship of the German National Merit Foundation and to pursue a research internship at The Rockefeller University. As a Visiting Student, Schaefer worked under the mentorship of Dr. Michel Nussenzweig at Rockefeller studying immunology, specifically the adaptive immune lymphocytes called B cells. In her research, she helped discover that 55-75% of the antibodies produced by immature B cells are actually auto-reactive and these B cells are removed from the population during two discrete check points in B cells development.

After her research internship, Schaefer stayed in New York City to complete a Medical Internship at Weill Cornell Medical College within the Sloan Kettering Cancer Center in 2003. Schaefer graduated from Charite University in 2004.

Schaefer came back to Rockefeller in 2004 to pursue postdoctoral training under the mentorship of Dr. Paul Greengard. In the Greengard Lab, Schaefer switched her research focus in the direction of neuroscience and explored epigenetic regulation of neural physiology.

== Career and research ==
Schaefer remained in Greengard’s lab as a research associate from 2007 to 2009 and was promoted to Senior Research Associate in 2009. She held this title until she started her own lab at Mount Sinai School of Medicine in 2011. Schaefer is currently a tenured professor in the Department of Neuroscience and Psychiatry at the Friedman Brain Institute at Mount Sinai School and remains an adjunct faculty member at Rockefeller University. In 2012 named the Chrissy Rossi Investigator at Mount Sinai. In 2017, Schaefer co-founded the Center for Glial Biology at Mount Sinai and is now the co-director of the center alongside Dr. Patrizia Casaccia. As of 2018, Schaefer was promoted to vice-chair of Neuroscience at Sinai. The Schaefer Lab studies the epigenetic mechanisms of cellular plasticity, maintenance of neuronal identity, as well as the role of epigenetics in regulating neuron-microglia interactions. One of the goals of her lab is to develop tools and therapies with which to target the epigenome to treat neurological disorders.

=== The neuronal epigenome ===
In 2007, Schaefer published a first author paper discussing the importance of microRNAs (miRNAs) in the regulation of neuronal gene expression. She showed that a conditional knockout of the miRNA generating enzyme, Dicer, lead to death of neurons in the cerebellum. Since loss of miRNA led to cerebellar degeneration, her findings highlight the potential role for dysregulation of miRNAs in neurodegenerative diseases. Further highlighting the role of genetic regulation in brain homeostasis, Schaefer showed in 2009 that a deficiency in the histone methyltransferase complex GLP/G9a leads to defects in learning, motivation, and environmental adaptation in rodents. Histone methyltransferases are a key regulator in gene expression. They manipulate the state of DNA, which can be either open, referred to as euchromatin or closed, referred to as heterochromatin. Later in her postdoc, Schafer helped elucidate the role of transcriptional regulation in the context of drug addiction in mice. She found that a deficiency in argonaute 2 (a gene known to regulate the generation of miRNA) in the dopamine receptor 2 (Drd2) positive cells in the striatum caused a decrease in the motivation to seek cocaine. Schaefer further explored which miRNAs are modulated by argonaute 2 to elucidate specifically which miRNAs might be important in mediating addition to cocaine.

Once Schaefer started her lab at Mount Sinai, she continued to probe the role of transcriptional regulation on neuronal function and driving behavior. In 2013, she published a paper in Science showing that a specific miRNA, miRNA-128, governs neuronal excitability and motor behavior in mice. When they suppressed this miRNA, aberrant motor patterns and fatal epilepsy resulted. Seeing how critical the presence of this one miRNA seemed to be in regulating neuronal excitability, Schaefer and Greengard filed a patent for using miRNA manipulation as a treatment for motor diseases and seizures. Overall, Schaefer's work has highlighted the importance of understanding epigenetics and transcriptional regulation in the context of brain related diseases.

=== Epigenetics and autism spectrum disorders ===
Schaefer's work has also increased our understanding of the epigenetic mechanisms contributing to Autism Spectrum Disorders. Her lab identified the bromodomain and extraterminal domain-containing proteins (BETs) as potent regulators of genes involved in generating ASD-type behaviors in mouse models. When they suppressed BET proteins they found decreased neuronal gene expression and neuronal dysfunction which suggested a role for the BET-controlled gene network in ASD. Following up on this work, Schaefer and her colleagues hypothesized that ASDs are disorders of gene regulatory networks which are inevitably influenced by both genetic and environmental factors, consistent with broad array of factors that we find linked to ASD development in humans.

=== Epigenetics and microglia ===
Another facet of Schaefer's work is understanding the impact of epigenetic regulation on neuroimmunity, with a particular focus on the innate immune cells of the brain, microglia. In a paper published in Nature Neuroscience in 2018, Schaefer and her colleagues showed that epigenetic regulation underlies differences in microglial behavior across different brain regions. They found that baseline phagocytic activity of microglia was high in the cerebellum but low in the striatum. Using the TRAP technique developed by Schaefer in 2011, they discovered that the polycomb repressive complex 2 (PRC2), which mediates repressive chromatin modifications, is actively repressing phagocytic phenotypes and morphological changes in striatal microglia. When they inhibited PRC2, microglia exhibited robust phagocytic activity even in the absence of dying neurons. These findings highlighted a critical role for epigenetic regulation of microglia in diseases where aberrantly activated microglia lead to over-pruning and neurodegeneration. To understand more deeply what drives the unique epigenetic programming of cerebellar versus striatal microglia, Schaefer collaborated with Dr. Miriam Merad’s group at Sinai to look at ontology of cerebellar versus striatal microglia. They found that cerebellar microglial identity was driven by interactions between CSF-1 and the CSF-1 receptor, and was not reliant on the alternate CSF-1R ligand, IL-34. When they depleted CSF-1, it led to disruptions in cerebellar microglia development as well as cerebellar neuron function but had no effect on the development of forebrain microglia.

=== Pharmaceutical industry involvement ===
In addition to her academic involvements, Schaefer is also a consultant for the pharmaceutical company Neuroinflammation NewCo and is involved in the committees and data safety monitoring of Eli Lilly, Genentech Inc, GlaxoSmithKline, and Regenxbio.

In 2011, Schaefer was part of a team that filed a patent for a method of translational profiling and molecular phenotyping of mRNAs from specific cell types. The TRAP (Translating Ribosome Affinity Purification) methodology that is described in this patent provides a way to detect genes that are co-regulated within or across cell types, as well as discover candidate gene targets for treating specific neurological disorders and screen for modulators of those candidate genes. The method involves isolating mRNAs that are in complex with a ribosome that is presumably in the process of translating the mRNA. The TRAP technique is now widely used by scientists to find vulnerable cell types or modulators associated with particular diseases.

In 2013, Schaefer and her postdoctoral advisor, Dr. Paul Greengard, filed a patent for a therapeutic strategy to treat or reduce the likelihood of seizures. Schaefer and Greengard found that the microRNA miR-128 is involved in modulating neuronal excitability and motor activity. Their therapeutic strategy involves administering miR-128, an agent with 90% sequence homology, or an agent capable of increasing the expression or activity of miR-128 as a means to control dopamine receptor 1 (Drdr1) neuron excitability. The agent would be administered intrathecally, intranasally, or directly to the hippocampus or cortex via an injection.

== Awards and honors ==
- 1999–2003 Scholarship of the German National Merit Foundation
- 2001–2003 USA-Scholarship of the German National Merit Foundation
- 2003 Keystone Scholar Travel Award
- 2004 Summa cum laude, Charité University Berlin
- 2005 Hans-Hench Award 2005, German Society for Immunology, Germany
- 2006-2008 German Research Foundation DFG, Research Fellowship, Germany
- 2011 2010 NARSAD Young Investigator Award, USA
- 2012 named “Chrissy Rossi Investigator”
- 2012 Seaver Autism Center Research Award, USA
- 2012 NIH Director's New Innovator Award, USA
- 2014 Technology Development Fund Award, Mount Sinai Innovation, USA
- 2014 Cure Challenge Award, USA
- 2014 Kavli Frontiers in Science Fellow, The National Academy of Science, USA
- 2015 Harold and Golden Lamport Research Award, Mount Sinai, USA
- 2017 co-director, Center for Glial Biology, Mount Sinai School of Medicine, USA
- 2018 Inaugural NINDS Landis Award for Outstanding Mentorship, NIH, USA
- 2018 Inventor of the Year 2018 Award, Mount Sinai, USA
- 2019 Vice Chair of Neuroscience, Mount Sinai, USA
- 2019 Max Planck Sabbatical Award

== Selected publications ==
- Ayata, P; Schaefer, A (2020). "Innate sensing of mechanical properties of brain tissue by microglia". Curr Opin Immunol. 62: 123–130. doi:10.1016/j.coi.2020.01.003. PMC 7067639. PMID 32058296.
- Sullivan, JM; De Rubeis, S; Schaefer, A (2019). "Convergence of spectrums: neuronal gene network states in autism spectrum disorder". Curr Opin Neurobiol. 59: 102–111. doi:10.1016/j.conb.2019.04.011. PMC 6888864. PMID 31220745.
- Kana, V; Desland, FA; Casanova-Acebes, M; Ayata, P; Badimon, A; Nabel, E; Yamamuro, K; Sneeboer, M; Tan, IL; Flanigan, ME; Rose, SA; Chang, C; Leader, A; Le Bourhis, H; Sweet, ES; Tung, N; Wroblewska, A; Lavin, Y; See, P; Baccarini, A; Ginhoux, F; Chitu, V; Stanley, ER; Russo, SJ; Yue, Z; Brown, BD; Joyner, AL; De Witte, LD; Morishita, H; Schaefer, A; Merad, M (2019). "CSF-1 controls cerebellar microglia and is required for motor function and social interaction". J Exp Med. 216: 2265–2281. doi:10.1084/jem.20182037. PMC 6781012. PMID 31350310.
- Ayata, P; Badimon, A; Strasburger, HJ; Duff, MK; Montgomery, SE; Loh, YE; Ebert, A; Pimenova, AA; Ramirez, BR; Chan, AT; Sullivan, JM; Purushothaman, I; Scarpa, JR; Goate, AM; Busslinger, M; Shen, L; Losic, B; Schaefer, A (2018). "Epigenetic regulation of brain region-specific microglia clearance activity". Nat Neurosci. 21: 1049–1060. doi:10.1038/s41593-018-0192-3. PMC 6090564. PMID 30038282.
- von Schimmelmann, M; Feinberg, PA; Sullivan, JM; Ku, SM; Badimon, A; Duff, MK; Wang, Z; Lachmann, A; Dewell, S; Ma'Ayan, A; Han, MH; Tarakhovsky, A; Schaefer, A (2016). "Polycomb repressive complex 2 (PRC2) silences genes responsible for neurodegeneration". Nat Neurosci. 19: 1321–30. doi:10.1038/nn.4360. PMC 5088783. PMID 27526204.
- Sullivan, JM; Badimon, A; Schaefer, U; Ayata, P; Gray, J; Chung, CW; von Schimmelmann, M; Zhang, F; Garton, N; Smithers, N; Lewis, H; Tarakhovsky, A; Prinjha, RK; Schaefer, A (2015). "Autism-like syndrome is induced by pharmacological suppression of BET proteins in young mice". J Exp Med. 212: 1771–81. doi:10.1084/jem.20151271. PMC 4612093. PMID 26392221.
- Tan, CL; Plotkin, JL; Venø, MT; von Schimmelmann, M; Feinberg, P; Mann, S; Handler, A; Kjems, J; Surmeier, DJ; O'Carroll, D; Greengard, P; Schaefer, A (2013). "MicroRNA-128 governs neuronal excitability and motor behavior in mice". Science. 342: 1254–8. Bibcode:2013Sci...342.1254T. doi:10.1126/science.1244193. PMC 3932786. PMID 24311694.
- Schaefer, A; Im, HI; Venø, MT; Fowler, CD; Min, A; Intrator, A; Kjems, J; Kenny, PJ; O'Carroll, D; Greengard, P (2010). "Argonaute 2 in dopamine 2 receptor-expressing neurons regulates cocaine addiction". J Exp Med. 207: 1843–51. doi:10.1084/jem.20100451. PMC 2931161. PMID 20643829.
- Schaefer, A; Sampath, SC; Intrator, A; Min, A; Gertler, TS; Surmeier, DJ; Tarakhovsky, A; Greengard, P (2009). "Control of cognition and adaptive behavior by the GLP/G9a epigenetic suppressor complex". Neuron. 64: 678–91. doi:10.1016/j.neuron.2009.11.019. PMC 2814156. PMID 20005824.
- Schaefer, A; O'Carroll, D; Tan, CL; et al. (July 2007). "Cerebellar neurodegeneration in the absence of microRNAs". J. Exp. Med. 204: 1553–8. doi:10.1084/jem.20070823. PMC 2118654. PMID 17606634.
- Wardemann, H; Yurasov, S; Schaefer, A; Young, JW; Meffre, E; Nussenzweig, MC (2003). "Predominant autoantibody production by early human B cell precursors". Science. 301: 1374–7. Bibcode:2003Sci...301.1374W. doi:10.1126/science.1086907. PMID 12920303..
