= Piz Piot =

Mountain in Switzerland

- Location within Switzerland

Highest point
- Elevation: 3,053 m (10,016 ft)
- Prominence: 133 m (436 ft)
- Parent peak: Gletscherhorn
- Coordinates: 46°24′9.9″N 9°35′13.1″E

Geography
- Location: Graubünden, Switzerland
- Parent range: Oberhalbstein Alps

Piz Piot is a mountain of the Oberhalbstein Alps, located between Juf and Casaccia, in the canton of Graubünden.
