= Avers =

- Municipality
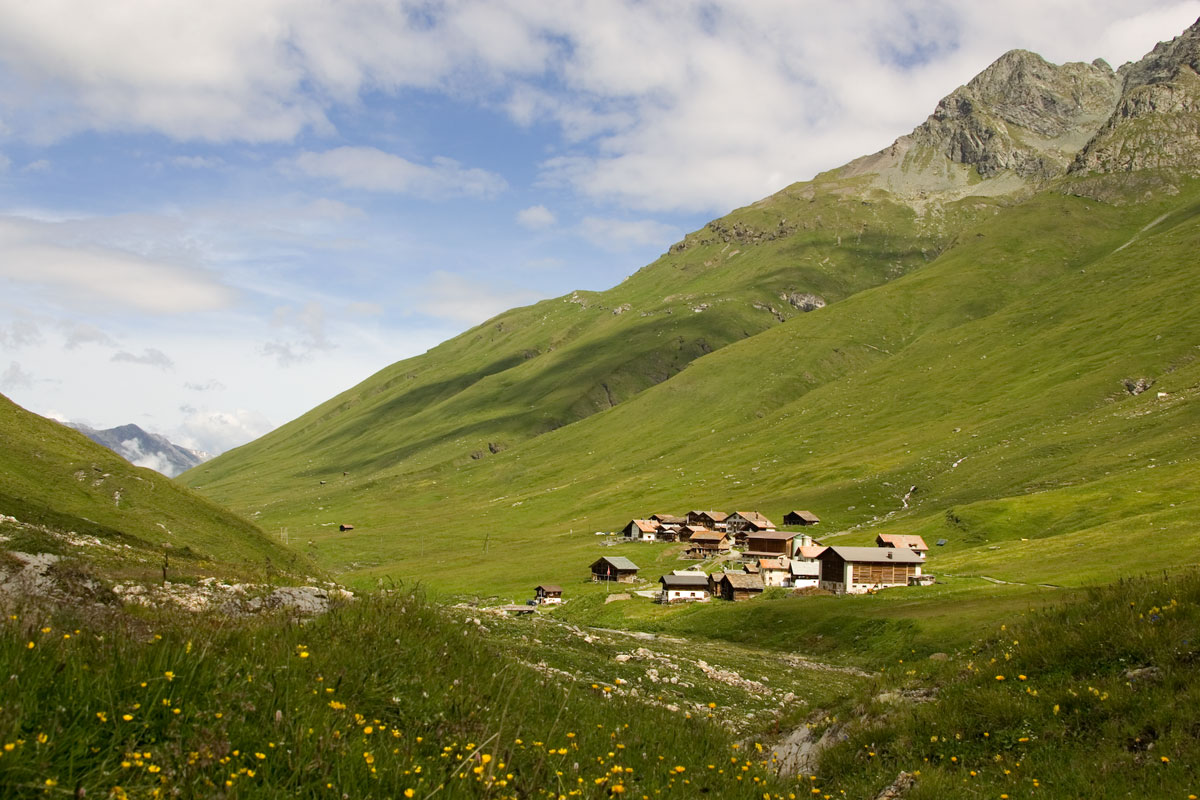

- Flag Coat of arms
- Location of Avers
- Location within Switzerland Location within Canton of Grisons
- Coordinates: 46°28′N 9°31′E
- Country: Switzerland
- Canton: Grisons
- District: Viamala

Area
  - Total: 93.07 km^{2} (35.93 sq mi)
- Elevation (Cresta): 1,960 m (6,430 ft)

Population (December 2020)
  - Total: 164
  - Density: 1.76/km^{2} (4.56/sq mi)
- Time zone: UTC+01:00 (CET)
  - Summer (DST): UTC+02:00 (CEST)
- Postal code: 7446-48
- SFOS number: 3681
- ISO 3166 code: CH-GR
- Localities: Juf, Juppa, Am Bach, Pürt, Cresta Avers, Underplatta, Oberplatta, Cröt, Campsut, Ramsa (Madrisch), Stettli (Madrisch)
- Surrounded by: Bivio, Ferrera, Mulegns, Piuro (IT-SO), Bregaglia
- Website: www.avers.ch

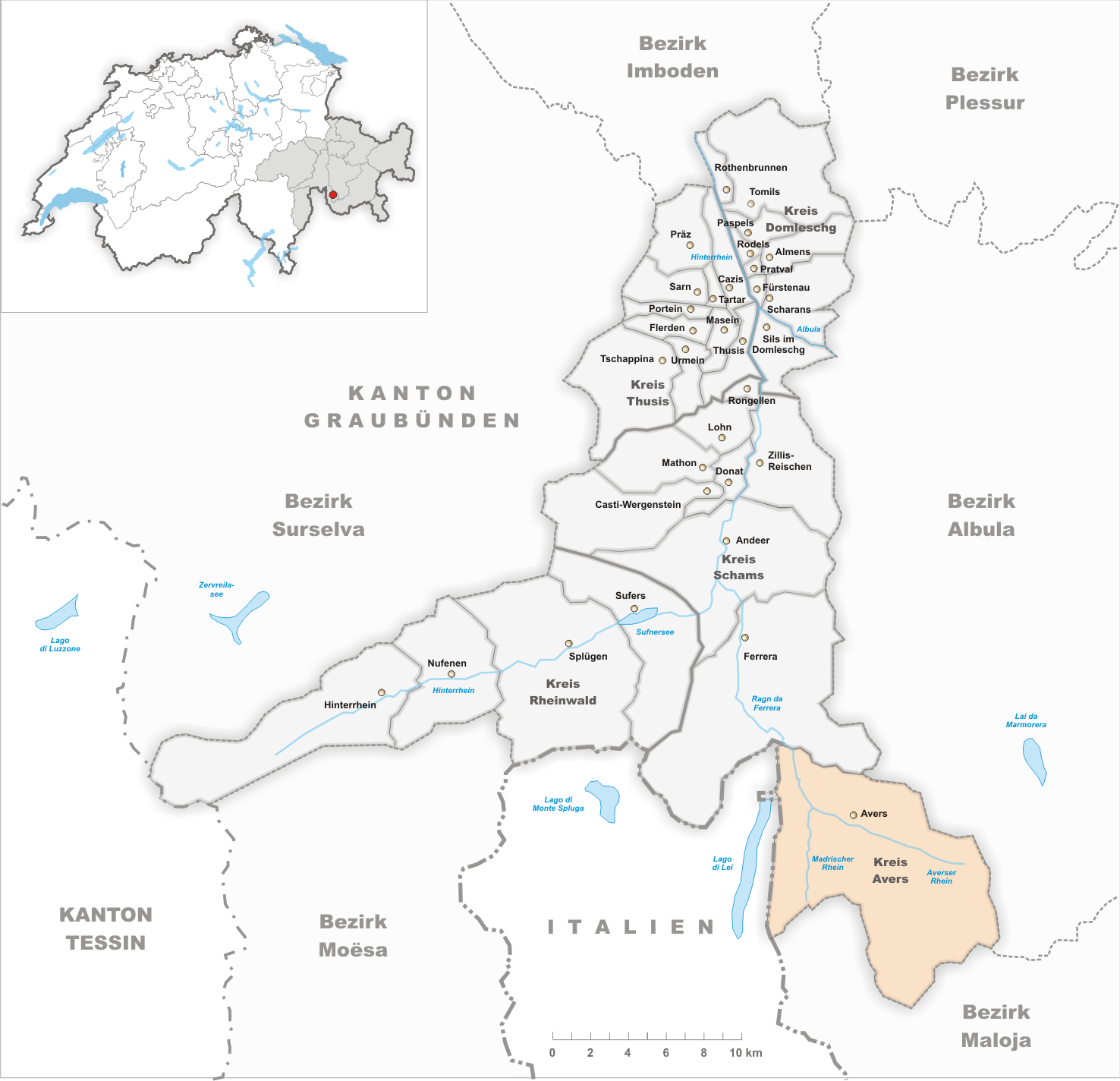
Avers

Avers (Romansh: Avras; Walser: Òòver(s), pronounced [ɔːfər(s)]) is a high Alpine valley region and a municipality in the Viamala Region in the Swiss canton of the Grisons. It includes Juf, the highest-altitude year-round settlement in Europe.

== History ==
Avers is first mentioned in 1292 as Anue or Avre. In 1354 it was mentioned as Auers.

== Geography ==
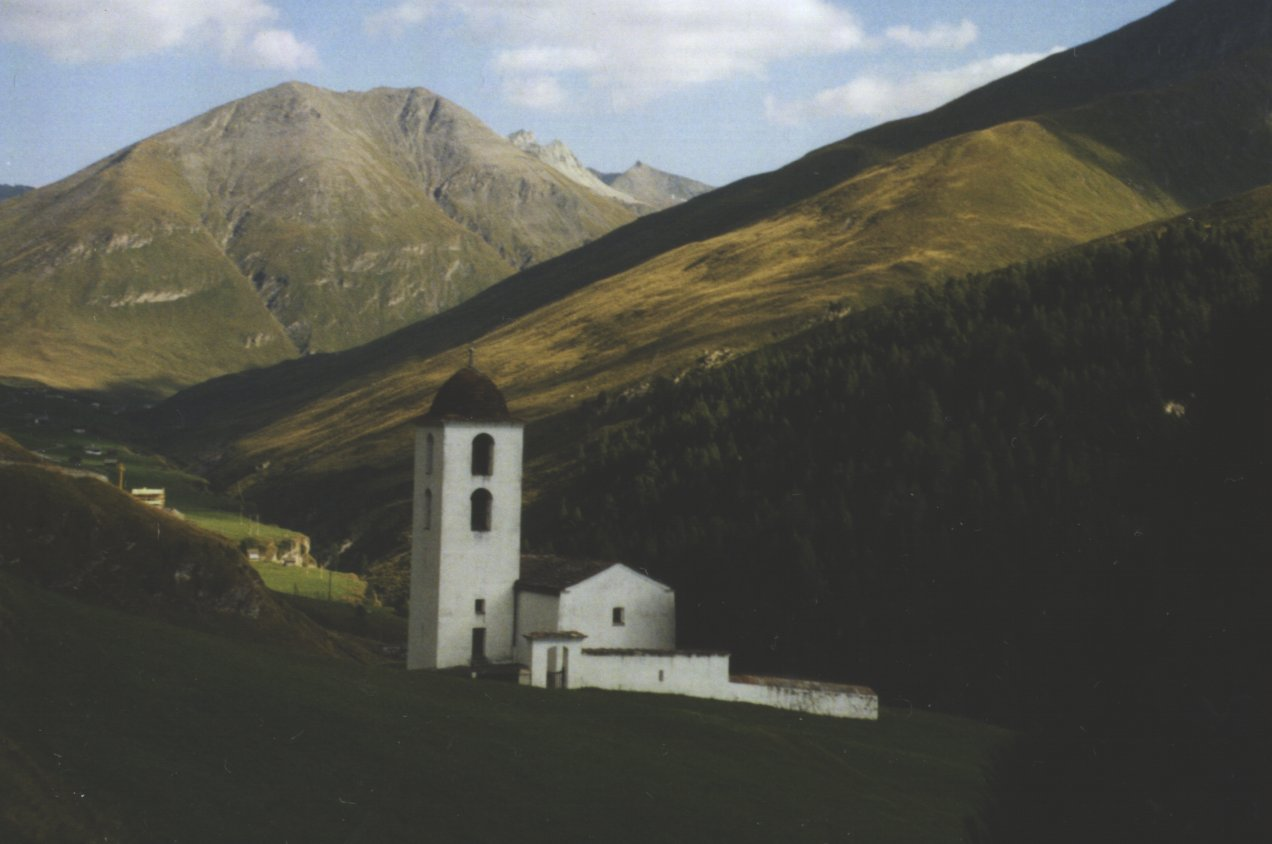
Church in Cresta, part of Avers

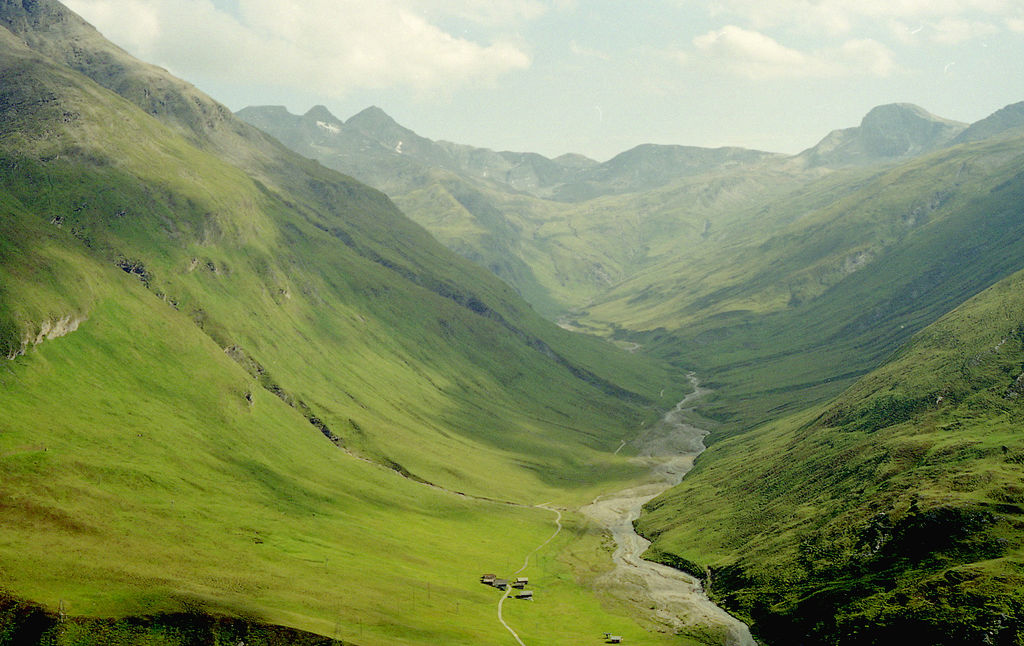
Avers valley

Avers has an area, as of 2006, of 93.1 km^{2} (35.9 sq mi). Of this area, 50% is used for agricultural purposes, while 5.5% is forested. Of the rest of the land, 0.5% is settled (buildings or roads) and the remainder (44%) is non-productive (rivers, glaciers or mountains).

The following villages are part of the municipality: Campsut (and Maxsut, 1,668 m (5,472 ft) ), Cröt (1,715 m (5,627 ft)), Cresta (1,960 m (6,430 ft)), Pürt (1,921 m (6,302 ft)), Am Bach (1,959 m (6,427 ft)), Juppa (2,004 m (6,575 ft)), Podestatsch Hus (2,046 m (6,713 ft)) and Juf (2,126 m (6,975 ft)).

Before 2017, the municipality was located in the Hinterrhein district and is the capital and only municipality in the Avers sub-district, after 2017 it was part of the Viamala Region. It includes the Jufer valley, the Averser branch of the Rhine as well as the side valleys of Madris and Bergalga.

== Demographics ==
Despite being surrounded by Romansh speaking areas and the Italian speaking side valley of Valle di Lei, the people here speak German due to the Walser immigrants that settled the higher and remote valleys in Grisons after migrating from the west. Their culture can be followed on a multi-day hike through all of the Canton of the Grisons, called the Walserweg.

Avers has a population (as of 31 December 2020) of 164. As of 2008, 4.1% of the population was made up of foreign nationals. Over the last 10 years the population has decreased at a rate of -9.1%.

As of 2000, the gender distribution of the population was 46.5% male and 53.5% female. The age distribution, as of 2000, in Avers is; 28 people or 17.5% of the population are between 0 and 9 years old. 7 people or 4.4% are 10 to 14, and 5 people or 3.1% are 15 to 19. Of the adult population, 8 people or 5.0% of the population are between 20 and 29 years old. 22 people or 13.8% are 30 to 39, 27 people or 16.9% are 40 to 49, and 15 people or 9.4% are 50 to 59. The senior population distribution is 18 people or 11.3% of the population are between 60 and 69 years old, 21 people or 13.1% are 70 to 79, there are 8 people or 5.0% who are 80 to 89, and there is 1 person or 0.6% who is 90 to 99.

In the 2007 federal election the most popular party was the SVP which received 70.2% of the vote. The next three most popular parties were the SPS (19%), the CVP (5.8%) and the FDP (4.7%).

The entire Swiss population is generally well educated. In Avers about 66.6% of the population (between age 25-64) have completed either non-mandatory upper secondary education or additional higher education (either university or a Fachhochschule).

Avers has an unemployment rate of 1.56%. As of 2005, there were 51 people employed in the primary economic sector and about 18 businesses involved in this sector. 11 people are employed in the secondary sector and there is 1 business in this sector. 31 people are employed in the tertiary sector, with 12 businesses in this sector.

The historical population is given in the following table:

year	population
1645	498
1850	293
1900	204
1950	167
1960	270
2000	160

== Languages ==
German is spoken by the vast majority of the population and is the only official language of the municipality. As of 2000 93.8% of the population speaks German, with Romansh being second most common (1.9%) and Italian being third (1.3%).

Languages in Avers
Language	Census of 1980		Census of 1990		Census of 2000	
Language	Number	Percentage	Number	Percentage	Number	Percentage
German	133	95.00%	124	96.88%	150	93.75%
Romansh	4	2.86%	2	1.56%	3	1.88%
Italian	3	2.14%	2	1.56%	2	1.25%
Population	140	100%	128	100%	160	100%

== Heritage sites of national significance ==
The Reformed Church in Avers is listed as a Swiss heritage sites of national significance.

== Houses ==
A custom in the Avers valley (found also in Bosco/Gurin, Ticino) was to build houses with a Seelabalga ("soul-beam"). This was a sliding wooden door covering a small round hole through the wall, which was opened to allow the soul of a deceased inhabitant to depart.

== Weather ==
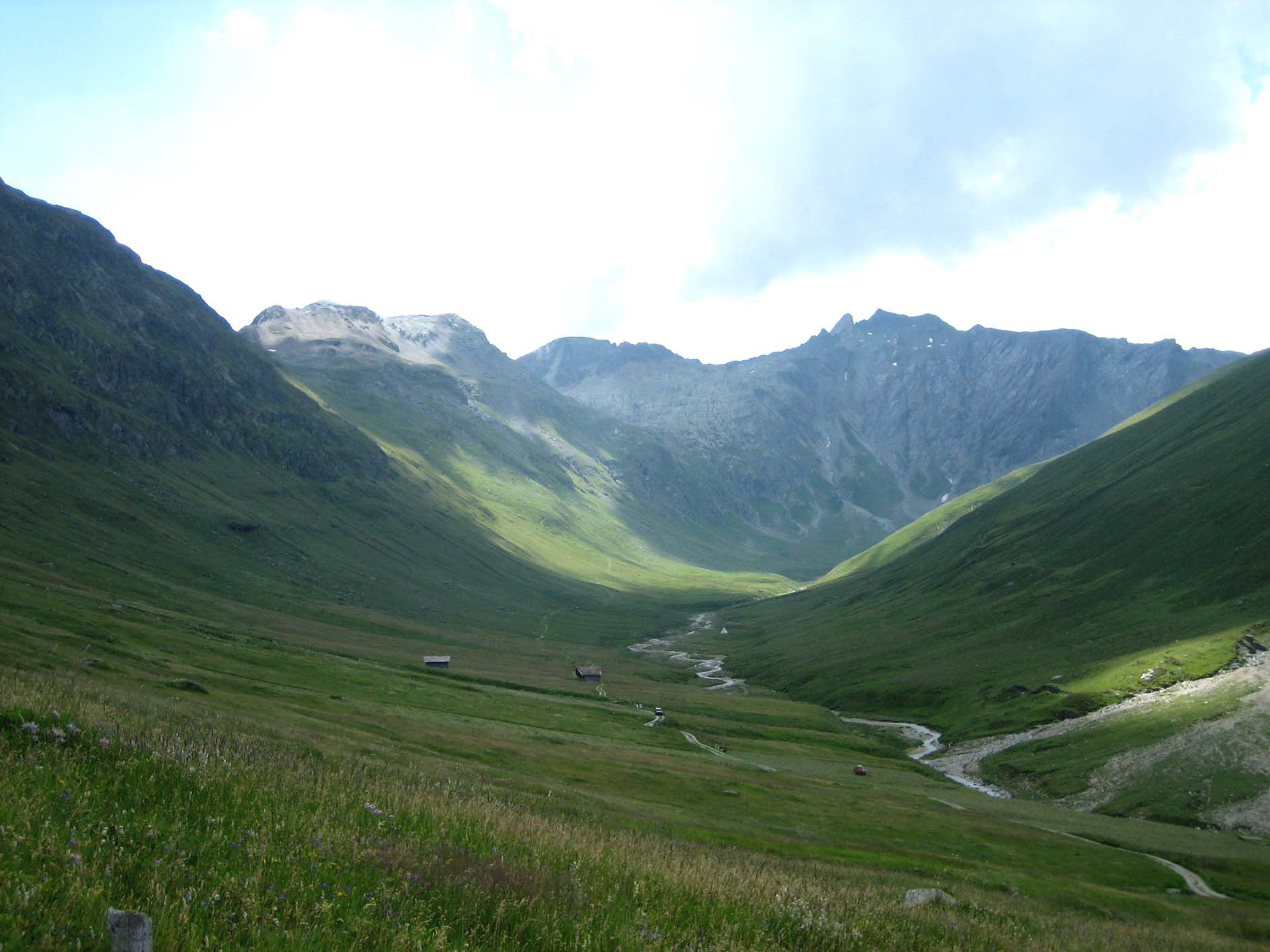
Avers valley near Juf

Avers has an average of 120.2 days of rain per year and on average receives 1,091 mm (43.0 in) of precipitation. The wettest month is August during which time Avers receives an average of 150 mm (5.9 in) of precipitation. During this month there is precipitation for an average of 12.4 days. The month with the most days of precipitation is May, with an average of 13.2, but with only 113 mm (4.4 in) of precipitation. The driest month of the year is February with an average of 42 mm (1.7 in) of precipitation over 12.4 days.
