= Herbert Y. Meltzer =

American scientist

Herbert Y. Meltzer is an American scientist and professor of psychiatry and behavioral sciences, pharmacology and physiology and director of the Translational Neuropharmacology Program at Northwestern University, best known for his research on the treatment of schizophrenia. He is the author of over 1,000 publications.

== Education ==
Herbert received his bachelor's degree from Cornell University, a master's in chemistry from Harvard University, and his MD from Yale University.

== Research career ==
During his research career, Meltzer discovered the effectiveness of clozapine in treating suicide attempts in patients with schizophrenia, which led to FDA approval of clozapine for treating suicide. He also discovered that clozapine can improve cognition.

Meltzer also worked on the research on pimavanserin which targets serotonin 5-HT2A receptor and is effective in treating psychosis in Parkinson's disease.

Herbert Y. Meltzer is currently leading the active clinical trial for JNJ-18038683.
