= Marina Wolf =

American neuroscientist

- Education: Yale University
- Scientific career
- Workplaces: Oregon Health & Science University; Sinai-Grace Hospital
- Thesis: Regulation of Dopamine Synthesis and Release in Striatal and Prefrontal Cortical Brain Slices (1986)

Marina Elizabeth Wolf is an American neuroscientist and Professor of Behavioral Neuroscience at Oregon Health & Science University. Previously she served as Professor and Chair of the Department of Neuroscience in the Chicago Medical School at Rosalind Franklin University of Medicine and Science. She has been a pioneer in studying the role of neuronal plasticity in drug addiction. Her laboratory is particularly interested in understanding why individuals recovering from substance use disorder remain vulnerable to drug craving and relapse even after long periods of abstinence.

== Education and career ==
Wolf was born in 1958 in Milwaukee, Wisconsin. She received her B.A. in biochemistry (with highest distinction) from Northwestern University. Here she received her introduction to neuroscience research working in the laboratory of Dr. Aryeh Routtenberg and later in the laboratory of Dr. David U'Prichard. Wolf earned her doctoral degree in Pharmacology in 1986 at Yale University under the mentorship of Dr. Robert Henry Roth. She was a postdoctoral fellow in the laboratory of Dr. Gregory Kapatos at the Center for Cell Biology at Sinai Hospital of Detroit, now Sinai-Grace Hospital, affiliated with Wayne State University. She was Assistant Professor of Psychiatry at Wayne State University before moving to the Chicago Medical School at Rosalind Franklin University of Medicine & Science in 1992 where she rose through the ranks, serving as Chair of Neuroscience from 2003 to 2018. She moved to OHSU in 2018.

== Research ==
As a Ph.D. student, postdoctoral fellow, and in the early years of her laboratory at Wayne State University, Dr. Wolf's work focused on fundamental properties of dopamine neurons and their relationship to antipsychotic drug action. At Wayne State, many of her colleagues studied the neurobiological basis of drug addiction. She therefore learned about prominent theories of addiction, all of which focused on events intrinsic to dopamine neurons. Excited by the groundbreaking work on glutamate receptors and LTP that was coming out at the time, she hypothesized in the late 1980s that the cascade leading to addiction might depend upon glutamate and synaptic plasticity. Her laboratory went on to use behavioral, biochemical, cell biological and electrophysiological approaches to demonstrate that glutamate synapses in the reward circuitry, especially the nucleus accumbens, undergo complex plasticity after exposure to drugs of abuse and that this plasticity in some cases plays a causal role in behavioral changes that model drug addiction. Her lab continues to characterize synaptic plasticity during abstinence from stimulants and opioids, and to test strategies to harness the understanding of drug-induced synaptic plasticity to develop therapeutic approaches to aid in recovery from substance use disorder.

== Awards and honors ==
Dr. Wolf's laboratory has been continuously supported by NIDA since 1992. She has previously been the recipient of a Merit Award from NIDA (R37) as well as a Senior Scientist Research and Mentorship Award (K05). She has served as a member of the NIDA Advisory Council, the NIH Council of Councils, and the NIDA Board of Scientific Counselors, the Council of the American College of Neuropsychopharmacology (ACNP), the Scientific Council of the Brain & Behavior Research Foundation, and the American Brain Coalition. She has been a member of many NIH study sections, and was Chair of MNPS from 2015 to 2017. She served as President of the ACNP in 2019. Dr. Wolf was elected a Fellow of the American Association for the Advancement of Science in 2017.

== Select publications ==
Wolf ME (1998) The role of excitatory amino acids in behavioral sensitization to psychomotor stimulants. Progress in Neurobiology 54:679-720. PMID 9560846

Wolf ME (2010) The Bermuda triangle of cocaine-induced neuroadaptations. TINS 33:391-398. PMC2935206

Wolf ME, Tseng KY (2012) Calcium-permeable AMPA receptors in the VTA and nucleus accumbens after cocaine exposure: when, how and why? Front Molecular Neurosci 5:72. PMC3384237

Wolf ME (2016) Synaptic mechanisms underlying persistent cocaine craving. Nat Rev Neurosci 17:351-365. PMC5466704
