= Patrizia Casaccia =

Italian neuroscientist

- Born: Giulianova, Italy
- Education: Catholic University of Rome, State University of New York (SUNY) Health and Science Center, Cornell Weill Medical Center
- Known for: Pathogenesis of demyelinating disorders, oligodendrocyte development
- Scientific career
- Fields: Neuroscience, neuroimmunology, genetics
- Workplaces: Icahn School of Medicine at Mount Sinai

Patrizia Casaccia is an Italian neuroscientist who is the Director of the Neuroscience Initiative of the Advanced Science Research Center at the CUNY Graduate Center, as well as a Professor of Neuroscience, Genetics & Genomics, and Neurology at the Icahn School of Medicine at Mount Sinai. Casaccia is a pioneer in the study of myelin. Her research focuses on understanding the neurobiological and neuroimmune mechanisms of multiple sclerosis and to translate findings into treatments. Casaccia co-founded the Center for Glial Biology at Mount Sinai and CUNY and is one of the Directors of the center.

== Early life and education ==
Casaccia was born in the coastal city of Giulianova in the province of Teramo, Italy. She grew up with her mother, father, and younger brother in Giulianova Lido, in Matteotti street. Her father was a physician in Giulianova and her brother grew up to pursue a career in medicine as well. Casaccia attended the Scientific High School of Giulianova, where she graduated with the M. Curie Diploma.

Casaccia attended medical school at the Catholic University of Rome, in the Policlinico A. Gemelli. She graduated with honors from medical school and began to pursue her residency in Neurology at Policlinico A. Gemelli in Rome. Two years into her residency, she was inspired by her Neurology professor to study in America to explore prion proteins and neurodegenerative disease.

She pursued her Ph.D. at the State University of New York Health and Science Center in Brooklyn. She first explored the role of the PrPSC protein in scrapie pathogenesis and also innovated new methods of gene transfer in organotypic hippocampal brain slices to explore kainate receptor biology and electrophysiology. Her doctoral thesis explored sleep dysregulation in patients with brain illness. She completed her PhD in Molecular Biology and Neurobiology, and stayed in New York City to pursue postdoctoral research at Weill Cornell Medical Center and at the Skirball Institute for Molecular Medicine.

Casaccia published a first-author Nature paper in 1996 showing that nerve growth factor highly specifically promotes the death of oligodendrocytes but not neurons, oligodendrocyte precursor cells, or astrocytes. She went on to explore oligodendrocyte progenitor cell (OPC) development, discovering that the cyclin-dependent kinase inhibitor p27 is critical to OPC development, such that differentiation in impaired and proliferation continues. In addition to her research on oligodendrocytes, Casaccia studied neurotrophins and their role in cell survival and differentiation in the central nervous system.

== Career and research ==
Casaccia was recruited to Robert Wood Johnson Medical School in 1999. Casaccia started as an assistant professor, and was promoted to associate professor while running a lab that explored the neurobiological basis of demyelinating disorders.

In 2008, Casaccia was recruited to the Icahn School of Medicine at Mount Sinai in New York City. She holds titles as the Professor of Neuroscience, Professor of Genetics and Genomic Science, and Professor of Neurology. In 2016, Casaccia was appointed to Director of the Neuroscience Initiative within the Advanced Science Research Center at the CUNY Graduate Center. At CUNY, Casaccia is Einstein Professor of Biology within the CUNY Graduate Center. In 2017, Casaccia and her colleague Anne Schaefer founded, and now co-direct, the Center for Glial Biology that spans the educational spaces of both Mount Sinai and CUNY.

Casaccia's research program focuses on translation in order to move basic science from her lab into therapeutic approaches in the clinic to help patients with multiple sclerosis (MS) and other neurodegenerative processes. One major area of research in Casaccia's lab is probing the molecular and genetic mechanisms of oligodendrocyte development, myelin formation, and myelin loss. Through analysis of epigenetic changes and transcriptional changes in glial cells, mostly oligodendrocytes, they are able to understand how certain stimuli or environmental influences may lead to disease phenotypes. While probing the basic biology of glial cells, Casaccia's lab also dissects the mechanisms of neurodegeneration in demyelinating disorders, such as MS. She looks at mitochondrial activity in neurons exposed to the cerebrospinal fluid (CSF) of patients with various neurodegenerative disorders, and she also analyses this CSF for insight into therapeutic targets and molecular pathways.

=== Oligodendrocyte and myelin development ===
Early into her professorship at Robert Wood Johnson Medical School, Casaccia returned to her postdoctoral findings, exploring the role of p27 in oligodendrocyte differentiation, to understand how myelin development occurs. She found that p27 regulates the differentiation of oligodendrocytes by modulating transcription of the gene for myelin basic protein. Casaccia found in 2002 that the delicate balance of proapoptotic and antiapoptotic molecules determine the propensity for cell death. The accumulation of proapoptotic molecules throughout development correlates with increased apoptosis, suggesting that manipulating the balance of these pro- and anti- apoptotic molecules could be useful as a strategy to prevent oligodendrocyte death.

Casaccia made her first discovery about the epigenetic regulation of oligodendrocytes in 2003, showing that their process outgrowth, which is critical to proper function and myelination in the brain, is regulated by chromatin modifiers. Casaccia found that male and female sex hormones have the capacity to regulate differentiation and maturation of oligodendrocytes. Casaccia and her colleagues later found a critical transcription factor, Yin Yang 1, in the differentiation of OPCs.

=== Therapeutic strategies targeting oligodendrocytes and myelin ===
Casaccia shifted her focus more towards translation after becoming a professor at Icahn School of Medicine. Focusing on demyelinating diseases, Casaccia found that inhibition of p53 leads to decreased oligodendrogliopathy, myelin preservation, and decreased microglial infiltration, serving as a potential future therapeutic target.

Casaccia contributes to the development of a new model of multiple sclerosis pathogenesis that takes into account genetic risk susceptibility and cell-specific epigenetic changes that occur in the immune system and the nervous system. Casaccia and her team turned to a mouse model of social isolation and found that it had impaired myelination. They were able to reverse the demyelination and enhance oligodendrocyte development through the administration of Clemastine, an antimuscarinic. Overall, they showed that enhancing or repairing myelination can act as a therapeutic strategy towards depressive-like social behaviors in mice. Casaccia has also begun to explore how altering the gut microbiota affects patients with relapsing MS. Casaccia and her team exposed rats to the cerebrospinal fluid of patients with multiple sclerosis. They found increased levels of ceramide in the CSF, and it led to oxidative stress and bioenergetic failure in the neurons of rats exposed to MS CSF.

=== Subventricular zone neurogenesis ===
Casaccia also explored the molecular and genetic mechanisms underlying neurogenesis. She has found that both p53 and p27, early found important in the regulation of oligodendrocyte development, modulate proliferation and self-renewal of adult subventricular zone cells.

== Awards and honors ==
- 2001 New Jersey Cancer Commission Award for Scientific Excellence
- 2005 Rutgers Women in Neuroscience Award
- 2007 Stem Cell Research Grants from the New Jersey Commission on Science and Technology (NJCST)

== Select publications ==
- S. Sauma, P. Casaccia. Gut-Brain Communication in Demyelinating Disorders. Current Opinion in Neurobiology, 2020, 62, 92–101. DOI: .
- K. Castro, P. Casaccia. Epigenetic modifications in brain and immune cells of multiple sclerosis patients. Mult Scler, 2018. DOI: 10.1177/1352458517737389.
- I. K. Sand, Y. Zhu, A. Ntranos, J.C. Clemente, E. Cekanaviciute, R. Brandstadter, E. Crabtree-Hartman, S. Singh, Y. Bencosme, J. Debelius, R. Knight, B.A.C. Cree, S.E. Baranzini, P. Casaccia. Disease-modifying therapies alter gut microbial composition in MS. Neurology – Neuroimmunology Neuroinflammation, 2018, 6, 1. DOI: 10.1212/nxi.0000000000000517
- Haines JD, Herbin O, de la Hera B, Vidaurre OG, Moy GA, Sun Q, Fung HY, Albrecht S, Alexandropoulos K, McCauley D, Chook YM, Kuhlmann T, Kidd GJ, Shacham S, Casaccia P. Nuclear export inhibitors avert progression in preclinical models of inflammatory demyelination. Nature neuroscience 2015 February;: pages 511–520.
- Huynh JL, Garg P, Thin TH, Yoo S, Dutta R, Trapp BD, Haroutunian V, Zhu J, Donovan MJ, Sharp AJ, Casaccia P. Epigenome-wide differences in pathology-free regions of multiple sclerosis-affected brains. Nature neuroscience 2014 January; 17(1): pages 121–130.
- Liu J, Dietz K, DeLoyht JM, Pedre X, Kelkar D, Kaur J, Vialou V, Lobo MK, Dietz DM, Nestler EJ, Dupree J, Casaccia P. Impaired adult myelination in the prefrontal cortex of socially isolated mice. Nature neuroscience 2012 December; 15(12): pages 1621–1623.
- Casaccia P. Anti-TANKyrase weapons promote myelination. Nature neuroscience 2011 August; 14(8): pages 945–947.
- He Y, Kim JY, Dupree J, Tewari A, Melendez-Vasquez C, Svaren J, Casaccia P. Yy1: a molecular link between neuregulin and transcriptional modulation of peripheral myelination. Nature Neurosci 2010 December;: pages 1472–1480.
- Kim JY, Shen S, Dietz K, He Y, Howell O, Reynolds R, Casaccia P. HDAC1 nuclear export induced by pathological conditions is essential for the onset of axonal damage. Nat Neurosci 2010 February; 13(2): pages 180–189.
- Shen S, Sandoval J, Swiss VA, Li J, Dupree J, Franklin RJ, Casaccia-Bonnefil P. Age-dependent epigenetic control of differentiation inhibitors is critical for remyelination efficiency (News and Views and Highlights in Nature Neuroscience Reviews). Nature Neurosci 2008 September;.
- He Y, Dupree J, Wang J, Sandoval J, Li J, Liu H, Shi Y, Nave KA, Casaccia-Bonnefil P. The transcription factor Yin Yang1 is essential for oligodendrocyte progenitor differentiation. Neuron 2007 July; 55(2): pages 217–230.
- Gil-Perotin S, Verdugo JM, Li J, Marin-Husstege M, Soriano-Navarro M, Zindy F, Roussel M, Casaccia-Bonnefil P. Loss of p53 induces changes in the behaviour of subventricular zone cells: implications for the genesis of glial tumors. J. Neurosci 2006 January; 26: pages 1107–1116.
- Liu A, Stadelman C, Mastronardi F, Moscarello M, Sobel A, Casaccia-Bonnefil P. Expression of stathmin, a developmentally controlled cytoskeleton regulating molecule, in demyelinating disorders. J. Neurosci 2005 January; 25: pages 737–747.
- Miskimins R, Srinivasan R, Marin-Husstege M, Miskimins WK, Casaccia-Bonnefil P. p27(Kip1) enhances myelin basic protein gene promoter activity. Journal of Neuroscience Research. 67: 100–5. PMID 11754085 DOI: 10.1002/jnr.10080
- Casaccia-Bonnefil P, Carter BD, Dobrowsky RT, Chao MV. Death of oligodendrocytes mediated by the interaction of nerve growth factor with its receptor p75. Nature. 383: pages 716–9. PMID 8878481 DOI: 10.1038/383716a0
- Casaccia-Bonnefil P, Benedikz E, Shen H, Stelzer A, Edelstein D, Geschwind M, Brownlee M, Federoff HJ, Bergold PJ. Localized gene transfer into organotypic hippocampal slice cultures and acute hippocampal slices. Journal of Neuroscience Methods. 50: pages 341–51. PMID 8152244 DOI: 10.1016/0165-0270(93)90040-X
- Casaccia-Bonnefil P, Kascsak RJ, Fersko R, Callahan S, Carp RI. Brain regional distribution of prion protein PrP27-30 in mice stereotaxically microinjected with different strains of scrapie. 1993. The Journal of Infectious Diseases. 167: pages 7–12. PMID 8093365
