= Neuropsychopharmacology =

Study of neural mechanisms by which drugs influence behavior

Neuropsychopharmacology, an interdisciplinary science related to psychopharmacology (study of effects of drugs on the mind) and fundamental neuroscience, is the study of the neural mechanisms that drugs act upon to influence behavior. It entails research of mechanisms of neuropathology, pharmacodynamics (drug action), psychiatric illness, and states of consciousness. These studies are instigated at the detailed level involving neurotransmission/receptor activity, bio-chemical processes, and neural circuitry. Neuropsychopharmacology supersedes psychopharmacology in the areas of "how" and "why", and additionally addresses other issues of brain function. Accordingly, the clinical aspect of the field includes psychiatric (psychoactive) as well as neurologic (non-psychoactive) pharmacology-based treatments. Developments in neuropsychopharmacology may directly impact the studies of anxiety disorders, affective disorders, psychotic disorders, degenerative disorders, eating behavior, and sleep behavior.

== History ==
Drugs such as opium, alcohol, and certain plants have been used for millennia by humans to ease suffering or change awareness, but until the modern scientific era knowledge of how the substances actually worked was quite limited, most pharmacological knowledge being more a series of observation than a coherent model. The first half of the 20th century saw psychology and psychiatry as largely phenomenological, in that behaviors or themes which were observed in patients could often be correlated to a limited variety of factors such as childhood experience, inherited tendencies, or injury to specific brain areas. Models of mental function and dysfunction were based on such observations. Indeed, the behavioral branch of psychology dispensed altogether with what actually happened inside the brain, regarding most mental dysfunction as what could be dubbed as "software" errors. In the same era, the nervous system was progressively being studied at the microscopic and chemical level, but there was virtually no mutual benefit with clinical fields—until several developments after World War II began to bring them together. Neuropsychopharmacology may be regarded to have begun in the earlier 1950s with the discovery of drugs such as MAO inhibitors, tricyclic antidepressants, thorazine and lithium which showed some clinical specificity for mental illnesses such as depression and schizophrenia. Until that time, treatments that actually targeted these complex illnesses were practically non-existent. The prominent methods which could directly affect brain circuitry and neurotransmitter levels were the prefrontal lobotomy, and electroconvulsive therapy, the latter of which was conducted without muscle relaxants and both of which often caused the patient great physical and psychological injury.

The field now known as neuropsychopharmacology has resulted from the growth and extension of many previously isolated fields which have met at the core of psychiatric medicine, and engages a broad range of professionals from psychiatrists to researchers in genetics and chemistry. The use of the term has gained popularity since 1990 with the founding of several journals and institutions such as the Hungarian College of Neuropsychopharmacology. This rapidly maturing field shows some degree of flux, as research hypotheses are often restructured based on new information.

== Overview ==
An implicit premise in neuropsychopharmacology with regard to the psychological aspects is that all states of mind, including both normal and drug-induced altered states, and diseases involving mental or cognitive dysfunction, have a neurochemical basis at the fundamental level, and certain circuit pathways in the central nervous system at a higher level. (See also: Neuron doctrine) Thus the understanding of nerve cells or neurons in the brain is central to understanding the mind. It is reasoned that the mechanisms involved can be elucidated through modern clinical and research methods such as genetic manipulation in animal subjects, imaging techniques such as functional magnetic resonance imaging (fMRI), and in vitro studies using selective binding agents on live tissue cultures. These allow neural activity to be monitored and measured in response to a variety of test conditions. Other important observational tools include radiological imaging such as positron emission tomography (PET) and single-photon emission computed tomography (SPECT). These imaging techniques are extremely sensitive and can image tiny molecular concentrations on the order of 10^{−10} M such as found with extrastriatal D_{1} receptor for dopamine.

One of the ultimate goals is to devise and develop prescriptions of treatment for a variety of neuropathological conditions and psychiatric disorders. More profoundly, though, the knowledge gained may provide insight into the very nature of human thought, mental abilities like learning and memory, and perhaps consciousness itself. A direct product of neuropsychopharmacological research is the knowledge base required to develop drugs which act on very specific receptors within a neurotransmitter system. These "hyperselective-action" drugs would allow the direct targeting of specific sites of relevant neural activity, thereby maximizing the efficacy (or technically the potency) of the drug within the clinical target and minimizing adverse effects. However, there are some cases when some degree of pharmacological promiscuity is tolerable and even desirable, producing more desirable results than a more selective agent would. An example of this is Vortioxetine, a drug which is not particularly selective as a serotonin reuptake inhibitor, having a significant degree of serotonin modulatory activity, but which has demonstrated reduced discontinuation symptoms (and reduced likelihood of relapse) and greatly reduced incidence of sexual dysfunction, without loss in antidepressant efficacy.

The groundwork is currently being paved for the next generation of pharmacological treatments, which will improve quality of life with increasing efficiency. For example, contrary to previous thought, it is now known that the adult brain does to some extent grow new neurons—the study of which, in addition to neurotrophic factors, may hold hope for neurodegenerative diseases like Alzheimer's, Parkinson's, ALS, and types of chorea. All of the proteins involved in neurotransmission are a small fraction of the more than 100,000 proteins in the brain. Thus there are many proteins which are not even in the direct path of signal transduction, any of which may still be a target for specific therapy. At present, novel pharmacological approaches to diseases or conditions are reported at a rate of almost one per week.

== Neurotransmission ==
So far as we know, everything we perceive, feel, think, know, and do are a result of neurons firing and resetting. When a cell in the brain fires, small chemical and electrical swings called the action potential may affect the firing of as many as a thousand other neurons in a process called neurotransmission. In this way signals are generated and carried through networks of neurons, the bulk electrical effect of which can be measured directly on the scalp by an EEG device.

By the last decade of the 20th century, the essential knowledge of all the central features of neurotransmission had been gained. These features are:

- The synthesis and storage of neurotransmitter substances,
- The transport of synaptic vesicles and subsequent release into the synapse,
- Receptor activation and cascade function,
- Transport mechanisms (reuptake) and/or enzyme degradation

The more recent advances involve understanding at the organic molecular level; biochemical action of the endogenous ligands, enzymes, receptor proteins, etc. The critical changes affecting cell firing occur when the signalling neurotransmitters from one neuron, acting as ligands, bind to receptors of another neuron. Many neurotransmitter systems and receptors are well known, and research continues toward the identification and characterization of a large number of very specific subtypes of receptors. For the six more important neurotransmitters Glu, GABA, Ach, NE, DA, and 5HT (listed at neurotransmitter) there are at least 29 major subtypes of receptor. Further "sub-subtypes" exist together with variants, totalling in the hundreds for just these 6 transmitters. - (see serotonin receptor for example.) It is often found that receptor subtypes have differentiated function, which in principle opens up the possibility of refined intentional control over brain function.

It has previously been known that ultimate control over the membrane voltage or potential of a nerve cell, and thus the firing of the cell, resides with the transmembrane ion channels which control the membrane currents via the ions K^{+}, Na^{+}, and Ca^{++}, and of lesser importance Mg^{++} and Cl^{−}. The concentration differences between the inside and outside of the cell determine the membrane voltage.

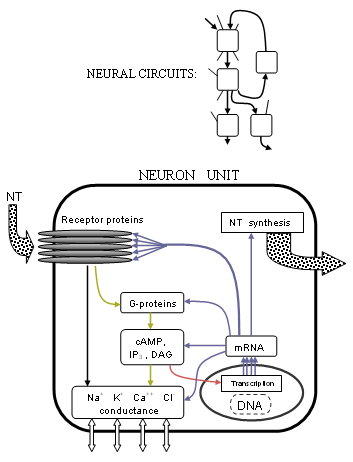
Abstract simplified diagram showing overlap between neurotransmission and metabolic activity. Neurotransmitters bind to receptors which cause changes to ion channels (black, yellow), metabotropic receptors also affect DNA transcription (red), transcription is responsible for all cell proteins including enzymes which manufacture neurotransmitters (blue).

Precisely how these currents are controlled has become much clearer with the advances in receptor structure and G-protein coupled processes. Many receptors are found to be pentameric clusters of five transmembrane proteins (not necessarily the same) or receptor subunits, each a chain of many amino acids. Transmitters typically bind at the junction between two of these proteins, on the parts that protrude from the cell membrane. If the receptor is of the ionotropic type, a central pore or channel in the middle of the proteins will be mechanically moved to allow certain ions to flow through, thus altering the ion concentration difference. If the receptor is of the metabotropic type, G-proteins will cause metabolism inside the cell that may eventually change other ion channels. Researchers are better understanding precisely how these changes occur based on the protein structure shapes and chemical properties.

The scope of this activity has been stretched even further to the very blueprint of life since the clarification of the mechanism underlying gene transcription. The synthesis of cellular proteins from nuclear DNA has the same fundamental machinery for all cells; the exploration of which now has a firm basis thanks to the Human Genome Project which has enumerated the entire human DNA sequence, although many of the estimated 35,000 genes remain to be identified. The complete neurotransmission process extends to the genetic level. Gene expression determines protein structures through type II RNA polymerase. So enzymes which synthesize or breakdown neurotransmitters, receptors, and ion channels are each made from mRNA via the DNA transcription of their respective gene or genes. But neurotransmission, in addition to controlling ion channels either directly or otherwise through metabotropic processes, also actually modulates gene expression. This is most prominently achieved through modification of the transcription initiation process by a variety of transcription factors produced from receptor activity.

Aside from the important pharmacological possibilities of gene expression pathways, the correspondence of a gene with its protein allows the important analytical tool of gene knockout. Living specimens can be created using homolog recombination in which a specific gene cannot be expressed. The organism will then be deficient in the associated protein which may be a specific receptor. This method avoids chemical blockade which can produce confusing or ambiguous secondary effects so that the effects of a lack of receptor can be studied in a purer sense.

== Drugs ==
The inception of many classes of drugs is in principle straightforward: any chemical that can enhance or diminish the action of a target protein could be investigated further for such use. The trick is to find such a chemical that is receptor-specific (cf. "dirty drug") and safe to consume. The 2005 Physicians' Desk Reference lists twice the number of prescription drugs as the 1990 version. Many people by now are familiar with "selective serotonin reuptake inhibitors", or SSRIs which exemplify modern pharmaceuticals. These SSRI antidepressant drugs, such as Paxil and Prozac, selectively and therefore primarily inhibit the transport of serotonin which prolongs the activity in the synapse. There are numerous categories of selective drugs, and transport blockage is only one mode of action. The FDA has approved drugs which selectively act on each of the major neurotransmitters such as NE reuptake inhibitor antidepressants, DA blocker anti-psychotics, and GABA agonist tranquilizers (benzodiazepines).

New endogenous chemicals are continually identified. Specific receptors have been found for the drugs THC (cannabis) and GHB, with endogenous transmitters anandamide and GHB. Another recent major discovery occurred in 1999 when orexin, or hypocretin, was found to have a role in arousal, since the lack of orexin receptors mirrors the condition of narcolepsy. Orexin agonism may explain the antinarcoleptic action of the drug modafinil which was already being used only a year prior. However, evidence also suggests modafinil acts via inhibiting the function of the dopamine transporter (DAT), since dopamine can influence orexin neurons (orexin neurons are sensitive to catecholamine inputs) and this may explain the indirect effect of modafinil on norepinephrine levels, since orexin neurons themselves can regulate norepinephrine neurotransmission. In this sense, manipulation of dopaminergic circuits (mesocortic and mesolimbic pathways) is currently the most potent method of producing wakefulness relative to manipulation of other neurotransmitters/receptors. However, unlike classical psychostimulants such as amphetamine and methylphenidate, modafinil inhibits the DAT in a distinct manner that has yet to be clarified, thus producing comparatively less intense/consistent rewarding effects while also reducing the effects of amphetamine, an action shared by DAT inhibitors such as methylphenidate. In addition, dopaminergic drugs can also work via the nigrostriatal pathway, which plays a major role in motor control, an ability that is often impaired in narcoleptic patients.

The next step, which major pharmaceutical companies are currently working hard to develop, are receptor subtype-specific drugs and other specific agents. An example is the push for better anti-anxiety agents (anxiolytics) based on GABA_{A}(α2) agonists, CRF_{1} antagonists, and 5HT_{2c} antagonists. Another is the proposal of new routes of exploration for antipsychotics such as glycine reuptake inhibitors. Although the capabilities exist for receptor-specific drugs, a shortcoming of drug therapy is the lack of ability to provide anatomical specificity. By altering receptor function in one part of the brain, abnormal activity can be induced in other parts of the brain due to the same type of receptor changes. A common example is the effect of D_{2} altering drugs (neuroleptics) which can help schizophrenia, but cause a variety of dyskinesias by their action on motor cortex.

Modern studies are revealing details of mechanisms of damage to the nervous system such as apoptosis (programmed cell death) and free-radical disruption. Phencyclidine has been found to cause cell death in striatopallidal cells and abnormal vacuolization in hippocampal and other neurons. The hallucinogen persisting perception disorder (HPPD), also known as post-psychedelic perception disorder, has been observed in patients as long as 26 years after LSD use. The plausible cause of HPPD is damage to the inhibitory GABA circuit in the visual pathway (GABA agonists such as midazolam can decrease some effects of LSD intoxication). The damage may be the result of an excitotoxic response of 5HT_{2} interneurons. [Note: the vast majority of LSD users do not experience HPPD. Its manifestation may be equally dependent on individual brain chemistry as on the drug use itself.] As for MDMA, aside from persistent losses of 5HT and SERT, long-lasting reduction of serotonergic axons and terminals is found from short-term use, and regrowth may be of compromised function.

== Neural circuits ==
Many functions of the brain are somewhat localized to associated areas like motor and speech ability. Functional associations of brain anatomy are now being complemented with clinical, behavioral, and genetic correlates of receptor action, completing the knowledge of neural signalling (see also: Human Cognome Project). The signal paths of neurons are hyperorganized beyond the cellular scale into often complex neural circuit pathways. Knowledge of these pathways is perhaps the easiest to interpret, being most recognizable from a systems analysis point of view, as may be seen in the following abstracts.

Almost all drugs with a known potential for abuse have been found to modulate activity (directly or indirectly) in the mesolimbic dopamine system, which includes and connects the ventral tegmental area in the midbrain to the hippocampus, medial prefrontal cortex, and amygdala in the forebrain; as well as the nucleus accumbens in the ventral striatum of the basal ganglia. In particular, the nucleus accumbens (NAc) plays an important role in integrating experiential memory from the hippocampus, emotion from the amygdala, and contextual information from the PFC to help associate particular stimuli or behaviors with feelings of pleasure and reward; continuous activation of this reward indicator system by an addictive drug can also cause previously neutral stimuli to be encoded as cues that the brain is about to receive a reward. This happens via the selective release of dopamine, a neurotransmitter responsible for feelings of euphoria and pleasure. The use of dopaminergic drugs alters the amount of dopamine released throughout the mesolimbic system, and regular or excessive use of the drug can result in a long-term downregulation of dopamine signaling, even after an individual stops ingesting the drug. This can lead the individual to engage in mild to extreme drug-seeking behaviors as the brain begins to regularly expect the increased presence of dopamine and the accompanying feelings of euphoria, but how problematic this is depends highly on the drug and the situation.

Significant progress has been made on central mechanisms of certain hallucinogenic drugs. It is at this point known with relative certainty that the primary shared effects of a broad pharmacological group of hallucinogens, sometimes called the "classical psychedelics", can be attributed largely to agonism of serotonin receptors. The 5HT_{2A} receptor, which seems to be the most critical receptor for psychedelic activity, and the 5HT_{2C} receptor, which is a significant target of most psychedelics but which has no clear role in hallucinogenesis, are involved by releasing glutamate in the frontal cortex, while simultaneously in the locus coeruleus sensory information is promoted and spontaneous activity decreases. 5HT_{2A} activity has a net pro-dopaminergic effect, whereas 5HT_{2C} receptor agonism has an inhibitory effect on dopaminergic activity, particularly in the prefrontal cortex. One hypothesis suggests that in the frontal cortex, 5HT_{2A} promotes late asynchronous excitatory postsynaptic potentials, a process antagonized by serotonin itself through 5HT_{1} receptors, which may explain why SSRIs and other serotonin-affecting drugs do not normally cause a patient to hallucinate. However, the fact that many classical psychedelics do in fact have significant affinity for 5HT_{1} receptors throws this claim into question. The head twitch response, a test used for assessing classical psychedelic activity in rodents, is produced by serotonin itself only in the presence of beta-Arrestins, but is triggered by classical psychedelics independent of beta-Arrestin recruitment. This may better explain the difference between the pharmacology of serotonergic neurotransmission (even if promoted by drugs such as SSRIs) and that of classical psychedelics. Newer findings, however, indicate that binding to the 5HT_{2A}-mGlu2 heterodimer is also necessary for classical psychedelic activity. This, too, may be relevant to the pharmacological differences between the two. While early in the history of psychedelic drug research it was assumed that these hallucinations were comparable to those produced by psychosis and thus that classical psychedelics could serve as a model of psychosis, modern neuropsychopharmacological knowledge of psychosis has progressed significantly since then, and we now know that psychosis shows little similarity to the effects of classical psychedelics in mechanism, reported experience or most other respects aside from the surface similarity of "hallucination"..

Diagram of neural circuit which regulates melatonin production via actual circuit pathways. Green light in the eye inhibits pineal production of melatonin (Inhibitory connections shown in red). Also shown:reaction sequence for melatonin synthesis.

Circadian rhythm, or sleep/wake cycling, is centered in the suprachiasmatic nucleus (SCN) within the hypothalamus, and is marked by melatonin levels 2000–4,000% higher during sleep than in the day. A circuit is known to start with melanopsin cells in the eye which stimulate the SCN through glutamate neurons of the hypothalamic tract. GABAergic neurons from the SCN inhibit the paraventricular nucleus, which signals the superior cervical ganglion (SCG) through sympathetic fibers. The output of the SCG, stimulates NE receptors (β) in the pineal gland which produces N-acetyltransferase, causing production of melatonin from serotonin. Inhibitory melatonin receptors in the SCN then provide a positive feedback pathway. Therefore, light inhibits the production of melatonin which "entrains" the 24-hour cycle of SCN activity. The SCN also receives signals from other parts of the brain, and its (approximately) 24-hour cycle does not only depend on light patterns. In fact, sectioned tissue from the SCN will exhibit daily cycle in vitro for many days. Additionally, (not shown in diagram), the basal nucleus provides GABA-ergic inhibitory input to the pre-optic anterior hypothalamus (PAH). When adenosine builds up from the metabolism of ATP throughout the day, it binds to adenosine receptors, inhibiting the basal nucleus. The PAH is then activated, generating slow-wave sleep activity. Caffeine is known to block adenosine receptors, thereby inhibiting sleep among other things.

== Research ==
Research in the field of neuropsychopharmacology encompasses a wide range of objectives. These might include the study of a new chemical compound for potentially beneficial cognitive or behavioral effects, or the study of an old chemical compound in order to better understand its mechanism of action at the cell and neural circuit levels. For example, the addictive stimulant drug cocaine has long been known to act upon the reward system in the brain, increasing dopamine and norepinephrine levels and inducing euphoria for a short time. More recently published studies however have gone deeper than the circuit level and found that a particular G-protein coupled receptor complex called A2AR-D2R-Sigma1R is formed in the NAc following cocaine usage; this complex reduces D2R signaling in the mesolimbic pathway and may be a contributing factor to cocaine addiction. Other cutting-edge studies have focused on genetics to identify specific biomarkers that may predict an individual's specific reactions or degree of response to a drug or their tendency to develop addictions in the future. These findings are important because they provide detailed insight into the neural circuitry involved in drug use and help refine old as well as develop new treatment methods for disorders or addictions. Different treatment-related studies are investigating the potential role of peptide nucleic acids in treating Parkinson's disease and schizophrenia while still others are attempting to establish previously unknown neural correlates underlying certain phenomena.

Research in neuropsychopharmacology comes from a wide range of activities in neuroscience and clinical research. This has motivated organizations such as the American College of Neuropsychopharmacology (ACNP), the European College of Neuropsychopharmacology (ECNP), and the Collegium Internationale Neuro-psychopharmacologicum (CINP) to be established as a measure of focus. The ECNP publishes European Neuropsychopharmacology, and as part of the Reed Elsevier Group, the ACNP publishes the journal Neuropsychopharmacology, and the CINP publishes the journal International Journal of Neuropsychopharmacology with Cambridge University Press. In 2002, a recent comprehensive collected work of the ACNP, "Neuropsychopharmacology: The Fifth Generation of Progress" was compiled. It is one measure of the state of knowledge in 2002, and might be said to represent a landmark in the century-long goal to establish the basic neurobiological principles which govern the actions of the brain.

Many other journals exist which contain relevant information such as Neuroscience. Some of them are listed at Brown University Library.

== See also ==
- Pharmacology
- Neuropharmacology
- Psychopharmacology
- Psychoactive drug
