= Casaccia, Graubünden =

Village in Graubünden, Switzerland

Coordinates: 46°23′28″N 9°39′58″E

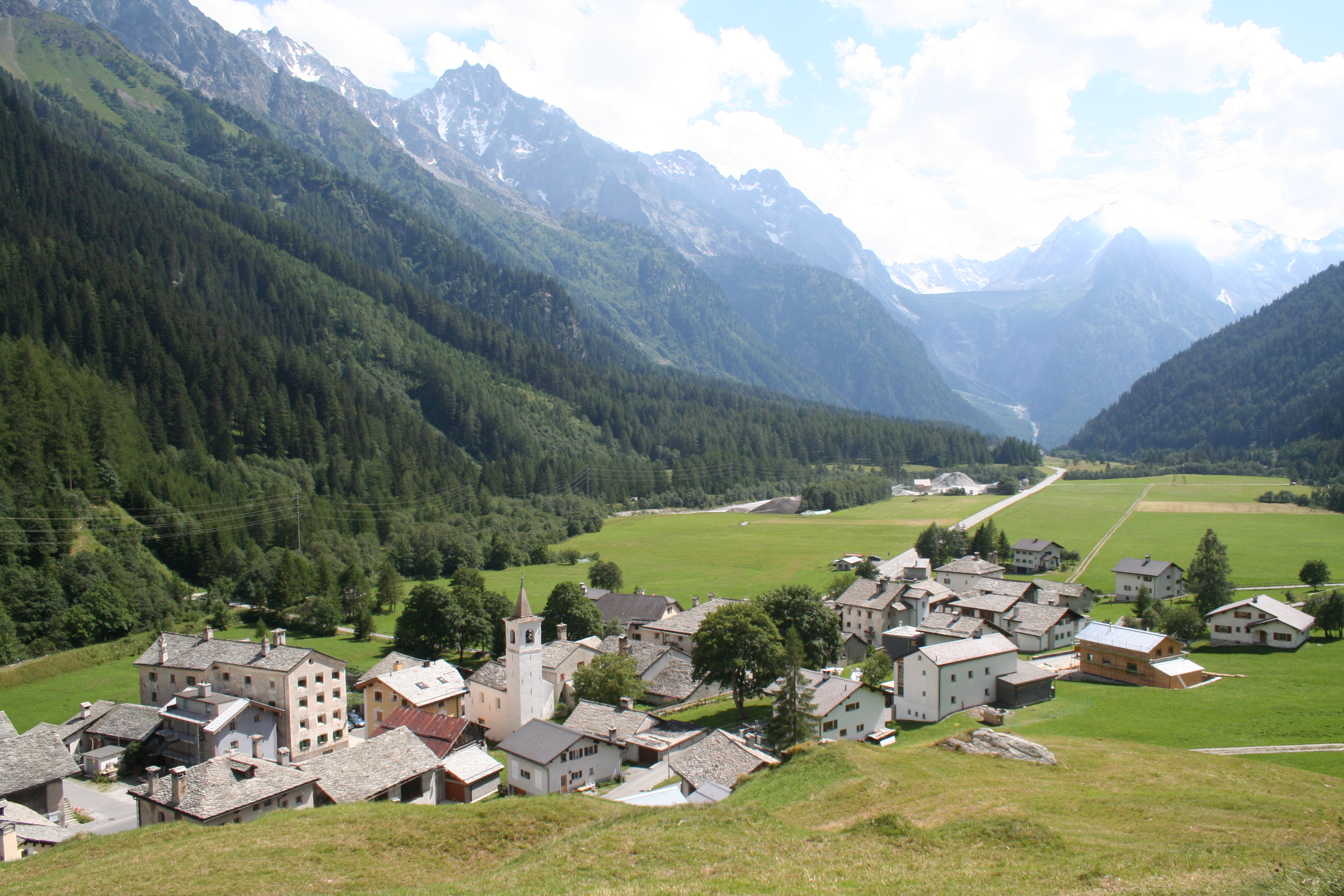
View of Casaccia

Casaccia is a village located in the Val Bregaglia, in the Swiss canton of Graubünden. It lies at an altitude of 1,458 metres above sea level, at the southern foot of Piz Lunghin. The village belongs to the municipality of Bregaglia.
