= C3H6N2O2 =

The molecular formula C_{3}H_{6}N_{2}O_{2} may refer to following compounds:

- Cycloserine
- Malonamide
