= C4H8N2O2 =

The molecular formula C_{4}H_{8}N_{2}O_{2} (molar mass: 116.12 g/mol) may refer to:

- N-Acetylglycinamide
- Dimethylglyoxime
- Dihydromuscimol
- HA-966
- N-Nitrosomorpholine
