= BioLineRx =

Israeli drug development company

BioLineRx Ltd.
- Type: Public
- Traded as: Nasdaq: BLRX; TASE: BLRX
- Industry: Biotechnology
- Founded: 2003; 23 years ago
- Headquarters: Modiin, Israel
- Key people: Philip Serlin (CEO)
- Services: Drug development
- Owners: Novartis (12.8%, 2014)
- Website: www.biolinerx.com

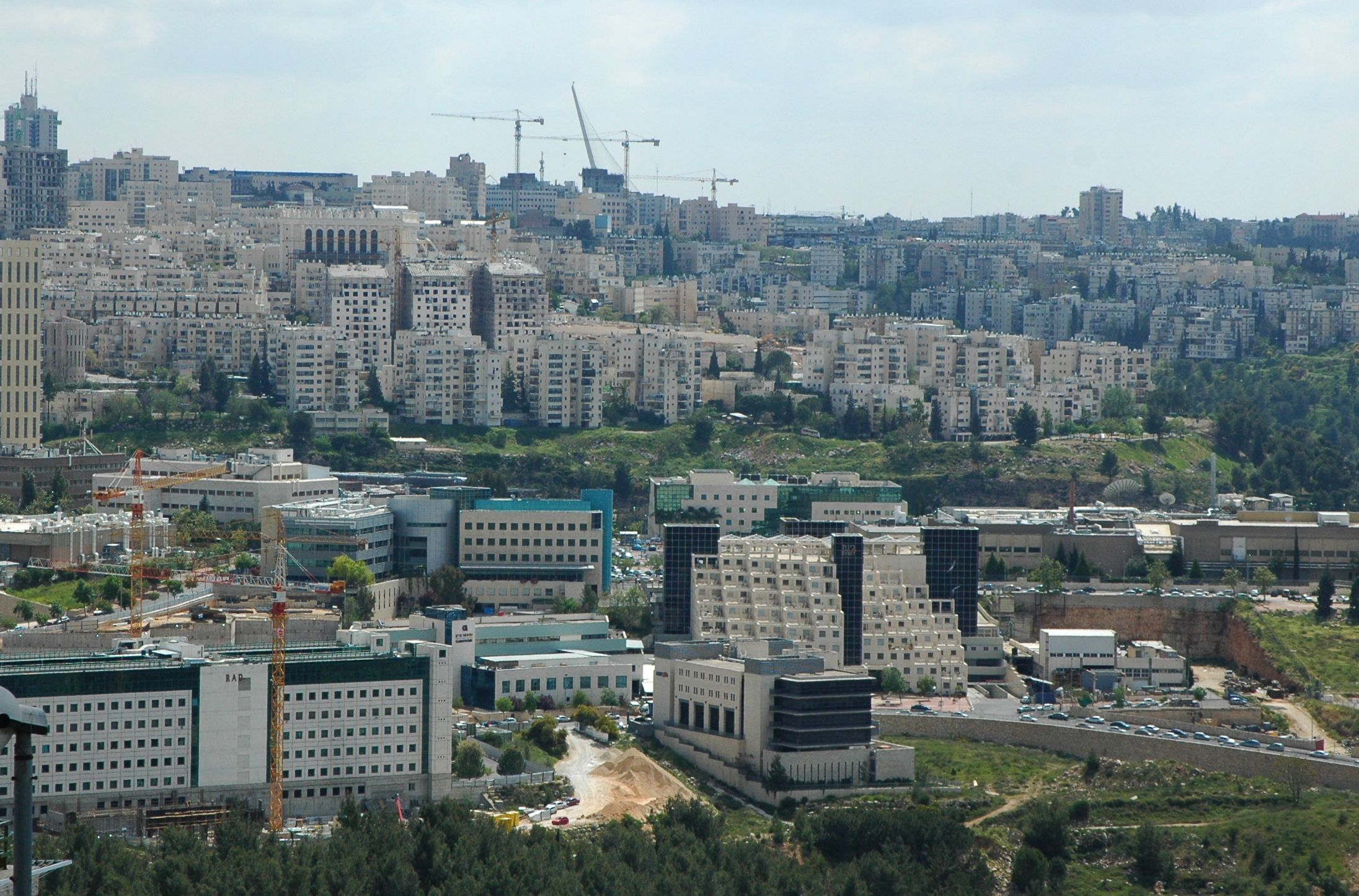
BioLineRX office in Har Hotzvim Technology Park, Jerusalem

BioLineRx Ltd. (Hebrew: ביוליין אר אקס), or BioLine, is a publicly traded drug development company. Headquartered in Israel, its shares are traded on the NASDAQ Capital Market and on the Tel Aviv Stock Exchange.

== Corporate history ==
The firm was established in 2003 as a joint venture of Teva, Hadasit Bio-Holdings, the Jerusalem Development Authority, Yehuda Zisapel, and other investors. It executed an initial public offering on the Tel Aviv Stock Exchange in February 2007, raising 211 million NIS ($50 million) – the TASE's largest biotech IPO until that time. In July 2011 BioLine's ADRs began trading on the NASDAQ Capital Market. In January 2012, the firm announced a deal with Genoscience, a French pharmaceutical company to jointly develop and market the BL-8020 compound, as a treatment for Hepatitis C. At the end of 2014, Novartis acquired a 12.8% stake in the company as a strategic move to gain access to Israeli-sourced drug candidates.

=== Management ===
Morris Laster, (M.D.) an alumnus of. Downstate Medical Center, was CEO of BioLineRx until 2009. He was replaced by Kinneret Savitsky, alumnus of Tel Aviv University early in 2010. Savitsky was replaced as CEO by BioLine COO Philip Serlin on October 10, 2016.

== Operations ==
Previous logo

BioLineRx is a drug development company When promising compounds are discovered, the firm leads them through preclinical trials and engages other companies to further develop them into commercializable drugs. The company entered into its first major commercialization agreement in 2009 when it partnered with Ikaria Holdings Inc. to develop its BL-1040 compound. In 2010, BioLine entered into a commercialization agreement with Cypress Bioscience Inc. for development of its BL-1020 compound. The agreement with Cypress was canceled in 2011 when the company was taken over by Ramius LLC.

=== Pipeline ===
Below is a partial list of drug compounds in various stages of development by BioLineRx. Unless indicated otherwise, they have not obtained regulatory approval in relation to the diseases cited.

- BL-1010 – orally available neuropathic pain
- BL-1020 – orally available GABA-enhanced antipsychotic for treatment of schizophrenia
- BL-1021 – orally available small molecule for treatment of neuropathic pain
- BL-1040 – liquid polymer injected into patients with acute myocardial infarction, invented by Smadar Cohen of Ben-Gurion University
- BL-1230 - a selective cannabinoid receptor type 2 (CB2R) agonist for Dry Eye Syndrome (DES)
- BL-5010 – cream treatment for seborrheic keratosis skin lesions
- BL-7040 – orally available anti-inflammatory drug invented by Hermona Soreq of the Hebrew University of Jerusalem
- BL-8020 – orally administered treatment for Hepatitis C, developed by Philippe Halfon, co-founder and President of Genoscience.
- BL-8030 – second-generation NS3 protease inhibitor for oral treatment of Hepatitis C, invented by Philippe Halfon

== See also ==
- TA BlueTech Index
- List of Israeli companies quoted on the Nasdaq
