= List of investigational bipolar disorder drugs =

Investigational substance-related disorder drugs

This is a list of investigational bipolar disorder drugs, or drugs that are currently under development for clinical use for the treatment of bipolar disorder (manic depression) and related conditions but are not yet approved. Bipolar disorder and related conditions include bipolar I disorder, bipolar II disorder, cyclothymia, manic episodes, bipolar depression, and schizoaffective disorder (bipolar/manic and mixed types).

Chemical/generic names are listed first, with developmental code names, synonyms, and brand names in parentheses. The format of list items is "Name (Synonyms) – Mechanism of Action – Indication [Reference]".

This list was last comprehensively updated in May 2026. It is likely to become outdated with time.

== Under development ==
=== Preregistration ===
- Lurasidone (DSP-1349M; Latuda; SM-13496; SMP-13496) – atypical antipsychotic (non-selective monoamine receptor modulator) – bipolar disorders

=== Phase 3 ===
- ALM-008 – undefined mechanism of action (mood stabilizer) – bipolar disorders
- Azetukalner (1OP-2198; encukalner; VRX-621698; XEN-1101; XPF-008) – K_{v}7.2 and K_{v}7.3 potassium channel opener – bipolar depression
- Brenipatide (LY-3537031) – glucagon-like peptide-1 (GLP-1) receptor agonist and gastric inhibitory polypeptide (GIP) receptor agonist – bipolar disorders
- Brexpiprazole (Lu-AF41156; OPC-34712; OPDC-34712; Rexulti; Rxulti) – atypical antipsychotic (non-selective monoamine receptor modulator) – bipolar disorders
- Cycloserine/lurasidone (Cyclurad; D-cycloserine/lurasidone; lurasidone/cycloserine; NRX-101) – combination of cycloserine (ionotropic glutamate NMDA receptor glycine site partial agonist) and lurasidone (atypical antipsychotic/non-selective monoamine receptor modulator) – bipolar depression
- Lumateperone (Caplyta; ITI-007; ITI-722) – atypical antipsychotic (non-selective monoamine receptor modulator) – bipolar disorders
- Risperidone extended release (LYN-005) – atypical antipsychotic (non-selective monoamine receptor modulator) – schizoaffective disorder
- SEP-4199 (non-racemic amisulpride; aramisulpride/esamisulpride [85:15 ratio]) – dopamine D_{2} and D_{3} receptor antagonist and serotonin 5-HT_{2B} and 5-HT_{7} receptor antagonist – bipolar depression
- Xanomeline/trospium chloride (BMS-986510; Cobenfy; KarXT; LY-246708/trospium chloride) – combination of xanomeline (non-selective muscarinic acetylcholine receptor agonist) and trospium chloride (peripherally selective non-selective muscarinic acetylcholine receptor antagonist) – bipolar disorders

=== Phase 2/3 ===
- Opakalim (BHV-7000; BPN-25203; KB-3061) – K_{v}7.2 and K_{v}7.3 potassium channel opener – bipolar disorders

=== Phase 2 ===
- Aldesleukin (ILT-101; interleukin-2; IL2; IL-2) – recombinant interleukin-2 (IL-2) replacement (interleukin-2 receptor agonist) – bipolar disorders
- Amdiglurax (ALTO-100; NSI-189) – unknown mechanism of action (hippocampal neurogenesis stimulant and indirect brain-derived neurotrophic factor (BDNF) modulator) – bipolar depression
- Brilaroxazine (RP-5000; RP-5063) – atypical antipsychotic (non-selective monoamine receptor modulator) – schizoaffective disorder
- Cenobamate (ONO-2017; Ontozry; senovamate; X-Copri; XCopri; YKP-3089) – voltage-gated sodium channel (VGSC) blocker and GABA release enhancer – bipolar disorders
- Desmethyl cariprazine prodrug (ABBV-932; RGH-932) – atypical antipsychotic (non-selective monoamine receptor modulator) – bipolar depression, bipolar disorders
- Direclidine (HTL-0016878; NBI-1117568; NBI-568) – muscarinic acetylcholine M_{4} receptor agonist – bipolar I disorders
- Ebselen (DR-3305; ebselene; ebseleno; ebselenum; harmokisane; PZ-51; SPI-1005; SPI-3005) – various actions – bipolar disorders
- Elunetirom (ABX-002) – thyroid hormone receptor beta (TRβ) agonist – bipolar depression
- Icalcaprant (ABBV-1354; CVL-354) – κ-opioid receptor antagonist – bipolar depression
- JNJ-8942 – undefined mechanism of action – bipolar disorders
- JNJ-18038683 – serotonin 5-HT_{7} receptor antagonist – bipolar disorders
- JNJ-55308942 – purine P2X_{7} receptor antagonist – bipolar depression
- Lithium cocrystal (AL-001-Alzamend Neuro; lithium salicylate/L-proline cocrystal) – undefined mechanism of action (mood stabilizer) – bipolar disorders, bipolar I disorders
- N-Methylamisulpride (LB-102) – dopamine D_{2} and D_{3} receptor antagonist and serotonin 5-HT_{2B} and 5-HT_{7} receptor antagonist – bipolar depression
- Navacaprant (BTRX-140; BTRX-335140; CYM-53093; NMRA-140; NMRA-335140) – κ-opioid receptor antagonist – bipolar depression
- OSU-6162 (PNU-9639; PNU-96391; PNU-96391A) – dopamine D_{2} receptor agonist, serotonin 5-HT_{2A} receptor agonist, and so-called "dopamine stabilizer" – bipolar depression
- Psilocybin (COMP360; COMP-360) – non-selective serotonin receptor agonist, serotonin 5-HT_{2A} receptor agonist, and psychedelic hallucinogen – bipolar depression
- RAP-219 – AMPA receptor negative allosteric modulator – bipolar disorders
- Vortioxetine (Brintellix; LU-AA21004; LuAA 21004; Trintellix; Vortidif) – serotonin reuptake inhibitor, serotonin 5-HT_{1A} and 5-HT_{1B} receptor agonist, and serotonin 5-HT_{1D}, 5-HT_{3}, and 5-HT_{7} receptor antagonist – bipolar depression
- Zuranolone (BIIB-125; S-812217; SAGE-217; SGE-797; Zurzuvae) – GABA_{A} receptor positive allosteric modulator and neurosteroid – bipolar depression

=== Phase 1/2 ===
- Cariprazine (cariprazine depot) – atypical antipsychotic (non-selective monoamine receptor modulator) – bipolar disorders

=== Phase 1 ===
- Brilaroxazine (RP-5000; RP-5063) – atypical antipsychotic (non-selective monoamine receptor modulator) – bipolar disorders
- CB03-154 (CB-03; CB-003) – K_{v}7.2 and K_{v}7.3 potassium channel opener – bipolar disorders
- Scopolamine (DPI-385-CVS; DPI-386; DPI-386 Nasal Gel; DPI-386-SG; DPI-386-SS; DPI-387; DPI-521-CG; DPI-550-TBI; Inscop spray) – non-selective muscarinic acetylcholine receptor antagonist – bipolar depression

=== Clinical phase unknown ===
- LTX-001 – glutaminase inhibitor – bipolar disorders
- Quetiapine oral suspension – non-selective monoaminer eceptor modulator – bipolar disorders

=== Preclinical ===
- Estianeptine ((S)-tianeptine; TNX-4300) – peroxisome proliferator-activated receptor PPARβ/δ and PPARγ agonist

=== Research ===
- NORA-520 (NRT-023; brexanolone prodrug) – GABA_{A} receptor positive allosteric modulator and neurosteroid (brexanolone prodrug) – bipolar disorders

== Not under development ==
=== No development reported ===
- AMG-581 – undefined mechanism of action – schizoaffective disorder
- Aripiprazole controlled release (ZY-102) – atypical antipsychotic (non-selective monoamine receptor modulator) – bipolar disorders
- Aripiprazole transdermal (AQS-1301) – atypical antipsychotic (non-selective monoamine receptor modulator) – bipolar disorders
- AZD-4451 – undefined mechanism of action – bipolar disorders
- Cariprazine (MP-214; Reagila; RGH-188; Symvenu; Vraylar; WID-RGC20) – atypical antipsychotic (non-selective monoamine receptor modulator) – schizoaffective disorder
- Elpetrigine (GW293273; JZP-4) – volgate-gated sodium channel blocker and calcium channel blocker – bipolar disorders
- Esketamine (Falkieri; PG061; S-ketamine) – ionotropic glutamate NMDA receptor antagonist – bipolar depression
- Paliperidone controlled-release (DLP-115) – atypical antipsychotic (non-selective monoamine receptor modulator) – bipolar disorders
- Research programme: long-acting neuropsychiatric therapeutics - Teva (NP-201; NP-202; NP-202-Teva; NP201-Teva; risperidone long-acting implant; ropinirole long-acting implant) – monoamine receptor modulators – bipolar disorders
- SKL-PSY (FZ-016; SKL-PSY/FZ-016) – serotonin 5-HT_{1A} receptor agonist – bipolar disorders
- SPD-421 (DP-VPA) – voltage-gated sodium channel (VGSC) blocker, GABA transaminase (GABA-T) inhibitor, histone deacetylase inhibitor, other actions (valproic acid prodrug) – bipolar disorders
- SPN-802 – undefined mechanism of action – bipolar disorders
- Ziprasidone extended release (ziprasidone once-daily) – atypical antipsychotic (non-selective monoamine receptor modulator) – bipolar disorders

=== Suspended ===
- Uridine (RG-2417) – mitochondrial protein stimulant – bipolar disorders

=== Discontinued ===
- Armodafinil (CEP-10953; Nuvigil; R-modafinil) – atypical dopamine reuptake inhibitor (DRI) – bipolar depression
- Bifeprunox (DU-127090) – dopamine D_{2} and D_{3} receptor partial agonist and serotonin 5-HT_{1A} receptor partial agonist – bipolar disorders
- BL-1020 (AN-168; CYP-1020; perphenazine GABA ester; perphenazine-4-aminobutyrate) – dopamine receptor antagonist and GABA receptor agonist – schizoaffective disorder
- Eslicarbazepine acetate (Aptiom; BIA 2-093; Exalief; SEP-0002093; SEP-2093; Stedesa; Zebinix) – voltage-gated sodium channel (VGSC) blocker (eslicarbazepine prodrug) – bipolar disorders
- Gabapentin (CI-945; Gabapen; GOE-3450; Neurontin) – gabapentinoid (α_{2}δ voltage-dependent calcium channel blocker) – bipolar disorders
- Licarbazepine (GP-47779; LIC-477; licarbazapine) – voltage-gated sodium channel (VGSC) blocker
- Lisdexamfetamine (Elvanse; LDX; NRP-104; S-877489; SHP-489; SPD-489; Tyvense; Venvanse; Vyvanse) – norepinephrine–dopamine releasing agent (NDRA) – bipolar depression
- Lu AA39959 – ion channel modulator – bipolar depression, bipolar disorders
- Lu AF35700 – dopamine D_{1} receptor modulator, serotonin 5-HT_{2A} receptor modulator, and serotonin 5-HT_{6} receptor modulator – schizoaffective disorder
- MK-8189 – phosphodiesterase PDE10A inhibitor – bipolar disorders
- MP-101 (LY-2979165) – metabotropic glutamate mGlu_{2} and mGlu_{3} receptor agonist – bipolar disorders
- Oxcarbazepine (GP-47680; KIN-493; NPC-04; oxacarbazepine; TRI-476; Trileptal) – voltage-gated sodium channel (VGSC) blocker (licarbazepine prodrug) – bipolar disorders
- Oxcarbazepine extended-release – voltage-gated sodium channel (VGSC) blocker (licarbazepine prodrug) – bipolar disorders
- Paliperidone (9-hydroxyrisperidone; Invega; JNS-007ER; R0-76477; RO-76477) – atypical antipsychotic (non-selective monoamine receptor modulator) – bipolar disorders, manic episodes
- PF-04455242 (PF-4455242) – κ-opioid receptor antagonist – bipolar depression
- R-103 (ABS-103R; R-ABS-103; (R)-ABS-103) – "GABA receptor agonist" (valproic acid analogue) – bipolar disorders
- Radafaxine (GW-353162; bupropion metabolite) – norepinephrine–dopamine reuptake inhibitor (NDRI) – bipolar disorders
- Ralmitaront (NTX-2001; RG-7906; RO-6889450) – trace amine-associated receptor 1 (TAAR1) agonist – schizoaffective disorder
- Ramelteon (Rozerem; TAK-375; TAK-375SL) – melatonin MT_{1} and MT_{2} receptor agonist – bipolar depression, bipolar disorders
- Rapastinel (BV-102; GLYX-13; GLYX-13-peptide; GLYX-13-trifluoroacetate; TPPT-amide; TPPT-amide-trifluoroacetate) – ionotropic glutamate NMDA receptor glycine site partial agonist – bipolar depression
- Risperidone (risperidone LAI) – atypical antipsychotic (non-selective monoamine receptor modulator) – bipolar disorders
- scyllo-Inositol (AZD-103; ELND-005; quercinitol; scyllitol; scyllocyclohexanehexol; scylloinositol) – undefined mechanism of action – bipolar disorders
- SEP-378608 – undefined mechanism of action – bipolar disorders
- SR-31742A (SR-31742) – sigma receptor modulator – manic episodes
- Topiramate (Epitomax; KW-6485; KW-6485P; MCN 4853; RWJ 17021; Topamax; Topimax; Topina) – various actions – bipolar disorders
- Vabicaserin (PF-05208769; PF-5208769; SCA-136) – serotonin 5-HT_{2C} receptor agonist – bipolar disorders
- Vixotrigine (BIIB-074; CNV-1014802; GSK-1014802; raxatrigine) – Na_{v}1.7 voltage-gated sodium channel (VGSC) blocker – bipolar disorders
- Vofopitant (GR-205171) – neurokinin NK_{1} receptor antagonist – bipolar disorders
- Ziprasidone (CP-88059-01; CP-88059-1; Geodon; ME-2112; RQ-00000003; Zeldox) – atypical antipsychotic (non-selective monoamine receptor modulator) – bipolar depression
- Zonisamide (AD-810; AD-810N; CI-912; Excegran; Kinaplase; PD-110843; Tremode; Trerief; Zonegran) – various actions – manic episodes

== Clinically used drugs ==
=== Approved drugs ===
==== Atypical antipsychotics ====
- Aripiprazole (Abilify; Abilify Asimtufii; Abilify Maintena; Abilify MyCite; Abilitat; Ao Pai; Arlemide; Asimtufii; OPC-14597; OPC-14597 IMD; OPC-31) – atypical antipsychotic (non-selective monoamine receptor modulator) – bipolar disorders
- Asenapine (Atisenap; ME2136; ORG-5222; Saphris; SCH-900274; Sycrest) – atypical antipsychotic (non-selective monoamine receptor modulator) – bipolar disorders
- Cariprazine (MP-214; Reagila; RGH-188; Symvenu; Vraylar; WID-RGC20) – atypical antipsychotic (non-selective monoamine receptor modulator) – bipolar depression, bipolar disorders
- Iloperidone (Fanapt; Fanaptum; Fiapta; HP-873; ILO-522; VYV-683; Zomaril) – atypical antipsychotic (non-selective monoamine receptor modulator) – bipolar disorders
- Lumateperone (Caplyta; ITI-007; ITI-722) – atypical antipsychotic (non-selective monoamine receptor modulator) – bipolar depression
- Lurasidone (DSP-1349M; Latuda; SM-13496; SMP-13496) – atypical antipsychotic (non-selective monoamine receptor modulator) – bipolar depression
- Milsaperidone (Bysanti; P-88; VHX-869; VHX-896) – atypical antipsychotic (non-selective monoamine receptor modulator) – bipolar disorders
- Olanzapine (BR-5402; LY-170053; LY-170052; Midax; Zypadhera; Zyprexa; Zyprexa Relprevv; Zyprexa Velotab; Zyprexa Zydis) – atypical antipsychotic (non-selective monoamine receptor modulator) – bipolar depression, bipolar disorders, manic episodes
- Paliperidone (9-hydroxyrisperidone; Invega; JNS-007ER; R0-76477; RO-76477) – atypical antipsychotic (non-selective monoamine receptor modulator) – schizoaffective disorder
- Paliperidone palmitate (Erzofri; LY-03010; Meibirui; Ruibailai) – atypical antipsychotic (non-selective monoamine receptor modulator) – schizoaffective disorder
- Paliperidone palmitate (Byannli; Invega Hafyera; Invega Sustenna; Invega Trinza; RO-92670; Sustenna; Trevicta; Xeplion) – atypical antipsychotic (non-selective monoamine receptor modulator) – schizoaffective disorder
- Quetiapine (FK-949; FK949E; ICI-204636; Seroquel; Seroquel XL; Seroquel XR) – atypical antipsychotic (non-selective monoamine receptor modulator) – bipolar depression, bipolar disorders, manic episodes
- Risperidone (JNJ-410397-AAA; R-64766; R064766; Risperdal; Risperdal Consta; Risperdal Depot) – atypical antipsychotic (non-selective monoamine receptor modulator) – bipolar disorders
- Risperidone extended release (LY-03004; Rykindo) – atypical antipsychotic (non-selective monoamine receptor modulator) – bipolar disorders
- Risperidone long-acting injectable (Longavo; mdc-IRM; TEV-46000; TV-46000; Uzedy) – atypical antipsychotic (non-selective monoamine receptor modulator) – bipolar disorders
- Ziprasidone (CP-88059-01; CP-88059-1; Geodon; ME-2112; RQ-00000003; Zeldox) – atypical antipsychotic (non-selective monoamine receptor modulator) – bipolar disorders

==== Anticonvulsants ====
- Lamotrigine (430C78; BW-430C; Labileno; Lamactil; Lamictal; Lamictin; Lamitrin) – volgate-gated sodium channel (VGSC) blocker – bipolar disorders
- Lamotrigine oral suspension (Subvenite) – volgate-gated sodium channel (VGSC) blocker – bipolar disorders
- Lamotrigine orally disintegrating tablet (EUR-1048; Lamictal ODT; lamotrigine ODT) – voltage-gated sodium channel (VGSC) blocker – bipolar disorders
- Valproate semisodium (sodium valproate; Depakote; Depakote ER; divalproex; divalproex sodium; Epival; Epival ER; LA40220) – voltage-gated sodium channel (VGSC) blocker, GABA transaminase (GABA-T) inhibitor, histone deacetylase inhibitor, other actions – bipolar disorders
- Valproic acid oral (Stavzor; Stavzor ER) – voltage-gated sodium channel (VGSC) blocker, GABA transaminase (GABA-T) inhibitor, histone deacetylase inhibitor, other actions – bipolar disorders

==== Lithium salts ====
- Lithium carbonate (Eskalith, Eskalith CR, Lithane, Lithonate, Lithobid) – unknown mechanism of action (mood stabilizer) – manic episodes
- Lithium citrate (Cibalith-S, Litarex, Lithonate, Priadel) – unknown mechanism of action (mood stabilizer) – manic episodes
- Lithium sulphate (lithium sulfate; Lithionit) – unknown mechanism of action (mood stabilizer) – manic episodes

==== Protein kinase C inhibitors ====
- Endoxifen (4-hydroxy-N-desmethyltamoxifen; Z-endoxifen) – selective estrogen receptor modulator (SERM) and protein kinase C (PKC) inhibitor – manic episode with or without mixed features

==== Combination drugs ====
- Olanzapine/fluoxetine (OFC; Symbyax; ZypZac) – combination of olanzapine (atypical antipsychotic/non-selective monoamine receptor modulator) and fluoxetine (selective serotonin reuptake inhibitor) – bipolar disorders
- Olanzapine/samidorphan (ALKS-33/olanzapine; ALKS-3831; Lybalvi) – combination of olanzapine (atypical antipsychotic/non-selective monoamine receptor modulator) and samidorphan (non-selective opioid receptor antagonist) – bipolar disorders

=== Off-label drugs ===
- α_{2}-Adrenergic receptor agonists (e.g., clonidine, dexmedetomidine) (for acute agitation)
- Anticonvulsants (e.g., carbamazepine, gabapentin, levetiracetam, oxcarbazepine, phenytoin, pregabalin, tiagabine, topiramate, zonisamide)
- Antidepressants (for bipolar depression—but may cause manic or rapid cycling switches)
- Antipsychotics (e.g., haloperidol, chlorpromazine, perphenazine, fluphenazine, zuclopenthixol, loxapine)
- Benzodiazepines (e.g., diazepam, clonazepam, lorazepam) (for acute agitation)
- κ-Opioid receptor agonists (KOR agonists) (e.g., pentazocine) (for acute mania)
- Tamoxifen – selective estrogen receptor modulator (SERM) and protein kinase C (PKC) inhibitor

== See also ==
- Lists of investigational drugs
- List of investigational antidepressants
- List of investigational antipsychotics
- Treatment of bipolar disorder
