= Cynapsus Therapeutics =

Cynapsus Therapeutics Inc.
- Company type: Subsidiary
- Industry: Pharmaceuticals
- Founded: 1984; 42 years ago
- Headquarters: Marlborough, Massachusetts, United States
- Parent: Sunovion
- Website: http://www.sunovion.com

Cynapsus Therapeutics Inc. is a specialty pharmaceutical company developing a drug to treat the motor symptoms of Parkinson's disease. Based in Toronto, Ontario, Canada. Formerly named Cannasat Therapeutics they changed their name to Cynapsus Therapeutics in 2010.

In September 2016, Sunovion (a subsidiary of Dainippon Sumitomo Pharma) announced it would acquire Cynapsus Therapeutics for approximately $624 million.

== Company overview ==
Cynapsus is a specialty pharmaceutical company developing the only oral (sublingual) delivery of the only approved drug (apomorphine) to treat the motor symptoms of Parkinson's disease. Over one million people in the United States and an estimated 5 million people globally suffer from Parkinson's disease. Parkinson's disease is a chronic and progressive neurodegenerative disease that impacts motor activity, and its prevalence is increasing with the aging of the population. Based on the IMPACT Registry Study and the results of Cynapsus' Global 500 Neurologists Survey, it is estimated that between 25 percent and 50 percent of patients experience "off" episodes in which they have impaired movement or speaking capabilities. Current medications only control the disease's symptoms, and most drugs become less effective over time as the disease progresses.

Cynapsus' lead drug candidate, APL-130277, is an easy-to-administer, fast-acting and oral reformulation of an approved drug, apomorphine, used to rescue patients from "off" episodes. Cynapsus is focused on rapidly maximizing the value of APL-130277 by completing pivotal studies in advance of a New Drug Application expected to be submitted in 2015. Cynapsus anticipates out-licensing to an appropriate pharmaceutical partner before such an application is submitted.

== Products ==
=== APL-130277 ===
APL-130277 is a reformulation of an approved Parkinson's drug. APL-130277 is a novel oral formulation of an approved drug for Parkinson's patients designed to deliver significant clinical benefits over the current marketed treatment. The drug will treat patients with moderate to severe PD and address a significant unmet clinical need as expressed by clinicians and patients. The drug is expected to undergo accelerated approval through 505(b)(2) FDA regulatory pathway with the US FDA and a similar pathway with other international regulatory agencies. This well developed regulatory path could result in a New Drug Approval application being submitted in late 2014 or early 2015. APL-130277 has the potential to address a significant underserved portion of $3 Billion+ Parkinson's Disease market.

Cynapsus has entered into an agreement with Adagio Pharmaceuticals Ltd. granting Cynapsus the option to execute a proposed exclusive, worldwide agreement to license all intellectual property relating to and issued from continuing development APL-130277.
