= Sumitomo Pharma =

Pharmaceutical company based in Japan

Sumitomo Pharma Company Limited

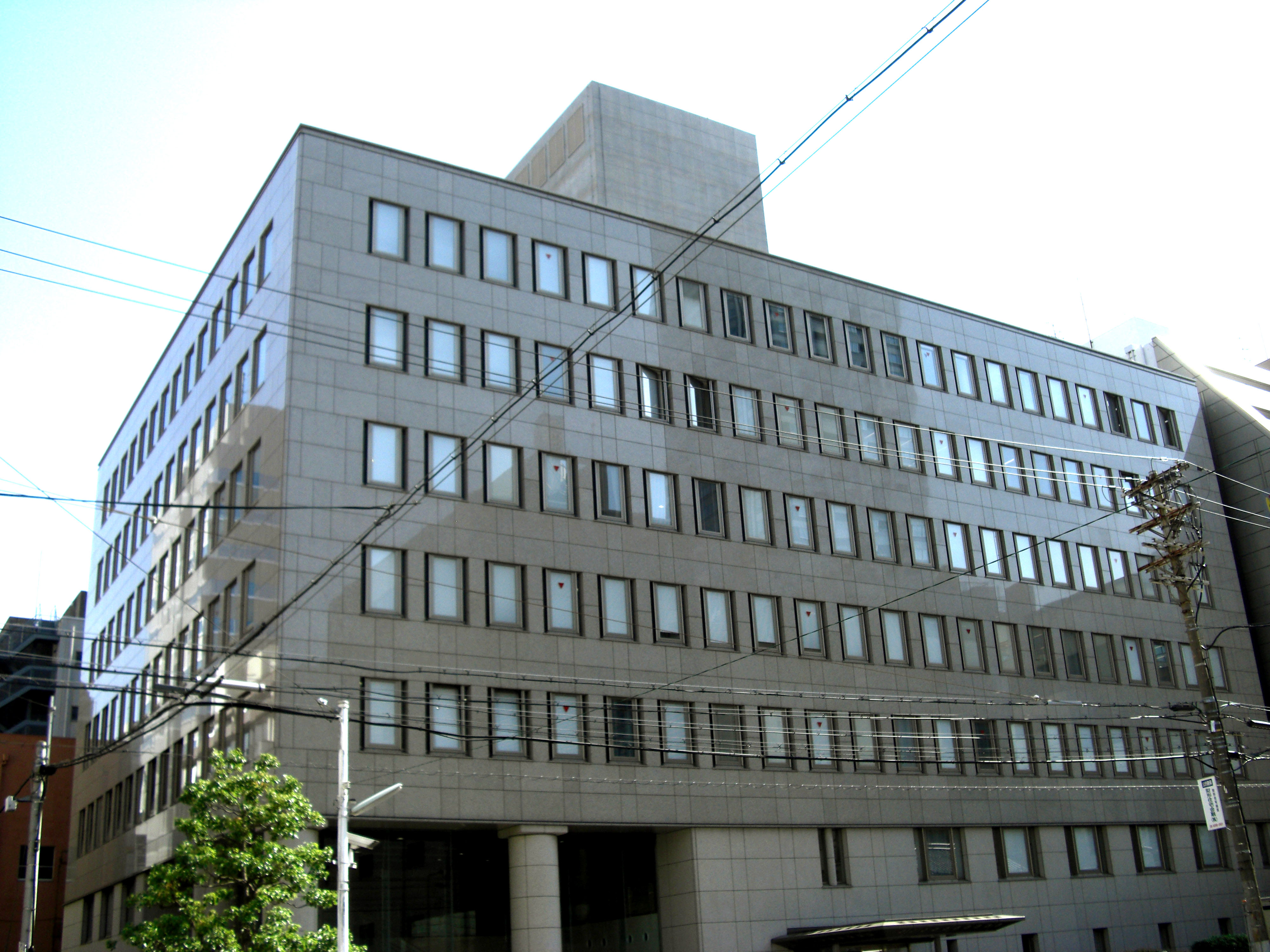
- Type: Public
- Traded as: TYO: 4506
- Industry: Biotech; Pharmaceuticals
- Predecessors: Dainippon Pharmaceuticals; Sumitomo Pharmaceuticals
- Founded: October 1, 2005; 21 years ago (merger of Dainippon Pharmaceuticals & Sumitomo Pharmaceuticals)
- Headquarters: Doshomachi, Chuo-ku, Osaka, Japan
- Key people: Hiroshi Nomura (president and CEO)
- Brands: Latuda; Lunesta; Aptiom; Orgovyx; Gemtesa; Brovana
- Revenue: $4.18 billion (¥555.54 billion) (FY 2022)
- Operating income: -$580 million (-¥77.0 billion) (FY 2022)
- Net income: -$728 million (-¥96.7 billion) (FY 2022)
- Total assets: $8.55 billion (¥1,134.7 billion) (FY 2022)
- Total equity: $3.06 billion (¥406.8 billion) (FY 2022)
- Number of employees: 6,250 (consolidated); 3,026 (non-consolidated) (as of March 31, 2023)
- Website: www.sumitomo-pharma.com

Sumitomo Pharma Company Limited (住友ファーマ株式会社, Sumitomo Fāma Kabushiki-Gaisha) is a Japanese multinational pharmaceutical company. The company is focused on oncology, psychiatry, neurology, women's health issues, urological diseases among other areas. Its headquarters are located in Chuo-ku, Osaka.

== History ==
The original Dainippon Pharmaceuticals (Dainippon Seiyaku) was established in 1885 by Nagayo Sensai, a graduate of Tekijuku – the first private medical school in Japan established by Ogata Kōan. It was set up as a wholly privately owned company funded by individuals from Tokyo and Osaka, with the government lending it land and buildings. Technical expertise for the enterprise was provided by Shibata Shokei and Nagai Nagayoshi.

The company started its operation in the same year with equipment imported from Germany. The main products were tincture and other similar drugs listed in the Japanese Pharmacopoeia. Among them was ephedrine, an anti-asthma drug invented by Nagai. In 1893, however, Nagai left the company and the business started to record operating losses. In 1898 it was acquired by Osaka Seiyaku.

The company produced methamphetamine under the brand name Philopon during WWII for the Imperial Japanese military.

Years later, Sumitomo Pharmaceuticals was incorporated separately in 1984 as a subsidiary of Sumitomo Chemical. Dainippon and Sumitomo merged on October 1, 2005, to create Dainippon Sumitomo Pharma. As a result, Sumitomo Chemical has maintained a 51%+ ownership in the company since.

Operating without a sales foothold in North America, then-Sumitomo Dainippon Pharma acquired NASDAQ-traded Sepracor for $2.6B in 2009, renaming its new stand-alone subsidiary Sunovion in 2010. Under Sunovion management, Sumitomo Dainippon Pharma was able to successfully market its $2B blockbuster drug Latuda in North America, an atypical antipsychotic approved for the treatment of schizophrenia and depressive episodes associated with Bipolar I disorder. In addition to Latuda, Sunovion achieved other notable commercial achievements with marketed drugs such as Lunesta, Aptiom, and Brovana.

In September 2016, the Sunovion subsidiary announced it would acquire Cynapsus Therapeutics for approximately $624 million, to expand Sunovion's central nervous system drug portfolio. With the deal, Sunovion would acquire Cynapsus' then-Phase III Parkinson's disease candidate drug Kynmobi, a sublingual formulation of apomorphine.

Sumitomo Dainippon Pharma announced a $3B upfront acquisition in September 2019 of five Roivant subsidiaries, including Urovant and Enzyvant.

On April 1, 2022, the company was renamed from Sumitomo Dainippon Pharma to Sumitomo Pharma.

In October 2022, Sumitomo Pharma announced the acquisition of all outstanding shares in Myovant, a former Roivant subsidiary it was previously a majority owner of, valuing the company at $2.9B.

Following the Myovant acquisition in April 2023, Sumitomo Pharma consolidated its US subsidiaries to form Sumitomo Pharma America, Inc., a wholly owned subsidiary biopharmaceutical company focused on "delivering therapeutic and scientific breakthroughs in areas of critical patient needs spanning psychiatry and neurology, oncology, urology, women's health, rare disease, and cell and gene therapies".

On 26 September 2025, Sumitomo Pharma's stock price fell 5.33%, following US President Donald Trump's announcement of fresh tariffs on pharmaceutical products.

=== Acquisition history ===
The following is an illustration of the company's major mergers and acquisitions and historical predecessors:

- Sumitomo Pharma (Previously known as Dainippon Sumitomo Pharma)
  - Sumitomo Pharma America, Inc. (Reorganised 2023)
    - Sepracor, Inc. (Acq 2009, renamed to Sunovion Pharmaceuticals Inc. 2010)
      - IBF Biotechnics (Acq 1991)
      - New England Pharmaceuticals (Acq 1995)
      - Oryx Pharmaceuticals (Acq 2008)
      - Elevation Pharmaceuticals (Acq 2012)
      - Cynapsus Therapeutics (Acq 2016)
    - Sumitomo Pharma America Holdings
    - Sumitomo Pharma Oncology
    - Sumitovant Biopharma
      - Myovant Sciences (Acq 2019)
      - Urovant Sciences (Acq 2019)
      - Enzyvant Therapeutics (Acq 2019)
      - Altavant Sciences (Acq 2019)
    - Spirovant Sciences (Acq 2019)
  - Boston Biomedical (Acq 2012)
  - Tolero Pharmaceuticals (Acq 2016)
