= C15H12N2O2 =

The molecular formula C_{15}H_{12}N_{2}O_{2} (molar mass: 252.27 g/mol, exact mass: 252.0899 u) may refer to:

- Oxcarbazepine
- Phenytoin (PHT)
