= HA-966 =

Chemical compound

Identifiers
- IUPAC name: 3-Amino-1-hydroxy-pyrrolidin-2-one
- CAS Number: 1003-51-6
- PubChem CID: 1232
- ChemSpider: 1195
- UNII: F2JLV9220T
- CompTox Dashboard (EPA): DTXSID90905333
- ECHA InfoCard: 100.162.446

Chemical and physical data
- Formula: C_{4}H_{8}N_{2}O_{2}
- Molar mass: 116.120 g·mol^{−1}
- 3D model (JSmol): Interactive image
- SMILES: O=C1C(CCN1O)N
- InChI: InChI=1S/C4H8N2O2/c5-3-1-2-6(8)4(3)7/h3,8H,1-2,5H2; Key:HCKUBNLZMKAEIN-UHFFFAOYSA-N

HA-966 or (±)-3-amino-1-hydroxy-pyrrolidin-2-one is a molecule used in scientific research as a glycine receptor and NMDA receptor antagonist / low efficacy partial agonist. It has neuroprotective and anticonvulsant, anxiolytic, antinociceptive and sedative / hypnotic effects in animal models. Pilot human clinical trials in the early 1960s showed that HA-966 appeared to benefit patients with tremors of extrapyramidal origin.

The two enantiomers of HA-966 have differing pharmacological activity. The glycine/N-methyl-D-aspartate receptor antagonist activity is specific to the (R)-(+)-enantiomer, whereas the sedative and ataxic effects are specific to the (S)-(-)-enantiomer.

(R)-(+)-HA-966 did not induce drug-appropriate responding in animals trained to discriminate phencyclidine (PCP) from saline, suggesting that the glycine receptor ligand (R)-(+)-HA-966 has a significantly different behavioral profile than drugs affecting the ion channel of the NMDA receptor complex.

(S)-(-)-HA-966 has been described as a "γ-hydroxybutyric acid (GHB)-like agent" and a "potent y-butyrolactone-like sedative", but it shows no affinity for the GABA_{B} receptor (GABA_{B}R).

HA-966 is structurally a cyclized derivative of norvaline hydroxamate.

== See also ==
- Rapastinel
- NRX-1074
