= Cycloserine/lurasidone =

Combination drug

Combination of
- Cycloserine: NMDA receptor modulator
- Lurasidone: Atypical antipsychotic

Clinical data
- Other names: NRX-101; Cyclurad
- Routes of administration: By mouth
- ATC code: None

Legal status
- Legal status: US: Investigational New Drug

Cycloserine/lurasidone, developmental code name NRX-101 and tentative brand name Cyclurad, is a combination formulation of the antibiotic D-cycloserine, a partial agonist of the glycine site of the NMDA receptor, and lurasidone, an atypical antipsychotic, which is under development by NeuroRx for the treatment of acute suicidal ideation/behavior (ASIB). As of May 2016, it has completed a phase II clinical trial for bipolar depression. In September 2017, the drug received fast track designation for bipolar depression from the United States Food and Drug Administration.

Currently preclinical information on Cyclurad comes from two phase II clinical trials looking at the significance/efficacy of D-cycloserine in the treatment of depression, in which D-cycloserine could be a cost-effective target for novel pharmaceutics (Phase II). There is a clinical trial slated for treatment of ASIB; however, enrollment for the study has not been started as of yet. The investigators will administer an intravenous infusion of ketamine 0.5 mg/kg over 40 minutes, and if the patients respond satisfactory, as deemed by the investigators, then they will be administered a dose Cyclurad or to a comparator group. This clinical trial is in part supported by a letter the editor in the Journal of Clinical Psychiatry, where patients received an acute dose of ketamine, followed by daily D-cycloserine. Patients appeared to show a decrease in depression scores, based Hamilton Depression Rating Scale and Beck Depression Inventory, in the treatment arm. Along with this letter, D-cycloserine was also used in a similar scenario with treatment resistant depression. In this trial, patients were administered either D-cycloserine or a placebo. The main significance of this trial were not just the results from the treatment, but the fact that D-cycloserine, which is an NMDA partial agonist, has potential therapeutic role in treating depression.

== See also ==
- List of investigational antidepressants
- List of investigational bipolar disorder drugs
