= NYX-2925 =

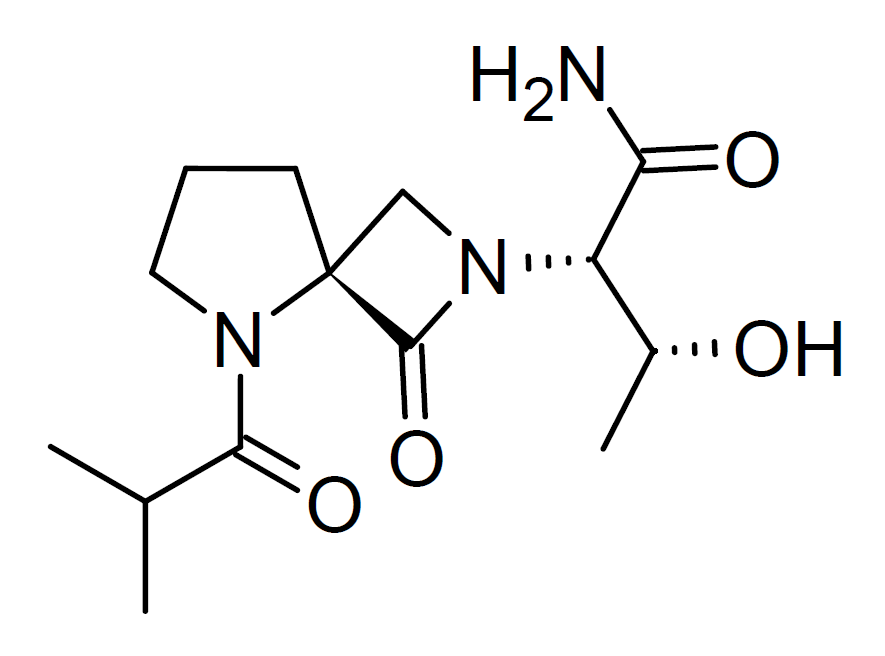

Clinical data
- Drug class: Selective NMDA receptor modulator
- ATC code: None

Legal status
- Legal status: US: Investigational New Drug

Identifiers
- IUPAC name: (2S,3R)-3-hydroxy-2-[(4R)-5-(2-methylpropanoyl)-3-oxo-2,5-diazaspiro[3.4]octan-2-yl]butanamide
- CAS Number: 2012536-16-0
- PubChem CID: 122594417
- IUPHAR/BPS: 11289
- DrugBank: DB19149
- ChemSpider: 128922021
- UNII: X062KF5ZV3
- ChEMBL: ChEMBL5095189

Chemical and physical data
- Formula: C_{14}H_{23}N_{3}O_{4}
- Molar mass: 297.355 g·mol^{−1}
- 3D model (JSmol): Interactive image
- SMILES: C[C@H]([C@@H](C(=O)N)N1C[C@@]2(C1=O)CCCN2C(=O)C(C)C)O
- InChI: InChI=1S/C14H23N3O4/c1-8(2)12(20)17-6-4-5-14(17)7-16(13(14)21)10(9(3)18)11(15)19/h8-10,18H,4-7H2,1-3H3,(H2,15,19)/t9-,10+,14-/m1/s1; Key:NFXPEHLDVKVVKA-ISTVAULSSA-N

NYX-2925 is a compound derived from rapastinel which acts as a positive allosteric modulator of the NMDA receptor. It has been researched as a potential antidepressant and treatment for neuropathic pain.
