= C15H14N2O2 =

The molecular formula C_{15}H_{14}N_{2}O_{2} may refer to:

- Licarbazepine
- Nepafenac
- Pyrrolidonyl-β-naphthylamide
