= Apimostinel =

Investigational antidepressant compound

Clinical data
- Other names: NRX-1074; AGN-241660; Threonyl-prolyl-2R-(2-benzyl)-prolyl-threonine amide
- Routes of administration: By mouth
- Drug class: NMDA receptor modulator

Legal status
- Legal status: US: Investigational New Drug

Identifiers
- IUPAC name: (2R)-1-[(2S)-1-[(2S,3R)-2-Amino-3-hydroxybutanoyl]pyrrolidine-2-carbonyl]-N-[(2S,3R)-1-amino-3-hydroxy-1-oxobutan-2-yl]-2-benzylpyrrolidine-2-carboxamide
- CAS Number: 1421866-48-9
- PubChem CID: 71249967
- ChemSpider: 52085607
- UNII: TTT1F11FZB
- KEGG: D11299
- ChEMBL: ChEMBL3545230
- CompTox Dashboard (EPA): DTXSID101031863

Chemical and physical data
- Formula: C_{25}H_{37}N_{5}O_{6}
- Molar mass: 503.600 g·mol^{−1}
- 3D model (JSmol): Interactive image
- SMILES: C[C@@H](O)[C@H](N)C(=O)N1CCC[C@H]1C(=O)N2CCC[C@@]2(Cc3ccccc3)C(=O)N[C@@H]([C@@H](C)O)C(N)=O
- InChI: InChI=1S/C25H37N5O6/c1-15(31)19(26)23(35)29-12-6-10-18(29)22(34)30-13-7-11-25(30,14-17-8-4-3-5-9-17)24(36)28-20(16(2)32)21(27)33/h3-5,8-9,15-16,18-20,31-32H,6-7,10-14,26H2,1-2H3,(H2,27,33)(H,28,36)/t15-,16-,18+,19+,20+,25-/m1/s1; Key:DVBUEXCIEIAXPM-PJUQSVSOSA-N

Apimostinel (GATE-202, formerly NRX-1074) is an investigational antidepressant, acting as a novel and selective modulator of the NMDA receptor. It is currently under development for the acute treatment of major depressive disorder (MDD) by Syndeio Biosciences, and previously by Naurex and Allergan. As of February 2015, an intravenous formulation of apimostinel has completed a phase IIa clinical trial for MDD.

Similar to rapastinel (GLYX-13), its mechanism of action acts through a unique binding site on the NMDA receptor, independent of the glycine site, to modulate receptor activity and enhance NMDAR-mediated synaptic plasticity. However, apimostinel is 1000-fold more potent in vitro and is intended as an improved, follow-up drug to rapastinel. Similar to rapastinel, apimostinel is an amidated tetrapeptide, but has been structurally modified, via the addition of a benzyl group, to enhance its metabolic stability and pharmacokinetic profile. The drug has shown rapid and potent antidepressant effects in pre-clinical models of depression. In addition, similarly to rapastinel, it is well tolerated and lacks the hallucinosis-like psychotomimetic effects of NMDA receptor antagonists such as ketamine.

== See also ==
- List of investigational antidepressants
- Zelquistinel
