= JNJ-18038683 =

Chemical compound

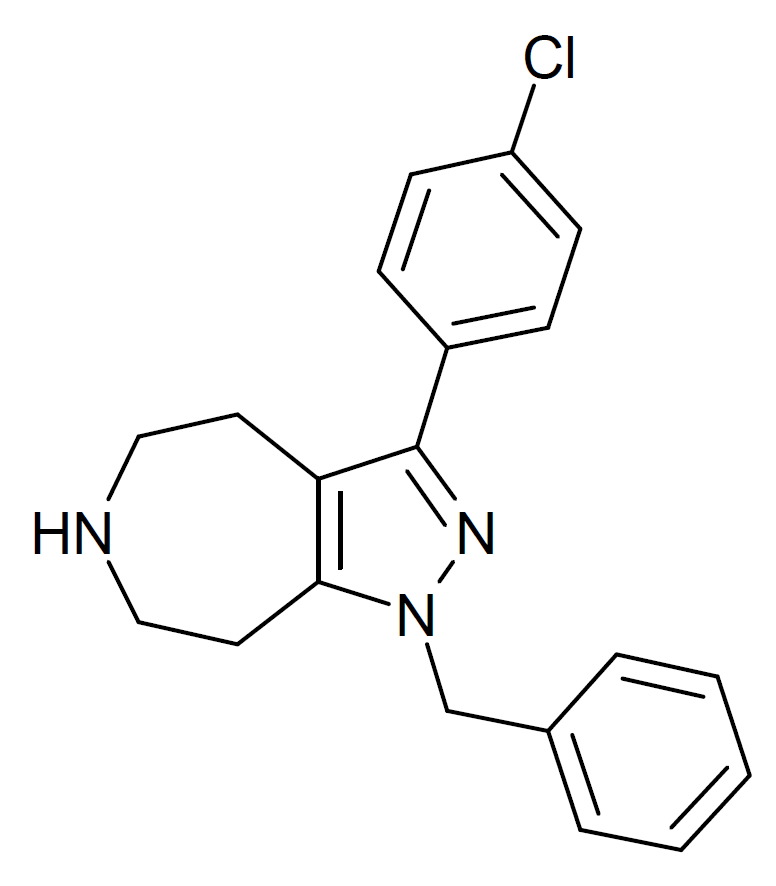

Identifiers
- IUPAC name: 1-benzyl-3-(4-chlorophenyl)-5,6,7,8-tetrahydro-4H-pyrazolo[3,4-d]azepine
- CAS Number: 851373-91-6
- PubChem CID: 11151899
- ChemSpider: 9327007
- UNII: 28PGH5X4OQ
- CompTox Dashboard (EPA): DTXSID001336543

Chemical and physical data
- Formula: C_{20}H_{20}ClN_{3}
- Molar mass: 337.85 g·mol^{−1}
- 3D model (JSmol): Interactive image
- SMILES: C1CNCCC2=C1C(=NN2CC3=CC=CC=C3)C4=CC=C(C=C4)Cl
- InChI: InChI=1S/C20H20ClN3/c21-17-8-6-16(7-9-17)20-18-10-12-22-13-11-19(18)24(23-20)14-15-4-2-1-3-5-15/h1-9,22H,10-14H2; Key:UKJPMZGILXATGT-UHFFFAOYSA-N

JNJ-18038683 is a potent and selective antagonist of the 5HT_{7} serotonin receptor discovered by Johnson & Johnson. It has nootropic and antidepressant effects in both animal and human studies and has progressed to Phase II trials as an adjunctive treatment for improving cognition and mood in stable bipolar disorder; it has been found to reduce REM sleep (the lightest stage of sleep, elevated in depression) in humans and block circadian rhythm phase-shift advances in mice.

It binds to the 5-HT6 serotonin receptor with 10x less affinity. At relevant doses, inhibition of 5-HT6 would be expected to render pro-cognitive and anti-dementia effects.

== See also ==
- List of investigational antidepressants
- List of investigational bipolar disorder drugs
