= Alanine racemase =

Enzyme family

alanine racemase
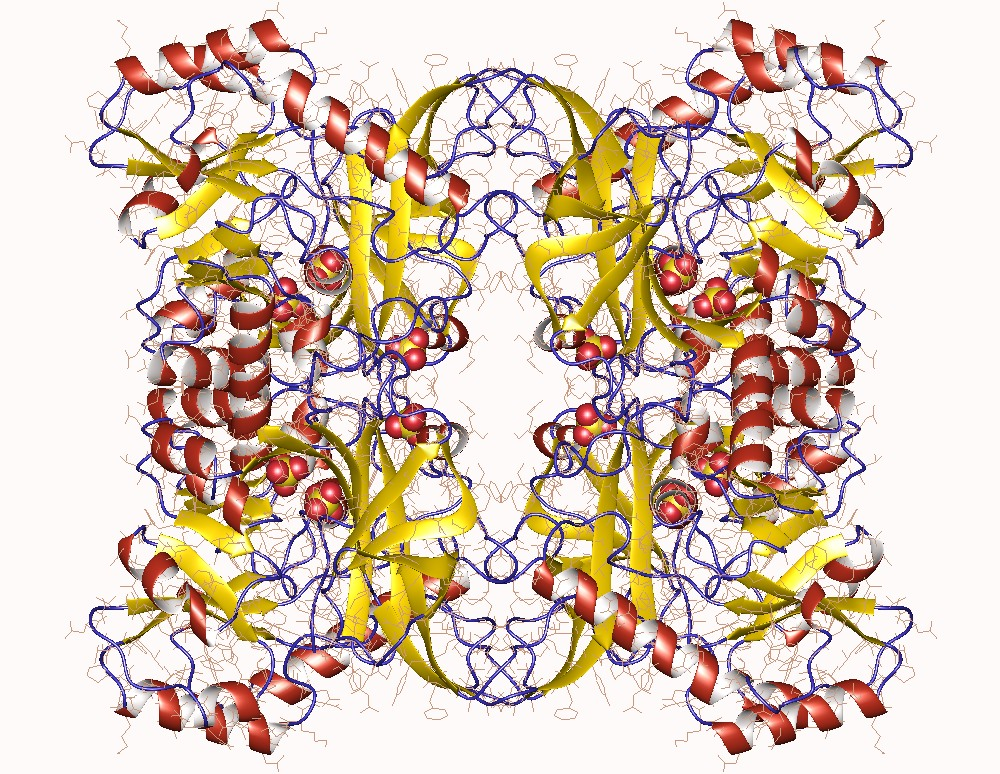
- Alanine racemase homotetramer, Oenococcus oeni

Identifiers
- EC no.: 5.1.1.1
- CAS no.: 9024-06-0

Databases
- IntEnz: IntEnz view
- BRENDA: BRENDA entry
- ExPASy: NiceZyme view
- KEGG: KEGG entry
- MetaCyc: metabolic pathway
- PRIAM: profile
- PDB structures: RCSB PDB PDBe PDBsum
- Gene Ontology: AmiGO / QuickGO
Search
- PMC: articles
- PubMed: articles
- NCBI: proteins

Ala_racemase_N
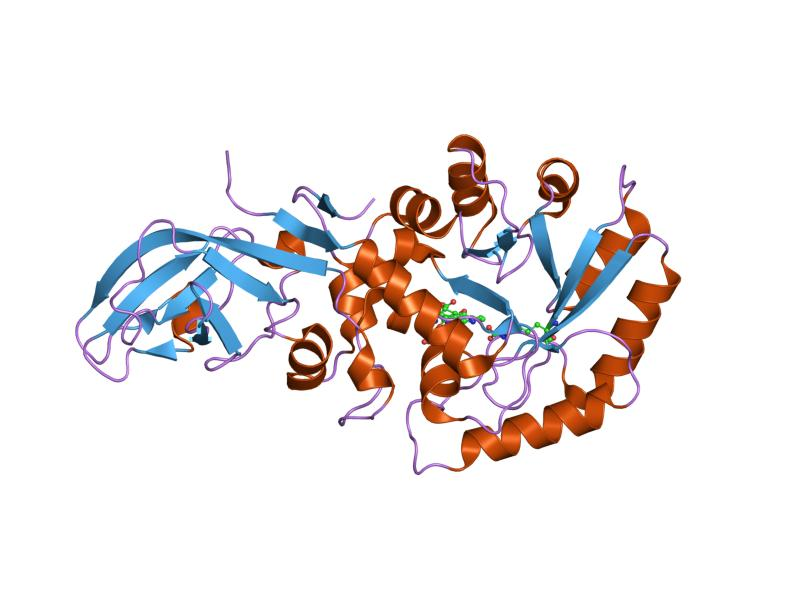
- The 1.45 Å a crystal structure of alanine racemase from a pathogenic bacterium, Pseudomonas aeruginosa, contains both internal and external aldimine forms.

Identifiers
- Symbol: Ala_racemase_N
- Pfam: PF01168
- Pfam clan: CL0036
- InterPro: IPR001608
- PROSITE: PDOC00332
- SCOP2: 1sft / SCOPe / SUPFAM
Available protein structures:
- Pfam: structures / ECOD
- PDB: RCSB PDB; PDBe; PDBj
- PDBsum: structure summary

Ala_racemase_C

Identifiers
- Symbol: Ala_racemase_C
- Pfam: PF00842
- InterPro: IPR011079
- PROSITE: PDOC00332
- SCOP2: 1sft / SCOPe / SUPFAM
Available protein structures:
- Pfam: structures / ECOD
- PDB: RCSB PDB; PDBe; PDBj
- PDBsum: structure summary

In enzymology, an alanine racemase (EC 5.1.1.1) is an enzyme that catalyzes the chemical reaction

L-alanine $\rightleftharpoons$ D-alanine

Hence, this enzyme has one substrate, L-alanine, and one product, D-alanine.

This enzyme belongs to the family of isomerases, specifically those racemases and epimerases acting on amino acids and derivatives. The systematic name of this enzyme class is alanine racemase. This enzyme is also called L-alanine racemase. This enzyme participates in alanine and aspartate metabolism and D-alanine metabolism. It employs one cofactor, pyridoxal phosphate. At least two compounds, 3-Fluoro-D-alanine and D-cycloserine are known to inhibit this enzyme.

The D-alanine produced by alanine racemase is used for peptidoglycan biosynthesis. Peptidoglycan is found in the cell walls of all bacteria, including many which are harmful to humans. The enzyme is absent in higher eukaryotes but found everywhere in prokaryotes, making alanine racemase a great target for antimicrobial drug development. Alanine racemase can be found in some invertebrates.

Bacteria can have one (alr gene) or two alanine racemase genes. Bacterial species with two genes for alanine racemase have one that is continually expressed and one that is inducible, which makes it difficult to target both genes for drug studies. However, knockout studies have shown that without the alr gene being expressed, the bacteria would need an external source of D-alanine in order to survive. Therefore, the alr gene is a feasible target for antimicrobial drugs.

Alanine racemase is the only known protein, as of 2002, to contain a left-handed α-helix of 5 amino acids, the longest left-handed α-helix found up until at that point.

== Structural studies ==
To catalyze the interconversion of D and L alanine, Alanine racemase must position residues capable of exchanging protons on either side of the alpha carbon of alanine. Structural studies of enzyme-inhibitor complexes suggest that Tyrosine 265 and Lysine 39 are these residues. The alpha-proton of the L-enantiomer is oriented toward Tyr265 and the alpha proton of the D-enantiomer is oriented toward Lys39 (Figure 1).

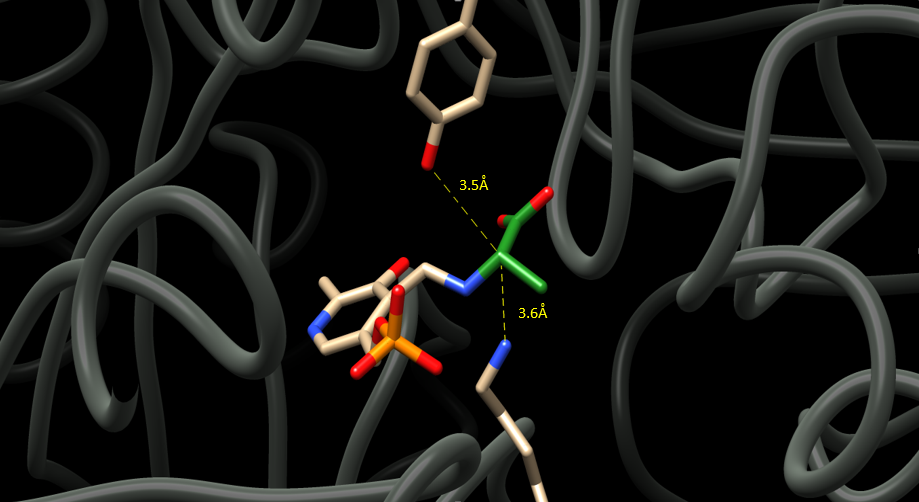
Figure 1. Active site of alanine racemase. Tyrosine-265 and Lysine-39 are displayed with their distances to the alpha-carbon of alanine, which is colored green and attached to PLP.

The distance between the enzyme residues and the enantiomers is 3.5 Å and 3.6 Å respectively. Structural studies of enzyme complexes with a synthetic L-alanine analog, a tight binding inhibitor and propionate further validate that Tyr265 and Lys39 are catalytic bases for the reaction,.

The PLP-L-Ala and PLP-D-Ala complexes are almost superimposability. The regions that do not overlap are the arms connected the pyridine ring of PLP and the alpha carbon of alanine. An interaction between both the phosphate oxygen and pyridine nitrogen atoms to the 5’phosphopyridoxyl region of PLP-Ala probably creates tight binding to the enzyme.

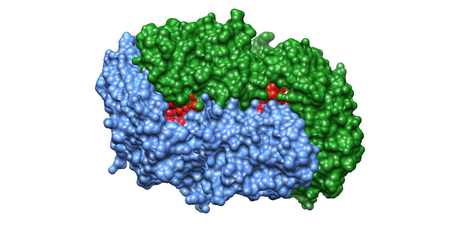
Figure 2. Surface diagram of alanine racemase. The two monomers are colored in blue and green. The two reaction sites are colored in red.

The structure of alanine racemase from Bacillus stearothermophilus (Geobacillus stearothermophilus) was determined by X-ray crystallography to a resolution of 1.9 A. The alanine racemase monomer is composed of two domains, an eight-stranded alpha/beta barrel at the N terminus, and a C-terminal domain essentially composed of beta-strand. A model of the two domain structure is shown in Figure 2. The N-terminal domain is also found in the PROSC (proline synthetase co-transcribed bacterial homolog) family of proteins, which are not known to have alanine racemase activity. The pyridoxal 5'-phosphate (PLP) cofactor lies in and above the mouth of the alpha/beta barrel and is covalently linked via an aldimine linkage to a lysine residue, which is at the C terminus of the first beta-strand of the alpha/beta barrel.

== Proposed mechanism ==
Reaction mechanisms are difficult to fully prove by experiment. The traditional mechanism attributed to an alanine racemase reaction is that of a two-base mechanism with a PLP-stabilized carbanion intermediate. PLP is used as an electron sink stabilize the negative charge resulting from the deprotonation of the alpha carbon. The two based mechanism favors reaction specificity compared to a one base mechanism. The second catalytic residue is pre-positioned to donate a proton quickly after a carbanionic intermediate is formed and thus reduces the chance of alternative reactions occurring. There are two potential conflicts with this traditional mechanism, as identified by Watanabe et al. First, Arg219 forms a hydrogen bond with pyridine nitrogen of PLP. The arginine group has a pKa of about 12.6 and is therefore unlikely to protonate the pyridine. Normally in PLP reactions an acidic amino acid residue such as a carboxylic acid group, with a pKa of about 5, protonates the pyridine ring. The protonation of the pyridine nitrogen allows the nitrogen to accept additional negative charge. Therefore, due to the Arg219, the PLP-stabilized carbanion intermediate is less likely to form. Another problem identified was the need for another basic residue to return Lys39 and Tyr265 back to their protonated and unprotonated forms for L-alanine and vice versa for D-alanine. Watanabe et al. found no amino acid residues or water molecules, other than the carboxylate group of PLP-Ala, to be close enough (within 4.5A) to protonate or deprotonate Lys or Tyr. This is shown in Figure 3.

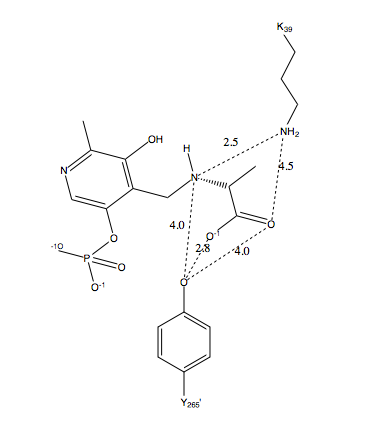
Figure 3. Schematic diagram of the distance between Lys39, Tyr 265, and PLP-L-Ala in the active site. All interactions shown are under 4.5 and therefore are capable of hydrogen bonding. Adapted from Watanabe et al.

Based on the crystal structures of N-(5’-phosphopyridoxyl) L- alanine (PKP-L-Ala ( and N-(5’-phosphopyridoxyl) D-alanine (PLP-D-Ala)

Watanabe et al. proposed an alternative mechanism in 2002, as seen in the figure 4. In this mechanism the carboxylate oxygen atoms of PLP-Ala directly participates in catalysis by mediating proton transfer between Lys39 and Tyr265. The crystallization structure identified that the carboxylate oxygen of PLP-L-Ala to the OH of Tyr265 was only 3.6 A and the carboxylate oxygen of PLP-L-Ala to the nitrogen of Lys39 was only 3.5 A. Therefore, both were close enough to cause a reaction.

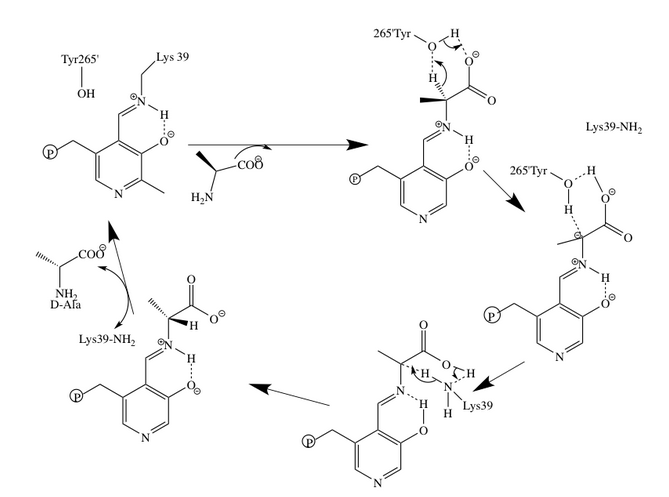
Figure 4: The mechanism is based on X-ray structures of PLP-L-Ala and PLP-D-Ala and molecular orbital calculations done by Watanabe (4).

This mechanism is supported by mutations of Arg219. Mutations changing Arg219 to a carboxylate result in a quinonoid intermediate being detected whereas none was detected with arginine. The arginine intermediate has much more free energy, is more unstable, than the acidic residue mutants. The destabilization of the intermediate promotes specificity of the reaction.
