= NORA-520 =

Clinical data
- Other names: NORA520; NRT-023; NRT023; Brexanolone prodrug
- Routes of administration: Oral
- Drug class: GABA_{A} receptor positive allosteric modulator; Neurosteroid

NORA-520, also known as NRT-023, is a prodrug of brexanolone (allopregnanolone) and hence GABA_{A} receptor positive allosteric modulator which is under development for the treatment of postpartum depression, major depressive disorder, essential tremor, bipolar disorder, epilepsy, and generalized anxiety disorder. In contrast to brexanolone itself, which must be used parenterally via intravenous infusion, NORA-520 is active and used via oral administration. The drug is under development by Gerbera Therapeutics. As of December 2025, it is in phase 2 clinical trials for postpartum depression, the preclinical research stage of development for major depressive disorder and essential tremor, and the research stage of development for bipolar disorder, epilepsy, and generalized anxiety disorder.

== See also ==
- List of investigational antidepressants
- List of investigational bipolar disorder drugs
- List of investigational generalized anxiety disorder drugs
- Brexanolone
- Zuranolone
- Ganaxolone
