= Rapastinel =

Chemical compound

Clinical data
- Other names: GLYX-13; BV-102
- Routes of administration: Intravenous
- Drug class: Selective NMDA receptor modulator
- ATC code: None

Legal status
- Legal status: US: Investigational New Drug

Identifiers
- IUPAC name: (S)-N-[(2S,3R)-1-amino-3-hydroxy-1-oxobutan-2-yl]-1-[(S)-1-((2S,3R)-2-amino-3-hydroxybutanoyl)pyrrolidine-2-carbonyl]pyrrolidine-2-carboxamide
- CAS Number: 117928-94-6
- PubChem CID: 14539800
- ChemSpider: 25069944
- UNII: 6A1X56B95E
- CompTox Dashboard (EPA): DTXSID501030481

Chemical and physical data
- Formula: C_{18}H_{31}N_{5}O_{6}
- Molar mass: 413.475 g·mol^{−1}
- 3D model (JSmol): Interactive image
- SMILES: C[C@H]([C@@H](C(=O)N1CCC[C@H]1C(=O)N2CCC[C@H]2C(=O)N[C@@H]([C@@H](C)O)C(=O)N)N)O
- InChI: InChI=1S/C18H31N5O6/c1-9(24)13(19)18(29)23-8-4-6-12(23)17(28)22-7-3-5-11(22)16(27)21-14(10(2)25)15(20)26/h9-14,24-25H,3-8,19H2,1-2H3,(H2,20,26)(H,21,27)/t9-,10-,11+,12+,13+,14+/m1/s1; Key:GIBQQARAXHVEGD-BSOLPCOYSA-N

Rapastinel (INN) (former developmental code name GLYX-13) is a novel antidepressant that was under development by Allergan (previously Naurex) as an adjunctive therapy for the treatment of treatment-resistant depression. It is a centrally active, intravenously administered (non-orally active) amidated tetrapeptide that acts as a novel and selective modulator of the NMDA receptor. The drug is a rapid-acting and long-lasting antidepressant as well as robust cognitive enhancer by virtue of its ability to enhance NMDA receptor-mediated signal transduction and synaptic plasticity.

== Clinical development ==
On March 3, 2014, the U.S. FDA granted Fast Track designation to the development of rapastinel as an adjunctive therapy in treatment-resistant major depressive disorder. As of 2015, the drug had completed phase II clinical development for this indication and achieved proof of concept as a rapid-acting antidepressant by demonstrating reduced depressive symptoms at days 1 through 7, as assessed by the HAM-D, without eliciting psychotomimetic or other significant side effects. On January 29, 2016, Allergan (who acquired Naurex in July 2015) announced that rapastinel had received Breakthrough Therapy designation from the U.S. FDA for adjunctive treatment of major depressive disorder.

On March 6, 2019, Allergan announced rapastinel failed to differentiate from placebo during phase III trials. Early successful clinical studies of rapastinel in depression spurred the development of next-generation compounds with similar mechanisms of action including apimostinel (GATE-202, NRX-1074), a 2nd generation analog with improved potency, and zelquistinel (GATE-251, AGN-241751), a 3rd generation small molecule with improved potency and high oral bioavailability.

== Pharmacology ==
Rapastinel binds to a novel and unique domain on the NMDA receptor complex that is distinct from the glycine co-agonist binding site. Rapastinel exhibits a biphasic dose response in vitro. At therapeutically relevant concentrations, rapastinel enhances glutamate-mediated NMDA receptor activity, independent of glycine co-agonism, and enhances the magnitude of NMDAR-mediated synaptic plasticity at excitatory synapses in the mPFC. Positive modulation of NMDA receptors by rapastinel produces antidepressant effects that are convergent with the NMDA receptor antagonist ketamine, however, rapastinel has no ketamine-like side effects such as cognitive impairment and psychotomimetic symptoms.

== Preclinical research ==
In addition to its rapid and sustained antidepressant effects, rapastinel has been shown to enhance memory and learning in both young adult and learning-impaired, aging rat models. It has been shown to increase Schaffer collateral-CA1 long-term potentiation in vitro. In concert with a learning task, rapastinel has also been shown to elevate gene expression of hippocampal NR1, a subunit of the NMDA receptor, in three-month-old rats. Neuroprotective effects have also been demonstrated in Mongolian Gerbils by delaying the death of CA1, CA3, and dentate gyrus pyramidal neurons under glucose and oxygen-deprived conditions.

== History ==
Rapastinel was originally invented by Joseph Moskal, the co-founder of Naurex, via structural modification of B6B21, a monoclonal antibody that similarly binds to and modulates the NMDA receptor.

== See also ==
- List of investigational antidepressants
- List of investigational bipolar disorder drugs
- NYX-2925
