= Elunetirom =

Clinical data
- Other names: ABX-002; ABX002; MA-JD21; MA-JD-21
- Routes of administration: Oral
- Drug class: Thyromimetic; Thyroid hormone receptor beta (TRβ) agonist

Identifiers
- IUPAC name: 2-[3,5-dichloro-4-[(4-hydroxy-3-propan-2-ylphenyl)methyl]phenoxy]-N-methylacetamide
- CAS Number: 2156649-32-8
- PubChem CID: 132160637
- DrugBank: DB18157
- ChemSpider: 129433137
- UNII: QTW4WC4BRX
- KEGG: D13273
- ChEMBL: ChEMBL5314909

Chemical and physical data
- Formula: C_{19}H_{21}Cl_{2}NO_{3}
- Molar mass: 382.28 g·mol^{−1}
- 3D model (JSmol): Interactive image
- SMILES: CC(C)C1=C(C=CC(=C1)CC2=C(C=C(C=C2Cl)OCC(=O)NC)Cl)O
- InChI: InChI=1S/C19H21Cl2NO3/c1-11(2)14-6-12(4-5-18(14)23)7-15-16(20)8-13(9-17(15)21)25-10-19(24)22-3/h4-6,8-9,11,23H,7,10H2,1-3H3,(H,22,24); Key:CQELSEDWYWTMDG-UHFFFAOYSA-N

Elunetirom, also known by its developmental code names ABX-002 and MA-JD21, is a thyroid hormone receptor agonist which is under development for the treatment of major depressive disorder, bipolar depression, multiple sclerosis, and adrenomyeloneuropathy. It is a prodrug of LL-340001 and acts as a potent, selective, and centrally penetrant agonist of the thyroid hormone receptor beta (TRβ). The drug produces psychoplastogenic effects similar to those of brain-derived neurotrophic factor (BDNF) in rodents. In addition, it has been found to improve cognitive impairment caused by old age or scopolamine treatment in rodents. Elunetirom is under development by Autobahn Therapeutics. As of December 2025, it is in phase 2 clinical trials for treatment of major depressive disorder and bipolar depression and is in the preclinical research stage of development for multiple sclerosis and adrenomyeloneuropathy.

== See also ==
- Thyromimetic
- List of investigational antidepressants
- List of investigational bipolar disorder drugs
