= BL-1020 =

Chemical compound

Identifiers
- IUPAC name: 2-[4-[3-(2-chlorophenothiazin-10-yl)propyl]piperazin-1-yl]ethyl 4-aminobutanoate
- CAS Number: 751477-01-7
- PubChem CID: 11203271
- ChemSpider: 9378339
- UNII: K1WO7H97QZ
- ChEMBL: ChEMBL1187646
- CompTox Dashboard (EPA): DTXSID401336321

Chemical and physical data
- Formula: C_{25}H_{33}ClN_{4}O_{2}S
- Molar mass: 489.08 g·mol^{−1}
- 3D model (JSmol): Interactive image
- SMILES: C1CN(CCN1CCCN2C3=CC=CC=C3SC4=C2C=C(C=C4)Cl)CCOC(=O)CCCN
- InChI: InChI=1S/C25H33ClN4O2S/c26-20-8-9-24-22(19-20)30(21-5-1-2-6-23(21)33-24)12-4-11-28-13-15-29(16-14-28)17-18-32-25(31)7-3-10-27/h1-2,5-6,8-9,19H,3-4,7,10-18,27H2; Key:BABFYCSPNDKXRI-UHFFFAOYSA-N

BL-1020 (perphenazine 4-aminobutanoate) is an investigational orally-active antipsychotic for the possible treatment of schizophrenia. The chemical is an ester of GABA and perphenazine; pharmacologically it acts as a D_{2} antagonist and GABA agonist. It has shown pro-cognitive effects in the trials. In March 2013, it went into the II/III trial phase. It has been introduced by BioLineRx, a biopharmaceutical development company.

== See also ==
- List of investigational antipsychotics
- List of investigational bipolar disorder drugs
