= Onfasprodil =

Chemical compound

Clinical data
- Other names: MIJ821
- Drug class: NMDA receptor modulator

Legal status
- Legal status: Investigational

Identifiers
- IUPAC name: 6-{(1S)-2-[(3aR,5R,6aS)-5-(2-Fluorophenoxy)hexahydrocyclopenta[c]pyrrol-2(1H)-yl]-1-hydroxyethyl}-3-pyridinol
- CAS Number: 1892581-29-1
- PubChem CID: 118981713
- ChemSpider: 115010425
- UNII: C6I8M5AWKP
- KEGG: D12787
- ChEMBL: ChEMBL5095074

Chemical and physical data
- Formula: C_{20}H_{23}FN_{2}O_{3}
- Molar mass: 358.413 g·mol^{−1}
- 3D model (JSmol): Interactive image
- SMILES: O([C@@H]1C[C@@]2([C@](C1)(CN(C[C@H](O)C3=CC=C(O)C=N3)C2)[H])[H])C4=C(F)C=CC=C4
- InChI: InChI=1S/C20H23FN2O3/c21-17-3-1-2-4-20(17)26-16-7-13-10-23(11-14(13)8-16)12-19(25)18-6-5-15(24)9-22-18/h1-6,9,13-14,16,19,24-25H,7-8,10-12H2/t13-,14+,16+,19-/m0/s1; Key:NEFQLCKWVRZEJA-ZDXGLAPJSA-N

Onfasprodil (MIJ821) is a drug delivered via intravenous infusion that is designed as a fast-acting treatment for treatment-resistant depression. It works as a negative allosteric modulator of the NMDA receptor subunit 2B (NR2B). The drug is developed by Novartis.
