= Eslicarbazepine acetate =

Anticonvulsant medication

Clinical data
- Trade names: Aptiom, Zebinix, Exalief
- AHFS/Drugs.com: Monograph
- License data: EU EMA: by INN
- Pregnancy category: AU: D
- Routes of administration: By mouth
- ATC code: N03AF04 (WHO)

Legal status
- Legal status: AU: S4 (Prescription only); CA: ℞-only; US: ℞-only; EU: Rx-only; In general: ℞ (Prescription only)

Pharmacokinetic data
- Protein binding: ~30%
- Metabolism: UGT (?)
- Metabolites: Eslicarbazepine (active), glucuronides (inactive), etc.
- Elimination half-life: 10–20 hours
- Excretion: ~90% renal

Identifiers
- IUPAC name: (S)-10-Acetoxy-10,11-dihydro-5H-dibenz[b,f]azepine-5-carboxamide
- CAS Number: 236395-14-5
- PubChem CID: 179344
- DrugBank: DB09119
- ChemSpider: 156110
- UNII: BEA68ZVB2K
- KEGG: D09612
- ChEBI: CHEBI:87016
- ChEMBL: ChEMBL87992
- CompTox Dashboard (EPA): DTXSID90178308
- ECHA InfoCard: 100.164.398

Chemical and physical data
- Formula: C_{17}H_{16}N_{2}O_{3}
- Molar mass: 296.326 g·mol^{−1}
- 3D model (JSmol): Interactive image
- SMILES: CC(=O)O[C@H]1Cc2ccccc2N(C(N)=O)c2ccccc21
- InChI: InChI=1S/C17H16N2O3/c1-11(20)22-16-10-12-6-2-4-8-14(12)19(17(18)21)15-9-5-3-7-13(15)16/h2-9,16H,10H2,1H3,(H2,18,21)/t16-/m0/s1; Key:QIALRBLEEWJACW-INIZCTEOSA-N

Eslicarbazepine acetate (ESL), sold under the brand names Aptiom and Zebinix among others, is an anticonvulsant medication approved for use in Europe and the United States as monotherapy or as additional therapy for partial-onset seizures epilepsy.

Similarly to oxcarbazepine, ESL behaves as a prodrug to (S)-(+)-licarbazepine. As such, their mechanisms of action are identical.

== Contraindications ==
Eslicarbazepine acetate is contraindicated in people with second- or third-degree atrioventricular block, a type of heart block, in the Austria-Codex. However heart block is not mentioned as a contraindication by the US FDA. It is contraindicated for people who are hypersensitive to eslicarbazepine, oxcarbazepine or carbamazepine.

== Adverse effects ==
Adverse effects are similar to oxcarbazepine. The most common ones (more than 10% of patients) are tiredness and dizziness. Other fairly common side effects (1 to 10%) include impaired coordination, gastrointestinal disorders such as diarrhoea, nausea and vomiting, rash (1.1%), and hyponatremia (low sodium blood levels, 1.2%). There may also be an increased risk of suicidal thoughts.

== Overdose ==
Symptoms of overdosing are similar to adverse effects of standard doses: severe hyponatraemia, somnolence, uncoordinated/unsteady gait, hemiparesis (weakness of one side of the body), along with visual and gastrointestinal disturbances. No specific antidote is available. Eslicarbazepine and metabolites can be dialyzed.

== Interactions ==
Like oxcarbazepine, eslicarbazepine can reduce plasma levels of drugs that are metabolized by the liver enzymes CYP3A4 (verified in studies for simvastatin and the oral contraceptive levonorgestrel/ethinylestradiol) and UDP-glucuronosyltransferase, and increase plasma levels of drugs metabolized by CYP2C19.

Interaction studies have been conducted with a number of common anticonvulsants. Carbamazepine reduces blood plasma concentrations of eslicarbazepine, probably because it induces glucuronidation. This drug combination also increased the risk for diplopia, impaired coordination and dizziness in a clinical study. Phenytoin also reduces eslicarbazepine plasma concentrations, which may be due to increased glucuronidation of eslicarbazepine; and concomitant administration results in an increase in phenytoin serum concentrations, which is probably due to inhibition of CYP2C19. Combinations with lamotrigine, topiramate, valproic acid or levetiracetam showed no significant interactions in studies, although eslicarbazepine has been shown to cause a minor reduction in lamotrigine levels.

== Pharmacology ==
=== Mechanism of action ===
The active component, eslicarbazepine, has the same mechanism of action as oxcarbazepine (which is a prodrug for licarbazepine, the racemate of eslicarbazepine) and most likely the closely related carbamazepine. It stabilises the inactive state of voltage-gated sodium channels, allowing for less sodium to enter neural cells, which leaves them less excitable. According to some sources, it has not been shown conclusively that this is the actual mechanism.

=== Pharmacokinetics ===
Eslicarbazepine acetate is absorbed to at least 90% from the gut, independently of food intake. It is quickly metabolised to eslicarbazepine, so that the original substance cannot be detected in the bloodstream. Peak plasma levels of eslicarbazepine are reached after 2–3 (1–4) hours, and plasma protein binding is somewhat less than 40%. Biological half-life is 10 to 20 hours, and steady-state concentrations are reached after four to five days after start of the treatment. Oxcarbazepine, for comparison, is also nearly completely absorbed from the gut, and peak plasma concentrations of licarbazepine are reached after 4.5 hours on average after oxcarbazepine intake. Plasma protein binding and half-life are of course the same.

Other metabolites of ESL are the less active (R)-(−)-licarbazepine (5%; the stereoisomer of eslicarbazepine), the pharmacologically active oxcarbazepine (1%), and inactive glucuronides of all of these substances. The drug is excreted mainly via the urine, of which two thirds are in the form of eslicarbazepine and one third in the form of eslicarbazepine glucuronide. The other metabolites only account for a few percent of the excreted drug.

=== Pharmacogenomics ===
Persons with certain genetic variations in human leukocyte antigens (HLAs) are under increased risk of developing skin reactions such as acute generalized exanthematous pustulosis (AGEP), but also severe ones such as Stevens–Johnson and DRESS syndrome, under treatment with carbamazepine and drugs with related chemical structures. This is true for the HLA-A*3101 allele, which occurs in 2 to 5% of Europeans and 10% of Japanese people, and the HLA-B*1502 allele, which is mainly found in people of Asian descent. Theoretically, this may also apply to ESL.

== Chemistry ==
As the name suggests, eslicarbazepine acetate is the acetate ester prodrug of eslicarbazepine. Eslicarbazepine itself is the pharmacologically more active of the two stereoisomers of licarbazepine. More specifically, it is (S)-(+)-licarbazepine.

Related drugs and active metabolites for comparison

Eslicarbazepine, the active metabolite of ESL

Oxcarbazepine

Licarbazepine, the active metabolite of oxcarbazepine

Carbamazepine

== History ==
Eslicarbazepine acetate was developed by the Portuguese pharmaceutical company Bial. In early 2009, Bial sold the marketing rights in Europe to the Japanese company Eisai. The drug was approved in the European Union in April 2009 under the trade names Zebinix and Exalief, but was marketed only under the first name. In the US it is marketed by Sunovion (formerly Sepracor) and was approved in November 2013.

In May 2025, the medication's primary US patents expired, and generic versions of the medication became available as a generic drug. This lowered the all-discounted retail cost from thousands of dollars to as little as $67.25 for the consumer - even more significant as alternative studied treatments such as trigeminal neuralgia are excluded from most US insurance coverage, due to Bial/Sunovion not submitting approval for additional treatments to the FDA.

== Research ==
Studies for the use of ESL as an anticonvulsant for children are under way as of 2016.

Like oxcarbazepine, ESL has potential uses for the treatment of trigeminal neuralgia and bipolar disorder. A 2015 assessment showed no statistical difference to placebo for the latter disorder.

== See also ==
- List of investigational bipolar disorder drugs
