= RAP-219 =

Clinical data
- Other names: RAP219; JNJ-64300912; JNJ64300912
- Routes of administration: Oral
- Drug class: AMPA receptor negative allosteric modulator

Pharmacokinetic data
- Protein binding: 98.8%
- Metabolism: Glucuronidation (UGT1A4), sulfation
- Elimination half-life: 278 hours

RAP-219, formerly known as JNJ-64300912, is an AMPA receptor negative allosteric modulator which is under development for the treatment of partial epilepsies, bipolar disorders, and neuropathic pain. It is taken orally. The drug acts specifically as a selective negative allosteric modulator of the transmembrane AMPA receptor regulatory protein (TARP) γ-8 and potently and selectively inhibits TARP γ-8-containing AMPA receptors. The time to peak levels of RAP-219 is approximately 4 hours and its elimination half-life is 278 hours. RAP-219 is under development by Rapport Therapeutics. As of May 2026, it is in phase 3 clinical trials for partial epilepsies, phase 2 trials for bipolar disorders, and phase 1 trials for neuropathic pain. The drug is an azabenzimidazole derivative of undisclosed chemical structure.

== See also ==
- List of investigational bipolar disorder drugs
