= N-Nitrosomorpholine =

N-nitrosomorpholine

Names
- Other names 4-nitrosomorpholine, alpha-acetoxy-N-nitrosomorpholine, nitrosomorpholine, NMOR, 4-nitroso-morpholine, NNM

Identifiers
CAS Number	59-89-2
3D model (JSmol)	Interactive image
ChEBI	CHEBI:76326
ChEMBL	ChEMBL165908
ChemSpider	5823
ECHA InfoCard	100.155.913
EC Number	627-564-6
KEGG	C19283
PubChem CID	6046
UNII	ARC64PKJ0F
UN number	2810 3077
CompTox Dashboard (EPA)	DTXSID4021056
- InChI: InChI=1S/C4H8N2O2/c7-5-6-1-3-8-4-2-6/h1-4H2 Key: ZKXDGKXYMTYWTB-UHFFFAOYSA-N
- SMILES: C1COCCN1N=O

Properties
Chemical formula	C_{4}H_{8}N_{2}O_{2}
Molar mass	116.120 g·mol^{−1}
Appearance	Pale yellow powder
Melting point	29 °C (84 °F; 302 K)
Boiling point	435 to 436 °F at 747 mmHg
Solubility in water	greater than or equal to 100 mg/mL in water at 66 °F

Hazards
- Occupational safety and health (OHS/OSH)
Main hazards	hepatocarcinogen
- Except where otherwise noted, data are given for materials in their standard state (at 25 °C [77 °F], 100 kPa). Infobox references

N-Nitrosomorpholine (NNM, NMOR) is an organic compound which is known to be a carcinogen and mutagen.

== Chemistry ==
NMOR is a pale yellow sand-like powder below 84°F. NMOR is most commonly produced from morpholine, but can also be made by the reaction of dimorpholinomethane in fuming nitric acid. Few reactions using NMOR as a starting material are reported in the organic synthesis literature, but it can be used as a precursor to a nitrogen-centered radical.

== Occurrence ==
NMOR is generally not used intentionally, but is instead created by the nitrosation of morpholine or morpholine derivatives which are used for several industrial purposes.

=== Rubber ===
2-(Morpholinothio)benzothiazole is used as an accelerator/stabilizer for vulcanization, or the manufacture of rubber products. It is the precursor to NMOR in the vulcanization process, as it is nitrosated by ambient sources of the nitro group present in the manufacturing process. As such, workers and others exposed to the rubber industry or its byproducts are exposed to higher levels of NMOR than the general population, raising their risk of cancer.

=== Tobacco products ===
NMOR is a component of tobacco products. As of 2014, detectable levels of NMOR are present in tobacco products in the United States and China. The presence of NMOR and other n-nitrosoamines is not limited to cigarettes, but is found in smokeless tobacco products (snuff tobacco, Snus, etc.) as well. Volatile nitrosamines, including NMOR, are detectable in the urine of tobacco smokers.

=== Food ===
Morpholine oleate is used in glazing wax which covers fruit. NMOR can be generated by the nitration of morpholine, causing its presence in waxed fruits.Health Canada, the Canadian governmental department of public health, has stated in 2002 that this does not pose a risk to human health.

Consumption of nitrate-rich diets is correlated with levels of salivary and urinary NMOR. The presence of NMOR can also be observed in gastric juices.

=== Other ===
NMOR has been found in several cosmetic products.

== Health hazards ==
The mechanisms of carcinogenesis are not completely clear in humans. NMOR and its metabolites may induce DNA damage by directly forming reactive oxygen species or compounds which crosslink DNA. In a rat model in 2013, it was observed that NMOR is hydroxylated, probably by a P450 enzyme, alpha to the N-nitroso moiety. This then decomposes into a diazonium-containing aldehyde which is capable of crosslinking DNA.

Endogenous synthesis from morpholine in the digestive system is observed. NMOR can be generated from N-nitrosating species formed by salivary nitrite and stomach acid, potentially leading to more damage in individuals with acid reflux. H. pylori does not induce NMOR formation in vitro, though this has yet to be confirmed in vivo.

NMOR is in fact used to generate liver cancer models in rats. Along with N-diethylnitrosamine, it is the gold standard for producing hepatocarcinoma with 100% lung metastasis.

== See also ==
- Nitrosamine
- N-Nitrosodiethylamine
- Hepatotoxicity
