= Sumitomo Pharma America =

Pharmaceutical company

Sumitomo Pharma America Inc.
- Formerly: Sepracor, Inc. (1984–2010); Sunovion Pharmaceuticals Inc. (2010–2023)
- Type: Subsidiary
- Traded as: Nasdaq: SEPR (1991–2009)
- Industry: Pharmaceuticals
- Predecessor: Sumitomo Pharma America Holdings; Sumitomo Pharma Oncology; Sumitovant Biopharma; Myovant Sciences; Urovant Sciences; Enzyvant Sciences
- Founded: 1984; 42 years ago (as Sepracor)
- Headquarters: Marlborough, Massachusetts, United States
- Key people: Tsutomu Nakagawa (President and CEO)
- Products: Latuda; Aptiom; Kynmobi; Lonhala Magnair; Lunesta
- Parent: Sumitomo Pharma
- Website: https://www.us.sumitomo-pharma.com

Sumitomo Pharma America Inc. is the American subsidiary of Japanese pharmaceutical company Sumitomo Pharma. It was originally founded in 1984 as Sepracor. In 2010, it was acquired by Sumitomo Dainippon Pharma as a standalone subsidiary and was renamed Sunovion Pharmaceuticals. In 2023, seven Sumitomo subsidiaries were restructured into Sunovion, which was subsequently renamed to Sumitomo Pharma America.

The corporation focuses on therapeutic areas of psychiatry and neurology, oncology, urology, and women's health.

== History ==
=== Sepracor ===
Sepracor, Inc. was founded in 1984 by Timothy J. Barberich, Steve Matson, and Bob Bratzler. Sepracor completed its initial public offering in 1991, trading on NASDAQ under the ticker SEPR. Sepracor completed its initial public offering in 1991 at a market cap of $160M. The company's initial focus was on the separation and purification of isomers and active metabolites. The strategy was to present larger pharmaceuticals with patented, purified active ingredients for expiring products. In 1993, Marion Merrell Dow, now a part of Sanofi, partnered with Sepracor to develop a purified version of its antihistamine, Seldane, after the latter was required to carry a warning about potentially fatal cardiac arrhythmia. This purified compound would later be marketed as Allegra, but Sepracor would not profit significantly from its launch, a result of less-than favorable partnership terms.

Sepracor's subsequent products were focused on the treatment of central nervous system and respiratory disorders, under the direction of Gunnar Aberg and John McCullough. The primary source of its revenue in the late 1990s – early 2000s was the approximately $600 million annually from its Xopenex franchise of drugs. The insomnia drug Lunesta (eszopiclone) was approved by the US Food and Drug Administration (FDA) in December 2004 and launched in April 2005. In 2006, the FDA approved Sepracor's drug Brovana to treat chronic obstructive pulmonary disease (COPD).

In 2008, Bial agreed with the company to produce and market its antiepileptic drug Aptiom at Sepracor's facilities and supervised by Bial. Aptiom subsequently received FDA approval in 2013 to treat partial onset seizures.

In 2010, Latuda, an atypical antipsychotic drug, received FDA approval for the treatment of schizophrenia and in 2013, received a secondary approval for the treatment of depressive episodes associated with Bipolar I disorder.

=== Acquisition by Sumitomo Dainippon Pharma and name change ===
Sepracor was acquired by then-Sumitomo Dainippon Pharma in 2010 for $2.6B. Sepracor would become an indirect, wholly owned subsidiary of Dainippon Sumitomo Pharma and renamed to Sunovion.

=== Corporate restructuring ===
On April 3, 2023, Sunovion Pharmaceuticals announced that it will combine with Sumitomo Pharma's other affiliate companies including Sumitomo Pharma America Holdings, Inc., Sumitovant Biopharma Ltd., Myovant Sciences, Inc., Urovant Sciences, Inc., Enzyvant Therapeutics, Inc., and Sumitomo Pharma Oncology, Inc. to form a single corporate entity under Sunovion. Sunovion would then be renamed Sumitomo Pharma America. The restructuring was completed on July 1, 2023.
