= Product pipeline =

A product pipeline is a series of products, either in a state of development, preparation, or production, developed and sold by a company, and ideally in different stages of their life cycle.

At any point in a company's life, the goal is to have some products in the growth stage, which is the key stage for establishing a product's position in a market, increasing sales, and improving profit margins; and the maturity stage, which is key to maintaining market share.

This term is particularly common in the pharmaceutical industry, where products can spend a decade or more in the pipeline.

== General Features ==
- Time constraints (because of first move advantage, patent expiration etc.)
- An element of risk and reward (weighing up potential profit against the cost of development)
- The use of raw materials and resources (to create the product)
- Often both capital and time intensive (High cost and lengthy development process)
- Tasks along the development process with a success and failure probabilities

== The Process ==
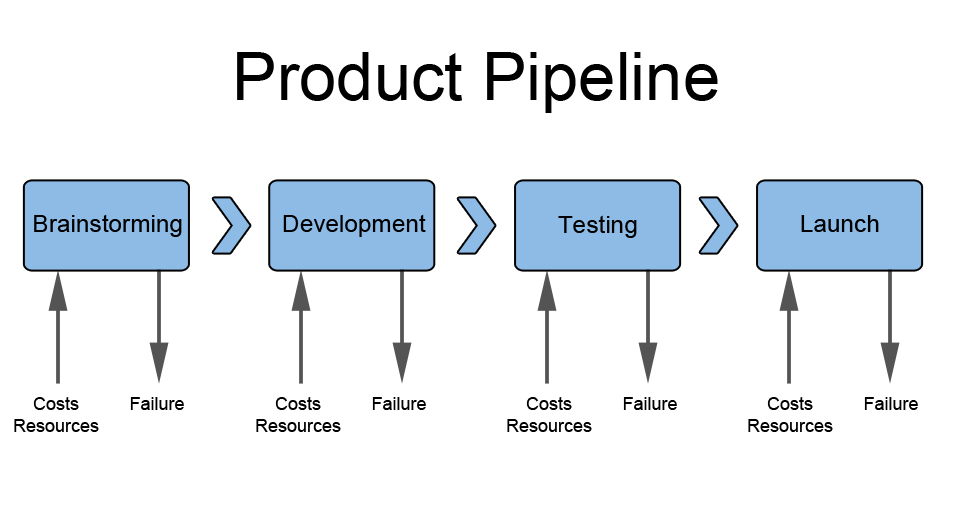
The main stages of the product pipeline.

=== Brainstorming ===
A product pipeline usually begins with brainstorming to come up with new ideas for possible products a firm can add to its product portfolio. The firm will seek to find a product that meets unmet demand in a market. Employees of the firm may meet to discuss new ideas, or may set out with the specific goal of discovering a new compound as is common in the pharmaceutical industry.

=== Development ===
Once brainstorming has yielded possible new products, the development stage begins. Different department may contribute at this point, aiding with the design, creation and analysis and of the new product. At any point along this stage the firm may decide is no longer worth pursuing a product or will face barriers in bringing the product to market and will drop funding for it, taking a loss. Possible reasons for this include the firm deciding the potential profits no longer being as great as they forecast government regulations or additional, unforeseen costs.

=== Testing ===
Once the product has been developed, the firm can test it. This often starts with small group testers, such as a focus group. If this initial testing proves successful, the firm will go on to use larger groups for a more reliable predictor of how the new product will be received by the public. This stage is also useful to the firm as a source of data and information about the product that it can use at a later date in marketing and promoting the product. If the product proves unpopular in testing, the firm is likely to change it, look at other ideas from the brainstorming or abandon the project.

=== Product Launch ===
If testing is successful, the end of the product pipeline is reached and the firm will then look to release the new product, at which point it will look at maximizing the products impact in the market through methods such as advertising.

== Benefits ==
Firms can benefit from having a product pipeline as it helps them predict their product portfolio and ensure they have enough products on the market to sustain the business.

In some industries, it is essential for survival to have a product pipeline. It is estimated that out of every 5000 new discoveries in the industry, only one to five get approved for human use, meaning firms must constantly be looking for new drugs to extend its product pipeline and ensure it has a product on the market providing income.

Having multiple products in the pipeline of similar type also gives firms a backup if the product they are focusing on fails. These similar products in early development can contribute to the development of the primary product in a pipeline, and can be used to extend the life cycle of the primary product through improvement and fresh patent protection.

== Example (Pharmaceutical industry) ==
One of the primary examples of product pipelines in action is in the pharmaceutical industry, where firms are constantly looking to develop new drugs for the market in order to maintain profitability.

In this industry, the product starts out at the brainstorming stage and only finishes when the new drug becomes FDA approved, at which point it can be released into the market. Pharmaceutical firms such as GlaxoSmithKline will often have many drugs in development stages, with relatively few making it to the end of the product pipeline. Only 32% of new drugs make it past phase 2 (when the drug is first tested on people with the disease).

Pharmaceutical firm’s product pipelines are also essential because they indicate to investors the firm’s potential and possible future profits. How many drugs and how far they are along the product pipeline will determine how easy a pharmaceutical firm can gain investment to continue research and development.

== See also ==
- Project portfolio management
- New product development
- Product life cycle
- System lifecycle
- Pharmaceutical industry
