= Zelquistinel =

Investigational antidepressant compound

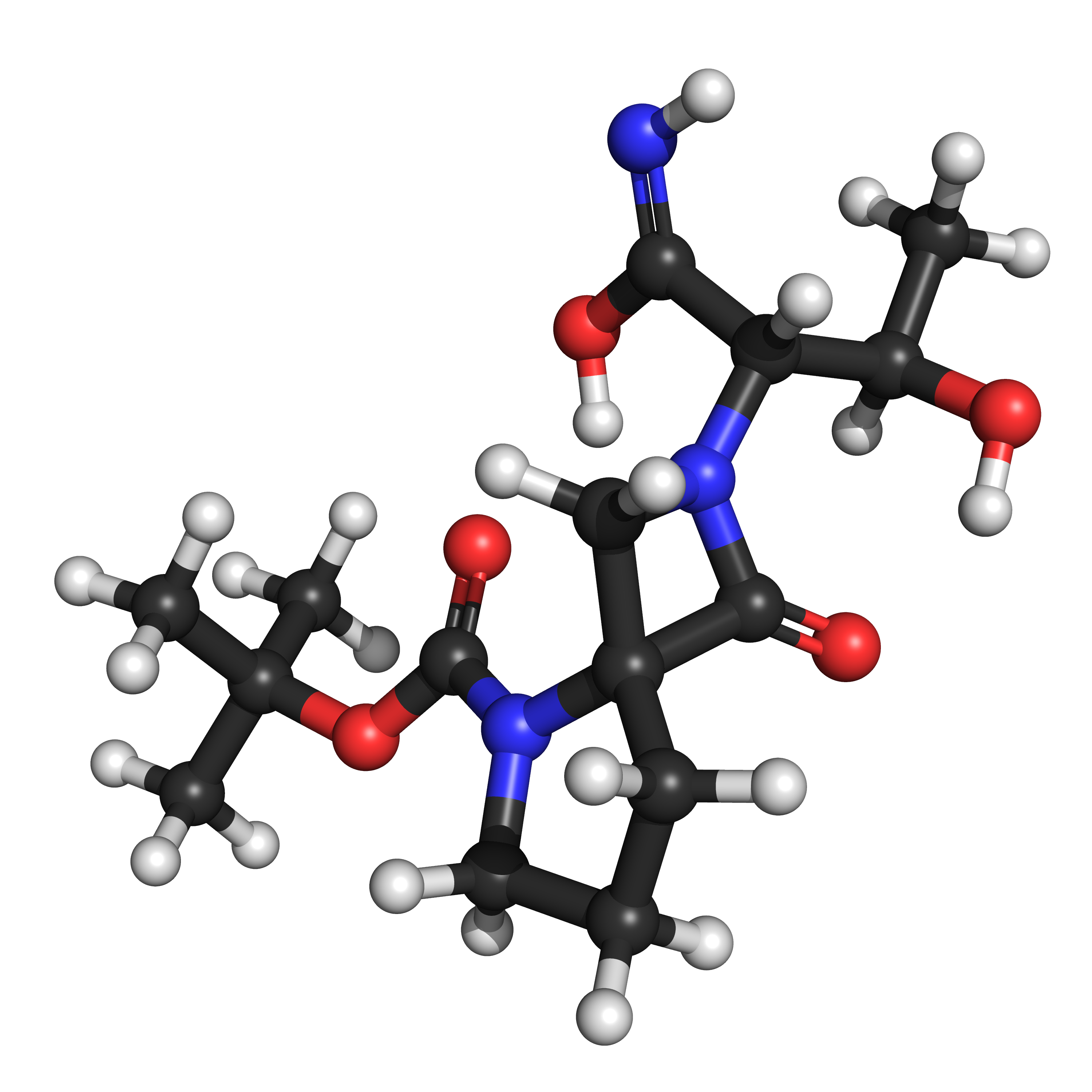
- Above: Zelquistinel structure Below: 3D representation of a zelquistinel molecule

Clinical data
- Routes of administration: By mouth
- Drug class: NMDA receptor positive allosteric modulator

Pharmacokinetic data
- Bioavailability: ~100%
- Elimination half-life: 1.2–2 hours

Identifiers
- IUPAC name: tert-butyl (4S)-2-[(2S,3R)-1-amino-3-hydroxy-1-oxobutan-2-yl]-3-oxo-2,5-diazaspiro[3.4]octane-5-carboxylate
- CAS Number: 2151842-64-5
- PubChem CID: 132155398
- ChemSpider: 81367638
- UNII: 387WYR6N95

Chemical and physical data
- Formula: C_{15}H_{25}N_{3}O_{5}
- Molar mass: 327.381 g·mol^{−1}
- 3D model (JSmol): Interactive image
- SMILES: C[C@H]([C@@H](C(=O)N)N1C[C@]2(C1=O)CCCN2C(=O)OC(C)(C)C)O
- InChI: InChI=1S/C15H25N3O5/c1-9(19)10(11(16)20)17-8-15(12(17)21)6-5-7-18(15)13(22)23-14(2,3)4/h9-10,19H,5-8H2,1-4H3,(H2,16,20)/t9-,10+,15+/m1/s1; Key:ABAPCYNTEPGBNJ-FTGAXOIBSA-N

Zelquistinel (GATE-251, formerly AGN-241751) is an orally active small-molecule NMDA receptor positive allosteric modulator which is under development for the treatment of major depressive disorder (MDD) by Syndeio Biosciences, and previously by Allergan.

== Pharmacology ==
Zelquistinel acts through a unique binding site on the NMDA receptor, independent of the glycine site, to positively modulate receptor activity and enhance NMDAR-mediated synaptic plasticity. Its mechanism of action is similar to that of rapastinel. However, unlike rapastinel, zelquistinel is orally bioavailable, exhibits increased potency, and has improved drug properties. The mean half-life of Zelquistinel is reported to be from 1.21 to 2.06 hours, reaching peak plasma concentrations 30 minutes after administration.

In preclinical studies, single doses of zelquistinel demonstrated both rapid-acting (24-hours) and sustained (1-week) antidepressant-like effects and enhancement of long-term synaptic plasticity.

== Clinical development ==
On July 23, 2018, the U.S. FDA granted Fast Track designation to the development of zelquistinel as an investigational new treatment for major depressive disorder.

In 2019, Allergan completed an exploratory phase IIa clinical trial of once-weekly oral zelquistinel in major depressive disorder. By week three, the two highest doses studied reduced MADRS depression scores by 9.5 and 10.6 points compared to a 7.7-point reduction with placebo. This result was considered statistically and clinically significant.

As of 2025, zelquistinel is undergoing a phase IIb clinical trial for depression sponsored by Syndeio Biosciences.

== See also ==
- List of investigational antidepressants
- List of investigational antipsychotics
- Apimostinel
