= Philippe Halfon =

Professor of Medicine

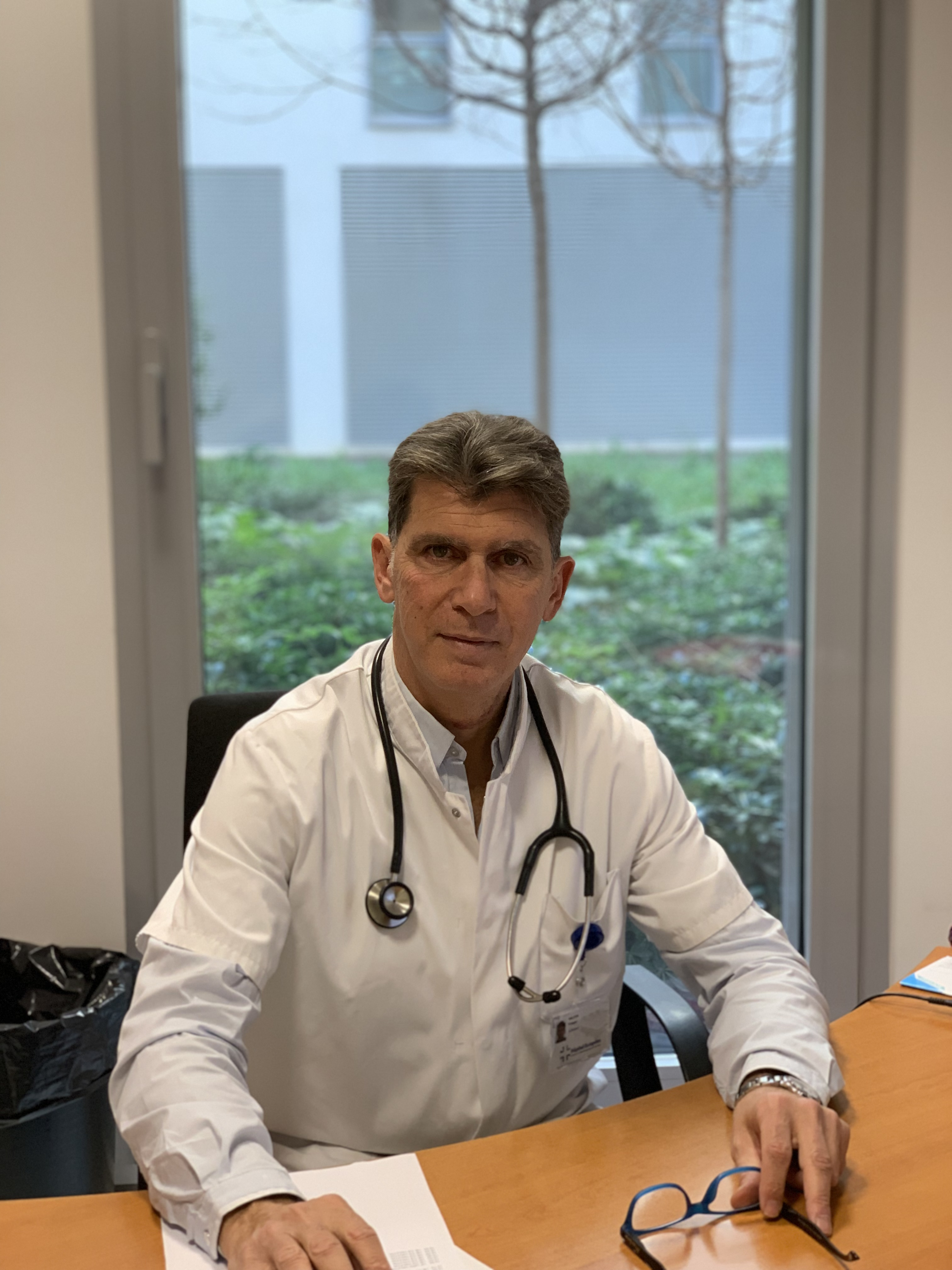
- Born: Tunis, Tunisia
- Occupations: Physician, researcher

Philippe Halfon is the Head of Internal Medicine and Infectious Disease at the Hôpital Européen de Marseille.

== Career ==
Halfon received a PharmD in 1984 and PhD in 1999 from Aix-Marseille University. He also holds an MD from the University of Medicine of Marseille in 2006. He has previously worked and studied at the associated medical centre at Aix-Marseille University, later working in Infectious Disease in Montreal, Canada.

He was previously appointed Research Director at Aix-Marseille University and an associate professor at Paris Hospital College. He was also a visiting Professor of Medicine at Emory University, United States, and Hadassah Medical Centre, Israel. His research focuses on cancer and virology, including SARS-CoV-2, and he has published on these topics.

Halfon is also the co-founder of biomedical sector companies Alphabio Clinical Laboratories, and Genoscience Pharma, for which he is also the CEO.
