= Malonamide =

- Structural formula

Names
- IUPAC name Propanediamide
- Other names: Malonamide; Malondiamide; Malonodiamide

Identifiers
CAS Number	108-13-4
3D model (JSmol)	Interactive image
ChEBI	CHEBI:48537
ECHA InfoCard	100.003.231
EC Number	203-553-8
PubChem CID	7911
UNII	QVQ8CNG255
CompTox Dashboard (EPA)	DTXSID1040116
- InChI: InChI=1S/C3H6N2O2/c4-2(6)1-3(5)7/h1H2,(H2,4,6)(H2,5,7) Key: WRIRWRKPLXCTFD-UHFFFAOYSA-N
- SMILES: C(C(=O)N)C(=O)N

Properties
Chemical formula	C_{3}H_{6}N_{2}O_{2}
Molar mass	102.093 g·mol^{−1}
Density	1.430 g/cm^{3} (Monoclinic)
Melting point	171–173 °C (340–343 °F; 444–446 K)

Hazards
- GHS labelling
Pictograms	(GHS07: Exclamation mark)
Signal word	Warning
Hazard statements	H315, H319, H335
Precautionary statements	P261, P264, P264+P265, P271, P280, P302+P352, P304+P340, P305+P351+P338, P319, P321, P332+P317, P337+P317, P362+P364, P403+P233, P405, P501
- Except where otherwise noted, data are given for materials in their standard state (at 25 °C [77 °F], 100 kPa). Infobox references

Malonamide is an organic compound with the formula C_{3}H_{6}N_{2}O_{2} or H_{2}N–C(=O)–CH_{2}–C(=O)–NH_{2}. It is classified as amide.
