= Licarbazepine =

Active metabolite of oxcarbazepine

- Top: (R)-(−)-licarbazepine; Bottom: (S)-(+)-licarbazepine

Clinical data
- ATC code: None

Pharmacokinetic data
- Protein binding: <40%
- Metabolites: Glucuronides
- Excretion: Mainly renal

Identifiers
- IUPAC name: (RS)-10,11-Dihydro-10-hydroxy-5H-dibenz[b,f]azepine-5-carboxamide
- CAS Number: 29331-92-8
- PubChem CID: 114709
- ChemSpider: 102704
- UNII: XFX1A5KJ3V
- KEGG: D09215
- ChEMBL: ChEMBL1067
- CompTox Dashboard (EPA): DTXSID50865484
- ECHA InfoCard: 100.122.427

Chemical and physical data
- Formula: C_{15}H_{14}N_{2}O_{2}
- Molar mass: 254.289 g·mol^{−1}
- 3D model (JSmol): Interactive image
- Chirality: Racemic mixture
- SMILES: NC(=O)N1c2ccccc2CC(O)c3ccccc13
- InChI: InChI=1S/C15H14N2O2/c16-15(19)17-12-7-3-1-5-10(12)9-14(18)11-6-2-4-8-13(11)17/h1-8,14,18H,9H2,(H2,16,19); Key:BMPDWHIDQYTSHX-UHFFFAOYSA-N

Licarbazepine is a voltage-gated sodium channel blocker with anticonvulsant and mood-stabilizing effects that is related to oxcarbazepine. It is an active metabolite of oxcarbazepine. In addition, an enantiomer of licarbazepine, eslicarbazepine ((S)-(+)-licarbazepine), is an active metabolite of eslicarbazepine acetate. Oxcarbazepine and eslicarbazepine acetate are inactive on their own, and behave instead as prodrugs to licarbazepine and eslicarbazepine, respectively, to produce their therapeutic effects.

== See also ==
- List of investigational bipolar disorder drugs
