= Cycloserine =

Tuberculosis medication

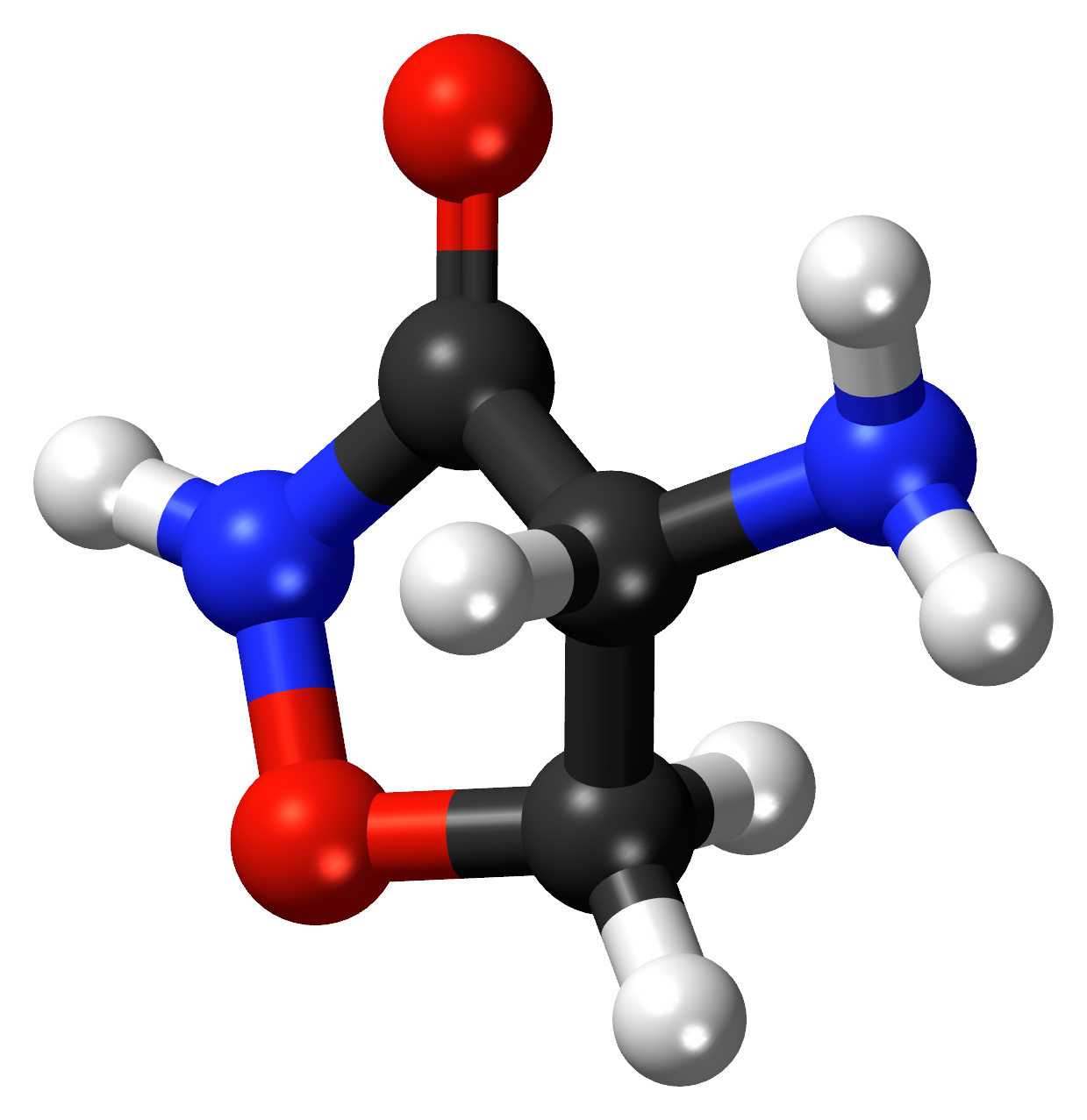

Clinical data
- Trade names: Seromycin
- Other names: d-cycloserine, 4-amino-3-isoxazolidinone
- AHFS/Drugs.com: Monograph
- License data: US DailyMed: Seromycin
- Routes of administration: Oral
- Drug class: Antibiotic; Alanine racemase inhibitor; D-Alanine–D-alanine ligase inhibitor; NMDA receptor partial agonist; GABA-T inhibitor
- ATC code: J04AB01 (WHO)

Legal status
- Legal status: US: ℞-only

Pharmacokinetic data
- Bioavailability: ~70% to 90%
- Metabolism: Liver
- Elimination half-life: 10 hours (normal kidney function)
- Excretion: Kidney

Identifiers
- IUPAC name: (R)-4-Amino-1,2-oxazolidin-3-one
- CAS Number: 68-41-7
- PubChem CID: 6234
- DrugBank: DB00260
- ChemSpider: 5998
- UNII: 95IK5KI84Z
- KEGG: D00877
- ChEBI: CHEBI:40009
- ChEMBL: ChEMBL771
- NIAID ChemDB: 007654
- CompTox Dashboard (EPA): DTXSID8022870
- ECHA InfoCard: 100.000.626

Chemical and physical data
- Formula: C_{3}H_{6}N_{2}O_{2}
- Molar mass: 102.093 g·mol^{−1}
- 3D model (JSmol): Interactive image
- Melting point: 155 to 156 °C (311 to 313 °F) (dec.)
- SMILES: O=C1NOC[C@H]1N
- InChI: InChI=1S/C3H6N2O2/c4-2-1-7-5-3(2)6/h2H,1,4H2,(H,5,6)/t2-/m1/s1; Key:DYDCUQKUCUHJBH-UWTATZPHSA-N

Cycloserine, sold under the brand name Seromycin, is a broad-spectrum antibiotic used as a second-line treatment for advanced tuberculosis and, rarely, urinary tract infections (UTIs). Specifically, it is used in conjunction with other antituberculosis medications for the treatment of active drug resistant tuberculosis. Cycloserine's use for the treatment of UTIs is similarly alternative, with the drug being primarily reserved for when conventional therapies have failed and antimicrobial susceptibility is demonstrated. It is administered orally.

Cycloserine is a structural analogue of the amino acid D-alanine and works by inhibiting bacterial cell wall synthesis. As cycloserine is able to penetrate the central nervous system, it may cause side effects including headaches, drowsiness, depression, dizziness, vertigo, confusion, paresthesias, dysarthria, hyperirritability, psychosis, convulsions, and shaking (tremors). Overdose of cycloserine may result in paresis, seizures, and coma, while alcohol consumption may increase the risk of seizures. Coadministration of pyridoxine, or vitamin B6, may reduce the incidence of some CNS-related side effects. Cycloserine is not recommended for those with kidney failure, epilepsy, depression, or alcoholism. While animal studies have shown adverse effects, it is unknown if cycloserine use during pregnancy poses a developmental risk to human fetuses.

Derived simultaneously by Eli Lilly and Merck from Streptomyces in 1954, Cycloserine was widely used in the 1950s and 1960s as a primary treatment for acute UTIs and tuberculosis. Upon the discovery of its neuropsychiatric side effects, usage decreased dramatically beginning in the 1970s. Cycloserine is classified as a Group B agent for the treatment of multidrug-resistant tuberculosis by the World Health Organization, a classification that defines it as a "conditionally recommended [agent] of second choice." Additionally, it is on the World Health Organization's List of Essential Medicines. Cycloserine has received some research interest from the field of psychiatry, most notably in the formulation of cycloserine/lurasidone as a treatment for bipolar depression and suicidal ideation.

== Medical uses ==
=== Tuberculosis ===
Cycloserine is used primarily for the treatment of multidrug-resistant (MDR-TB) and extensively drug-resistant (XDR-TB) strains of M. tuberculosis, remaining a second- or third-line of treatment for the condition due to its significant neurological and psychological side effects. Cycloserine is always used as part of a multidrug regimen. Because the drug leaves users susceptible to high blood concentrations and systemic toxicity, users require frequent renal, hepatic and hematologic laboratory monitoring.

=== Urinary tract infections ===
Cycloserine has demonstrated clinical efficacy against multi-drug resistant urinary pathogens, being approved for the treatment of acute UTIs caused by E. coli and Enterobacter species. Additionally, cycloserine has shown in vitro activity against drug-resistant strains of Pseudomonas aeruginosa, Klebsiella pneumoniae and Acinetobacter baumannii. Cycloserine's use in treating UTIs is extremely uncommon both due to its comparatively lower efficacy against traditional antibiotics, as well as its significant neurological and psychological side effects. Consequently, it is treated as a drug of last resort, used when other primary options have been exhausted.

== Pharmacology ==
=== Mechanism of action ===
Cycloserine works as an antibiotic by inhibiting cell-wall biosynthesis in bacteria. As a cyclic analogue of D-alanine, cycloserine acts against two crucial enzymes important in the cytosolic stages of peptidoglycan synthesis: alanine racemase (Alr) and D-alanine:D-alanine ligase (Ddl). The first enzyme is a pyridoxal 5'-phosphate-dependent enzyme which converts the L-alanine to the D-alanine form. The second enzyme is involved in joining two of these D-alanine residues together by catalyzing the formation of the ATP-dependent D-alanine-D-alanine dipeptide bond between the resulting D-alanine molecules. If both of these enzymes are inhibited, then D-alanine residues cannot form and previously formed D-alanine molecules cannot be joined. This effectively leads to inhibition of peptidoglycan synthesis.

Psychiatric use is suggested based on partial NMDA receptor agonism, which improves neural plasticity in lab animals. The degree of clinical usefulness is, as aforementioned, unclear and still being explored, as of 2016.

L-Cycloserine is known to act as a GABA transaminase inhibitor (GABA-T inhibitor) and to have anticonvulsant effects.

== Chemistry ==
=== Chemical properties ===
Under mildly acidic conditions, cycloserine hydrolyzes to give hydroxylamine and D-serine. Cycloserine can be conceptualized as a cyclized version of serine, with an oxidative loss of dihydrogen to form the nitrogen-oxygen bond.

Cycloserine is stable under basic conditions, with the greatest stability at pH = 11.5.

=== Synthesis ===
Initial approaches to synthesize the compound was first published in 1955, when the Stammer group produced a racemic synthesis from dl‐β‐aminoxyalanine ethyl ester. In 1957, Platter et al. managed to synthesis the pure D-enantiomer by cyclizing the corresponding α‐amino‐β‐chlorohydroxamic acids. Chemical synthesis of the compound was revolutionized in the 2010s, when several approaches starting with the cheap d-serine (mirror form of normal L-serine) were published by different groups.

The biosynthesis of the compound is defined by a ten-gene cluster. l-serine and l-arginine are converted to O-ureido-l-serine, flipped to O-ureido-d-serine, then turned into the final compound by cyclization. In 2013, Uda et al. successfully used recombinant versions of three enzymes in the cluster to produce the compound.

A 1963 patent describes industrial production of the drug by bacterial fermentation. It is unclear what process is used in the 21st century, fermentation, or chemical synthesis.

== History ==
The compound was first isolated nearly simultaneously by two teams. Workers at Merck isolated the compound, which they called oxamycin, from a species of Streptomyces. The same team prepared the molecule synthetically. Workers at Eli Lilly isolated the compound from strains of Streptomyces orchidaceus. It was shown to hydrolyze to serine and hydroxylamine.

== Society and culture ==
=== Economics ===
In the U.S., the price of cycloserine increased from $500 for 30 pills to $10,800 in 2015 after the Chao Center for Industrial Pharmacy and Contract Manufacturing changed ownership to Rodelis Therapeutics in August 2015.

The price increase was rescinded after the previous owner, the Purdue University Research Foundation, which retained "oversight of the manufacturing operation" intervened and Rodelis returned the drug to an NGO of Purdue University. The foundation now will charge $1,050 for 30 capsules, twice what it charged before". Eli Lilly has been criticised for not ensuring that the philanthropic initiative continued. Due to US antitrust laws, however, no company may control the price of a product after it is outlicensed.

In 2015, the cost in the United States was increased to US$3,150 a month and then decreased to US$1,050 per month.

== Research ==
=== Psychiatric disorders ===
A 2015 Cochrane review found no evidence of benefit in anxiety disorders as of 2015. Another review found preliminary evidence of benefit. Evidence for use in addiction is tentative but also unclear.

Reviews in 2016–2017 found that cycloserine produced a small improvement in cognitive behavioral therapy for anxiety, obsessive–compulsive disorder (OCD), and post-traumatic stress disorder, and had potential for use as a therapy in psychiatric disorders. Adding D-cycloserine to exposure therapy did not improve results over exposure therapy alone in a 2025 meta-analysis of children and teenagers with OCD.

Recent research has investigated the use of cycloserine for augmentation of transcranial magnetic stimulation in the treatment of depression, based on its putative effects as a neuroplastogen. Preliminary studies have found adding cycloserine improves response and remission rates compared to rTMS alone.

=== Possible hallucinogenic effects ===
Cycloserine is closely structurally related to muscimol, a GABA_{A} receptor agonist and hallucinogen found in Amanita muscaria. It has been said to produce effects in humans, including mental confusion, acute psychosis, convulsions, and other abnormal behavioral states, which are reminiscent of those of muscimol.
