= NMDA receptor modulator =

NMDA receptor modulators (glutamate modulators) are a new form of antipsychotic that are in Phase II FDA studies. The first compound studied was glycine which was hypothesized by Daniel Javitt after observation that people with phencyclidine(PCP)-induced psychosis were lacking in glutamate transmission. (PCP is an NMDA receptor antagonist that blocks glutamate.) In giving glycine to people with PCP-induced psychosis a recovery rate was noted. From there, it was hypothesized that people with psychosis from schizophrenia would benefit from increased glutamate transmission and glycine was added with strong recovery rates noted especially in the area of negative and cognitive symptoms. Glycine, however, sporadic results aside (dose 60 g/day or 0.8 g/kg, approximately the amount in 300 g of gelatin powder or two kilograms of sunflower seeds) remains an adjunct antipsychotic and an unworkable compound. However, the Eli Lilly and Company study drug LY-2140023 is being studied as a primary antipsychotic and is showing strong recovery rates, especially in the area of negative and cognitive symptoms of schizophrenia. Tardive dyskinesia, diabetes and other standard complications have not been noted:

Treatment with LY2140023, like treatment with olanzapine, was safe and well-tolerated; treated patients showed statistically significant improvements in both positive and negative symptoms of schizophrenia compared to placebo (P = 0.001 at week 4). Notably, patients treated with LY-2140023 did not differ from placebo-treated patients with respect to prolactin elevation, extrapyramidal symptoms or weight gain. These data suggest that mGlu2/3 receptor agonists have antipsychotic properties and may provide a new alternative for the treatment of schizophrenia.

Other NMDA receptor modulators are being studied and this modality of treatment may once approved as antipsychotic medications gradually replace the current (dopaminergic) antipsychotics.

Summary of NMDA receptor modulators in clinical development
Drug name	Mechanism	Indication	Trial phase & status	Citation
Onfasprodil (MIJ821)	Selective NR2B negative allosteric modulator	Treatment-resistant depression	Phase 2 proof-of-concept NCT03756129	
Zelquistinel	Oral allosteric modulator	Depression (rapid-acting antidepressant)	Early clinical trials NCT03726658, NCT03586427	
Radiprodil	Negative allosteric modulator targeting GluN2B	GRIN-related neurodevelopmental disorder; tuberous sclerosis complex; focal cortical dysplasia	Phase 1b/2a ongoing; Phase 3 planned — GRIN-NDD NCT05818943; NCT06392009	
RS-D7	NMDA receptor modulator via D-amino acid oxidase inhibition	Multiple system atrophy (MSA)	Proof-of-concept/early clinical development — a Phase 2 MSA study is listed for YA-101 (also known as RS-D7): NCT06848231	

== See also ==
- Single-dose long-acting CNS drug
