= Tiapride =

Antipsychotic medication

Clinical data
- Trade names: Tiapridal
- Routes of administration: Oral (tablets), IM, IV
- ATC code: N05AL03 (WHO)

Legal status
- Legal status: BR: Class C1 (Other controlled substances); In general: ℞ (Prescription only)

Pharmacokinetic data
- Bioavailability: ~75% (oral) (T_{max} = 1 hour)
- Protein binding: Negligible
- Elimination half-life: 2.9–3.6 hours
- Excretion: Urine (70% as unchanged tiapride)

Identifiers
- IUPAC name: N-[2-(diethylamino)ethyl]-2-methoxy-5-methylsulfonylbenzamide
- CAS Number: 51012-32-9
- PubChem CID: 5467
- ChemSpider: 5268
- UNII: LAH70H9JPH
- KEGG: D08590
- ChEMBL: ChEMBL84158
- CompTox Dashboard (EPA): DTXSID0023664
- ECHA InfoCard: 100.051.717

Chemical and physical data
- Formula: C_{15}H_{24}N_{2}O_{4}S
- Molar mass: 328.43 g·mol^{−1}
- 3D model (JSmol): Interactive image
- SMILES: CCN(CC)CCNC(=O)C1=C(C=CC(=C1)S(=O)(=O)C)OC

Tiapride is a drug that selectively blocks D_{2} and D_{3} dopamine receptors in the brain. It is used to treat a variety of neurological and psychiatric disorders including dyskinesia, alcohol withdrawal syndrome, negative symptoms of psychosis, and agitation and aggression in the elderly. A derivative of benzamide, tiapride is chemically and functionally similar to other benzamide antipsychotics such as sulpiride and amisulpride known for their dopamine antagonist effects.

== Medical uses ==
=== Alcoholism ===
Research in animal models and clinical studies in alcoholic patients have found that tiapride has anxiolytic effects. Dopamine hyperactivity has been linked with alcohol withdrawal syndrome (AWS), suggesting that tiapride's antidopaminergic effects are the most likely mechanism for its clinical efficacy, although others believe some other mechanism might be involved. Alcoholic patients treated with tiapride at a dosage of 300 mg/day reported reduced psychological distress and improved abstinence from alcohol. In another study in which alcoholic patients were given titrated doses up to 800 mg/day, subjects showed significant improvements in ratings of withdrawal, craving, psychiatric symptoms and quality of life.

While tiapride does not affect positive symptoms of psychosis such as hallucinosis or delirium sometimes manifested in alcohol withdrawal syndrome, if combined with a drug such as carbamazepine that addresses those symptoms, it is ideal for treating alcohol dependency because its metabolism does not depend on liver function and it has low potential for abuse. This sets it apart from the benzodiazepines, which are contraindicated with alcohol and can be addictive. Moreover, tiapride's rapid onset makes intravenous or intramuscular injection prior to or during withdrawal episodes particularly effective.

=== Agitation and aggression ===
Agitation and aggression are also associated with hyperdopaminergic activity. Antipsychotic drugs are the most common treatment for these symptoms, but often come with a host of side-effects including orthostatic hypotension and deficits in vigilance and attention. One clinical study in agitated elderly patients compared the effects of tiapride, haloperidol and placebo and found that while the two drugs had comparable efficacy superior to the placebo effect, tiapride had fewer and less severe side effects than haloperidol.

Tiapride's selectivity for the limbic system, which is associated with emotion, could underlie its particular efficacy in treating these affective disorders. Moreover, its selectivity for the dopaminergic system is thought to account for its avoidance of the side effects typically associated with other neuroleptic drugs, such as chlorpromazine, which act on a number of neurotransmitter systems.

=== Movement disorders ===
While tiapride preferentially targets the limbic system over the striatum, its moderate antagonistic effect on striatal dopamine receptors makes it effective in treating motor deficits that involve this area, such as tardive dyskinesia and chorea. Tiapride's moderate efficacy at D_{2} receptors may explain why it is able to treat motor symptoms without the extrapyramidal symptoms caused by excess dopamine blockage, which are sometimes seen in haloperidol or chlorpromazine. One clinical study of patients with tardive dyskinesia associated with Parkinson's disease found that tiapride significantly improved motor abilities without affecting other parkinsonian symptoms.

== Side effects ==
Although it is considered a "safe" medicine, it is, like sulpiride, strictly contraindicated for patients under the age of 18 due to its effects during the process of puberty. This is likely related to its side effects on levels of the hormone prolactin, which is involved in sexual development. There are also insufficient clinical data on the other side effects in adolescents.

Tiapride has been found to cause excess prolactin levels in plasma, which can cause decreased libido, infertility and increased risk of breast cancer. This is because dopamine plays a primary role in regulating prolactin release by binding to D_{2} receptors on prolactin-secreting cells in the anterior pituitary. Thus, when tiapride blocks these receptors these cells are disinhibited and release more prolactin.

The side-effect reported most commonly to the U.S. Food and Drug Administration (FDA) is rhabdomyolysis, a condition characterized by muscle tissue breakdown. Cardiac abnormalities such as prolongation of the QT interval and torsades de pointes have also been observed.

Dosages above approximately 300 mg/day risk inducing tardive dyskinesia. However, given the drug's fairly wide window of tolerable doses, dosages can often be titrated to obtain the desired effect without bringing about motor deficits. In general, tiapride is considered an atypical antipsychotic because of its low risk for extrapyramidal symptoms, such as akinesia and akathisia. These effects are thought to be reduced in tiapride relative to typical antipsychotics because of its selectivity for the limbic system over extrapyramidal areas that control movement.

== Pharmacodynamics ==
Tiapride is a dopamine D_{2} and D_{3} receptor antagonist. It is more selective than other neuroleptic drugs such as haloperidol and risperidone, which not only target four of the five known dopamine receptor subtypes (D_{1-4}), but also block serotonin (5-HT_{2A, 2C}), α_{1}- and α_{2}-adrenergic, and histamine H1 receptors. Compared to these drugs, tiapride has a relatively moderate affinity for its target receptors, displacing 50 percent of ^{3}H-raclopride binding at a concentration of 320 nM at D_{2} receptors and a concentration of 180 nM at D_{3} receptors.

Tiapride displays a relatively high regional selectivity for limbic areas. One study found that, in contrast with haloperidol, which displays equal affinity for receptors in the rat limbic system and striatum, tiapride shows over three times as much affinity for limbic areas than striatal areas. Another study in rats found tiapride's affinity for the septum, a limbic region, to be over thirty times as high as for the striatum.

Efficacy at the D_{2} receptor is moderate, with 80 percent of receptors occupied even in the presence of excess tiapride concentrations.

== Pharmacokinetics ==
Tiapride is primarily taken orally in the form of a tablet, but can also be administered via intravenous or intramuscular injection. A liquid oral formulation is also available for elderly patients with difficulty chewing solids. For all three methods of administration, the bioavailability of tiapride is approximately 75 percent. Peak plasma concentrations are attained between 0.4 and 1.5 hours following administration, and steady-state concentrations achieved 24 to 48 hours after beginning administration 3 times a day. It distributes rapidly and exhibits virtually no binding to plasma proteins, giving it a relatively high volume of distribution. Benzamide and its derivatives are highly water-soluble, and because of their polarity are believed to cross the blood–brain barrier via carrier-mediated transport. Elimination of tiapride, mostly in its original form, occurs through renal excretion with a half-life of 3 to 4 hours.

Recommended dosages of tiapride vary with clinical symptoms. In alcoholic patients, delirium or pre-delirium associated with alcohol withdrawal can be alleviated by administration of 400–1200 mg/day or up to 1800 mg/day if necessary. Tremors and other dyskinsias can be treated with 300–800 mg/day. For reducing agitation and aggression in elderly patients, 200–300 mg/day is recommended.

== Availability ==
Tiapride is marketed under various trade names and is widely available outside of the United States. The most common trade name for tiapride is Tiapridal, which is used throughout Europe, Russia, as well as parts of South America, the Middle East, and North Africa. It is also sold under different names in Italy (Italprid, Sereprile), Japan (Tialaread, Tiaryl, Tiaprim, Tiaprizal), Chile (Sereprid), Germany (Tiaprid, Tiapridex), and China (Tiapride).

== See also ==
- Amisulpride
- Levosulpiride
- Nemonapride
- Remoxipride
- Sulpiride
- Sultopride
- Veralipride
