= Levosulpiride =

Dopamine antagonist medication

Clinical data
- Trade names: Dislep, Sulpepta, others
- Other names: L-Sulpiride; S-(–)-Sulpiride; RV-12309
- Routes of administration: Oral
- ATC code: N05AL07 (WHO)

Identifiers
- IUPAC name: N-[[(2S)-1-ethylpyrrolidin-2-yl]methyl]-2-methoxy-5-sulfamoylbenzamide
- CAS Number: 23672-07-3
- PubChem CID: 688272
- IUPHAR/BPS: 958
- DrugBank: DB16021
- ChemSpider: 599749
- UNII: JTG7R315LK
- KEGG: D07312
- ChEBI: CHEBI:64119
- ChEMBL: ChEMBL267044
- CompTox Dashboard (EPA): DTXSID0042583

Chemical and physical data
- Formula: C_{15}H_{23}N_{3}O_{4}S
- Molar mass: 341.43 g·mol^{−1}
- 3D model (JSmol): Interactive image
- SMILES: CCN1CCC[C@H]1CNC(=O)C2=C(C=CC(=C2)S(=O)(=O)N)OC
- InChI: InChI=1S/C15H23N3O4S/c1-3-18-8-4-5-11(18)10-17-15(19)13-9-12(23(16,20)21)6-7-14(13)22-2/h6-7,9,11H,3-5,8,10H2,1-2H3,(H,17,19)(H2,16,20,21)/t11-/m0/s1; Key:BGRJTUBHPOOWDU-NSHDSACASA-N

Levosulpiride, sold under the brand names Dislep and Sulpepta among others, is a dopamine antagonist medication which is used in the treatment of psychotic disorders like schizophrenia, major depressive disorder, nausea and vomiting, and gastroparesis. It is taken by mouth.

It is a selective antagonist of the dopamine D_{2} receptor and an agonist of the serotonin 5-HT_{4} receptor. Chemically, it is a benzamide and the (S)-(−)-enantiomer of sulpiride.

Levosulpiride is marketed widely throughout the world, including in Europe, South Korea, Latin America, India, and Pakistan. It is not available in the United States or the United Kingdom.

== Medical uses ==
Levosulpiride is used in the treatment of:

- Psychosis
- Negative symptoms of schizophrenia
- Major depressive disorder
- Anxiety disorders
- Dysthymia
- Vertigo
- Nausea and vomiting
- Gastroparesis
- Dyspepsia
- Irritable bowel syndrome
- Premature ejaculation

Levosulpiride is not currently licensed for treatment of premature ejaculation in the United Kingdom or other European countries.

== Side effects ==
Side effects of levosulpiride include amenorrhea, gynecomastia, galactorrhea, changes in libido, and neuroleptic malignant syndrome. In the United States, as of 2013 only one case of adverse reaction to levosulpiride had been recorded on the FDA Adverse Event Reporting System Database. A case of rapid-onset resistant dystonia caused by low-dose levosulpiride was reported in India.

== Pharmacology ==
=== Pharmacodynamics ===
Levosulpiride is a selective dopamine D_{2} receptor antagonist. The drug has also been found to act as a moderate agonist of the serotonin 5-HT_{4} receptor. It is said to have antipsychotic, antidepressant, antiemetic, and gastroprokinetic effects.

== Chemistry ==
Levosulpiride is a substituted benzamide derivative. It is the levorotatory enantiomer of sulpiride. Other benzamide derivatives include amisulpride, metoclopramide, tiapride, sultopride, and veralipride, among others.
