= C17H27N3O4S =

The molecular formula C_{17}H_{27}N_{3}O_{4}S may refer to:

- Amisulpride
- SEP-4199
