= ENX-104 =

Experimental antidepressant drug

Clinical data
- Other names: ENX104; Deuterated nemonapride enantiomer
- Routes of administration: Oral
- Drug class: Dopamine D_{2} and D_{3} autoreceptor antagonist

Identifiers
- IUPAC name: 5-chloro-N-[(2S,3S)-1-[dideuterio(phenyl)methyl]-2-methylpyrrolidin-3-yl]-2-methoxy-4-(trideuteriomethylamino)benzamide
- CAS Number: 2950168-16-6
- PubChem CID: 169797611

Chemical and physical data
- Formula: C_{21}H_{21}ClD_{5}N_{3}O_{2}
- Molar mass: 392.94 g·mol^{−1}
- 3D model (JSmol): Interactive image
- SMILES: [2H]C([2H])([2H])NC1=CC(OC)=C(C(N[C@@H](CC2)[C@H](C)N2C([2H])([2H])C3=CC=CC=C3)=O)C=C1Cl
- InChI: InChI=1S/C21H26ClN3O2/c1-14-18(9-10-25(14)13-15-7-5-4-6-8-15)24-21(26)16-11-17(22)19(23-2)12-20(16)27-3/h4-8,11-12,14,18,23H,9-10,13H2,1-3H3,(H,24,26)/t14-,18-/m0/s1/i2D3,13D2; Key:KRVOJOCLBAAKSJ-KBBDZWSESA-N

ENX-104, also known as deuterated nemonapride enantiomer, is a selective dopamine D_{2} and D_{3} receptor antagonist which is under development for the treatment of major depressive disorder. It is specifically under development for the treatment of major depressive disorder characterized by anhedonia. The drug is being developed for use at low doses to preferentially block presynaptic dopamine D_{2} and D_{3} autoreceptors and hence to enhance rather than inhibit dopaminergic neurotransmission. It is taken by mouth.

== Pharmacology ==
=== Pharmacodynamics ===
ENX-104 is intended for use at low doses to produce preferential presynaptic dopamine D_{2} and D_{3} autoreceptor antagonism and consequent enhancement of dopaminergic neurotransmission. The target occupancy of the dopamine D_{2} and D_{3} receptors is approximately 40 to 70%. For comparison, dopamine D_{2} receptor occupancy of 65 to 80% is associated with antipsychotic-like effects and hence with substantial postsynaptic dopamine D_{2} receptor antagonism in animals. ENX-104 has been found to increase dopamine and serotonin levels in the nucleus accumbens and prefrontal cortex. It was also found to augment amphetamine-induced dopamine release. In accordance with these findings, the drug was found to produce anti-anhedonia-like effects, specifically increased reward responsiveness, in animals. Low doses of amisulpride likewise showed anti-anhedonia-like effects.

ENX-104 is not expected to induce motor side effects like extrapyramidal symptoms (EPS) or catalepsy at the low doses employed, as these effects require higher occupancy of the D_{2} receptor (e.g., ~80%).

ENX-104 is highly potent as a dopamine receptor antagonist. Its affinities are 0.01 nM for the dopamine D_{2L} receptor, 0.1 nM for the dopamine D_{2S} receptor, 0.2 nM for the dopamine D_{3} receptor (2- to 20-fold lower than for the D_{2} receptor), and 1.6 nM for the dopamine D_{4} receptor (8- to 160-fold lower than for the D_{2} receptor). The drug is also a weak partial agonist or antagonist of the serotonin 5-HT_{2A} receptor, with an EC_{50} of 14 nM (70- to 1,400-fold lower than its affinity for the D_{2} receptor) and an E_{max} of approximately 40%. Conversely, ENX-104 showed little or no functional activity at the serotonin 5-HT_{1A} or 5-HT_{7} receptor.

== Chemistry ==
ENX-104 is a benzamide derivative. It is a partially-deuterated analog of the drug nemonapride, which is used to treat schizophrenia.

== Clinical trials ==
As of September 2024, ENX-104 is in phase 1 clinical trials for major depressive disorder. It is under development by Engrail Therapeutics.

== See also ==
- List of investigational antidepressants
- ENX-105 and ENX-205
