= Benzamide =

- Skeletal formula

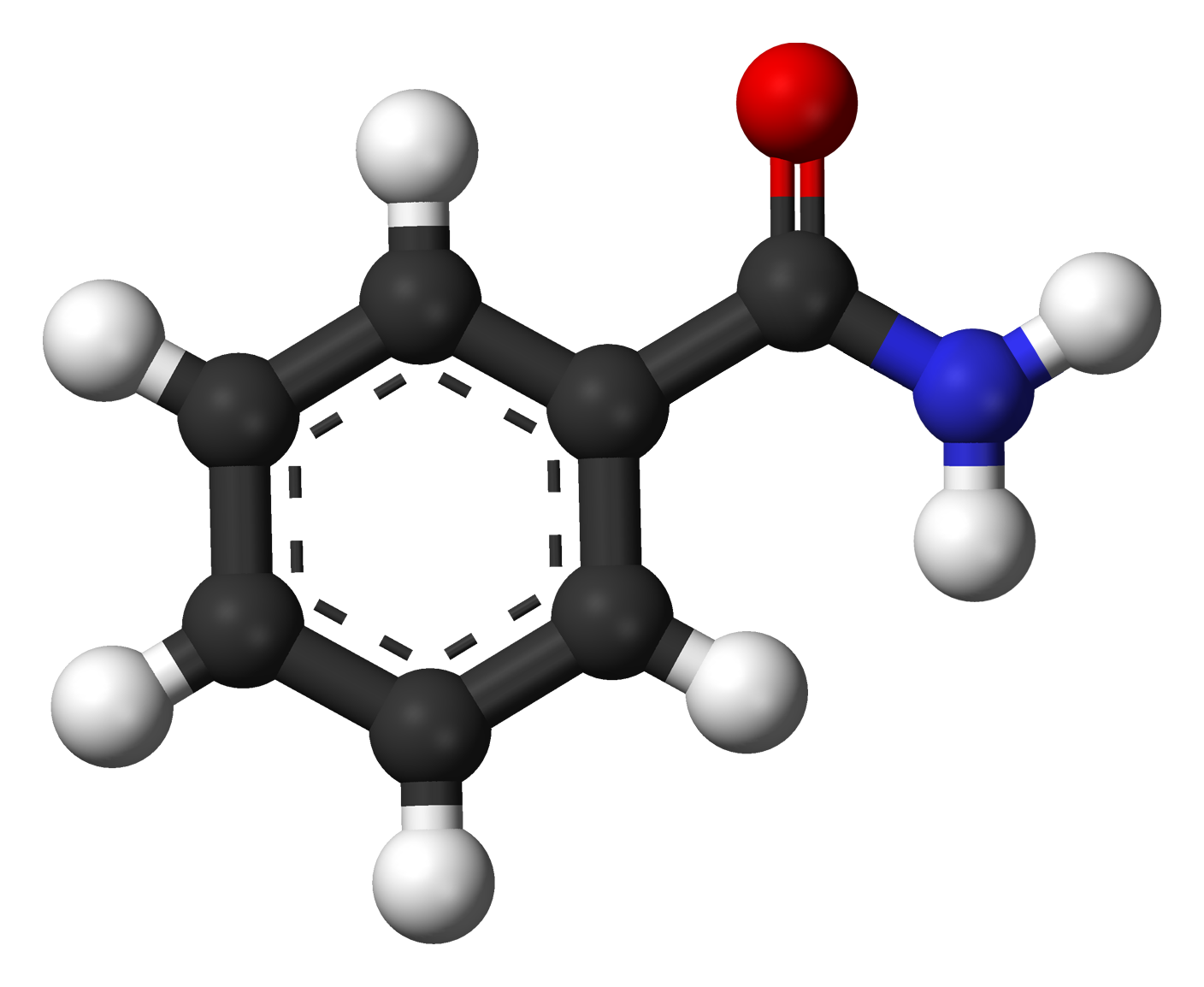
- Ball-and-stick model

Names
- Preferred IUPAC name Benzamide
- Systematic IUPAC name Benzenecarboxamide
- Other names Benzoic acid amide Phenyl carboxamide Benzoylamide

Identifiers
CAS Number	55-21-0
3D model (JSmol)	Interactive image; Interactive image
Beilstein Reference	385876
ChEBI	CHEBI:28179
ChEMBL	ChEMBL267373
ChemSpider	2241
ECHA InfoCard	100.000.207
EC Number	200-227-7
KEGG	C09815
PubChem CID	2331
RTECS number	CU8700000
UNII	6X80438640
CompTox Dashboard (EPA)	DTXSID0021709
- InChI: InChI=1S/C7H7NO/c8-7(9)6-4-2-1-3-5-6/h1-5H,(H2,8,9) Key: KXDAEFPNCMNJSK-UHFFFAOYSA-N; InChI=1/C7H7NO/c8-7(9)6-4-2-1-3-5-6/h1-5H,(H2,8,9) Key: KXDAEFPNCMNJSK-UHFFFAOYAA
- SMILES: O=C(N)c1ccccc1; c1ccc(cc1)C(=O)N

Properties
Chemical formula	C_{7}H_{7}NO
Molar mass	121.139 g·mol^{−1}
Appearance	Off-white solid
Density	1.341 g/cm^{3}
Melting point	127 to 130 °C (261 to 266 °F; 400 to 403 K)
Boiling point	288 °C (550 °F; 561 K)
Solubility in water	13.5 g/L (at 25°C)
Acidity (pK_{a})	approx. 13 (in H_{2}O); 23.3 (in DMSO)
Magnetic susceptibility (χ)	−72.3·10^{−6} cm^{3}/mol

Pharmacology
ATC code	N05AL (WHO)

Hazards
- GHS labelling
Pictograms	(GHS07: Exclamation mark) (GHS08: Health hazard)
Signal word	Warning
Hazard statements	H302, H341
Precautionary statements	P201, P202, P264, P270, P281, P301+P312, P308+P313, P330, P405, P501
NFPA 704 (fire diamond)	1 1 0
Flash point	180 °C (356 °F; 453 K)
Autoignition temperature	> 500 °C (932 °F; 773 K)
- Except where otherwise noted, data are given for materials in their standard state (at 25 °C [77 °F], 100 kPa). verify (what is ?) Infobox references

Benzamide is an organic compound with the chemical formula of C_{7}H_{7}NO. It is the simplest amide derivative of benzoic acid. In powdered form, it appears as a white solid, while in crystalline form, it appears as colourless crystals. It is slightly soluble in water, and soluble in many organic solvents. It is a natural alkaloid found in the herbs of Berberis pruinosa.

== Properties ==
Benzamide is slightly soluble in water and soluble in polar organic solvents, including ethanol, diethyl ether, and chloroform. It has a melting point of 127–130 °C and a boiling point of 288 °C. The molecule consists of a phenyl group attached to a carboxamide group. Resonance stabilization between the carbonyl oxygen, the nitrogen atom, and the aromatic ring influences its reactivity and dipole moment.

== Applications ==
=== Pharmaceuticals ===
Substituted benzamides form a major class of pharmacological compounds, designated as benzamides. Derivatives of this structural pharmacophore exhibit varied biological activities:

- Antipsychotics: Sulpiride, amisulpride, and tiapride act as dopamine receptor antagonists.
- Gastroprokinetics and Antiemetics: Metoclopramide and domperidone are widely used to treat nausea and gastrointestinal disorders.
- Oncology: Benzamide derivatives, such as olaparib and entinostat, function as PARP inhibitors and histone deacetylase (HDAC) inhibitors, respectively.

=== Chemical Synthesis ===
Benzamide serves as a synthetic intermediate in industrial chemical manufacturing for dyes, agricultural chemicals, and specialty polymers.

=== List of Derivatives ===
Analgesics

- Ethenzamide
- Salicylamide

Antidepressants

- Moclobemide

Antiemetics/Prokinetics

- Alizapride
- Batanopride
- Bromopride
- Cinitapride
- Cisapride
- Clebopride
- Dazopride
- Itopride
- Metoclopramide
- Mosapride
- Prucalopride
- Renzapride
- Trimethobenzamide
- Veralipride
- Zacopride

Antipsychotics

- Azapride
- Amisulpride
- Levosulpiride
- Nemonapride
- Remoxipride
- Sulpiride
- Sultopride
- Tiapride
- Raclopride

Opioids

- AH-7921
- Bromadoline
- U-47700
- U-77891

Pesticides

- Isocycloseram
- Fluopicolide

Others

- 3-Aminobenzamide
- Alpiropride
- Aminohippuric acid
- Chidamide
- Entinostat
- Eticlopride
- Imatinib
- Mocetinostat
- Procarbazine
- Sunifiram

== Toxicity and Safety ==
Benzamide is classified as harmful if swallowed (LD50 oral, mouse: ~1,160 mg/kg). It is listed as a Category 2 suspect germ cell mutagen based on in vitro assay data. Exposure to benzamide dust may cause mild physical irritation to the skin, eyes, and upper respiratory tract. Elevated temperatures or combustion generate toxic fumes, including nitrogen oxides and carbon monoxide.
