= Amisulpride =

Atypical antipsychotic and antiemetic medication

Clinical data
- Trade names: Socian, Barhemsys, others
- Other names: Aminosultopride; AST; APD-421; APD421; APD-403; APD403; DAN-2163; DAN2163
- AHFS/Drugs.com: Monograph
- License data: US DailyMed: Amisulpride; US FDA: Barhemsys
- Pregnancy category: AU: C
- Routes of administration: By mouth, intravenous
- Drug class: Dopamine D_{2} and D_{3} receptor antagonist; Serotonin 5-HT_{2B} and 5-HT_{7} receptor antagonist; Antipsychotic; Antidepressant; Antiemetic
- ATC code: N05AL05 (WHO)

Legal status
- Legal status: AU: S4 (Prescription only); BR: Class C1 (Other controlled substances); UK: POM (Prescription only); US: ℞-only

Pharmacokinetic data
- Bioavailability: 48%
- Protein binding: 16%
- Metabolism: Liver (minimal; most excreted unchanged)
- Elimination half-life: 12 hours
- Excretion: Kidney (23–46%), Faecal

Identifiers
- IUPAC name: (RS)-4-amino-N-[(1-ethylpyrrolidin-2-yl)methyl]-5-ethylsulfonyl-2-methoxybenzamide
- CAS Number: 71675-85-9
- PubChem CID: 2159
- IUPHAR/BPS: 963
- DrugBank: DB06288
- ChemSpider: 2074
- UNII: 8110R61I4U
- KEGG: D07310
- ChEBI: CHEBI:64045
- ChEMBL: ChEMBL243712
- CompTox Dashboard (EPA): DTXSID5042613
- ECHA InfoCard: 100.068.916

Chemical and physical data
- Formula: C_{17}H_{27}N_{3}O_{4}S
- Molar mass: 369.48 g·mol^{−1}
- 3D model (JSmol): Interactive image
- SMILES: O=S(=O)(c1cc(c(OC)cc1N)C(=O)NCC2N(CC)CCC2)CC
- InChI: InChI=1S/C17H27N3O4S/c1-4-20-8-6-7-12(20)11-19-17(21)13-9-16(25(22,23)5-2)14(18)10-15(13)24-3/h9-10,12H,4-8,11,18H2,1-3H3,(H,19,21); Key:NTJOBXMMWNYJFB-UHFFFAOYSA-N

Amisulpride, sold under the brand names Socian and Barhemsys, is a medication used in the treatment of schizophrenia, acute psychotic episodes, depression, and nausea and vomiting. It is specifically used at lower doses intravenously to prevent and treat postoperative nausea and vomiting, at low doses by mouth to treat depression, and at higher doses by mouth to treat psychosis.

It is usually classed with the atypical antipsychotics. Chemically it is a benzamide and like other benzamide antipsychotics, such as sulpiride, it is associated with a high risk of elevating blood levels of the lactation hormone, prolactin (thereby potentially causing the absence of the menstrual cycle, breast enlargement, even in males, breast milk secretion not related to breastfeeding, impaired fertility, impotence, breast pain, etc.), and a low risk, relative to the typical antipsychotics, of causing movement disorders.

Amisulpride is indicated for use in the United States in adults for the prevention of postoperative nausea and vomiting (PONV), either alone or in combination with an antiemetic of a different class; and to treat PONV in those who have received antiemetic prophylaxis with an agent of a different class or have not received prophylaxis.

Amisulpride is believed to work by blocking, or antagonizing, the dopamine D_{2} receptor, reducing its signalling. The effectiveness of amisulpride in treating dysthymia and the negative symptoms of schizophrenia is believed to stem from its blockade of the presynaptic dopamine D_{2} and D_{3} autoreceptors. These presynaptic receptors regulate the release of dopamine into the synapse, so by blocking them amisulpride increases dopamine concentrations in the synapse. This increased dopamine concentration is theorized to act on dopamine D_{1} receptors to relieve depressive symptoms (in dysthymia) and the negative symptoms of schizophrenia.

It was introduced by Sanofi-Aventis in the 1990s. Its patent expired by 2008, and generic formulations became available. It is marketed in all English-speaking countries except for Canada.

== Medical uses ==
=== Schizophrenia ===
Although according to other studies it appears to have comparable efficacy to olanzapine in the treatment of schizophrenia, amisulpride augmentation, similarly to sulpiride augmentation, has been considered a viable treatment option (although this is based on low-quality evidence) in clozapine-resistant cases of schizophrenia. Another recent study concluded that amisulpride is an appropriate first-line treatment for the management of acute psychosis.

=== Depression ===
Amisulpride is approved and used at low doses in the treatment of dysthymia and major depressive disorder. Whereas typical doses used in schizophrenia block postsynaptic dopamine D_{2}-like receptors and reduce dopaminergic neurotransmission, low doses of amisulpride preferentially block presynaptic dopamine D_{2} and D_{3} autoreceptors and thereby disinhibit dopamine release and enhance dopaminergic neurotransmission. A 2010 Cochrane review found that low-dose amisulpride was effective in the treatment of dysthymia. Likewise, a 2024 literature review found that low-dose amisulpride was effective for dysthymia. The drug is approved for depression specifically in Italy, Greece, and certain other European countries.

=== Postoperative nausea and vomiting ===
Amisulpride is indicated for use in the United States in adults for the prevention of postoperative nausea and vomiting (PONV), either alone or in combination with an antiemetic of a different class; and to treat PONV in those who have received antiemetic prophylaxis with an agent of a different class or have not received prophylaxis.

=== Available forms ===
Amisulpride is available in the form of 100, 200, and 400 mg oral tablets. In the United States, it is available in the form of a 5 mg/2 mL (2.5 mg/mL) solution for intravenous administration.

== Contraindications ==
Amisulpride's use is contraindicated in the following disease states and populations

- Pheochromocytoma
- Concomitant prolactin-dependent tumours e.g. prolactinoma, breast cancer
- Movement disorders (e.g. Parkinson's disease and dementia with Lewy bodies)
- Lactation
- Children before the onset of puberty

Neither is it recommended to use amisulpride in patients with hypersensitivities to amisulpride or the excipients found in its dosage form.

== Adverse effects ==
The adverse effect frequencies listed below are when prescribed as an antipsychotic, at much higher doses than are used to treat depression and nausea and vomiting.

Very Common (≥10% incidence)

- Extrapyramidal side effects (EPS; including dystonia, tremor, akathisia, parkinsonism).

Common (≥1%, <10% incidence)

- Insomnia
- Somnolence
- Hypersalivation
- Nausea
- Headache
- Hyperactivity
- Vomiting
- Hyperprolactinaemia (which can lead to galactorrhoea, breast enlargement and tenderness, sexual dysfunction, etc.)
- Weight gain (produces less weight gain than chlorpromazine, clozapine, iloperidone, olanzapine, paliperidone, quetiapine, risperidone, sertindole, zotepine and more (although not statistically significantly) weight gain than haloperidol, lurasidone, ziprasidone and approximately as much weight gain as aripiprazole and asenapine)
- Anticholinergic side effects (although it does not bind to the muscarinic acetylcholine receptors and hence these side effects are usually quite mild) such as

- constipation
- dry mouth
- disorder of accommodation
- Blurred vision
Rare (<1% incidence)

- Hyponatraemia
- Bradycardia
- Hypotension
- Palpitations
- Urticaria
- Seizures
- Mania
- Oculogyric crisis
- Tardive dyskinesia
- Blood dyscrasias such as leucopenia, neutropenia and agranulocytosis
- QT interval prolongation (in a recent meta-analysis of the safety and efficacy of 15 antipsychotic drugs amisulpride was found to have the 2nd highest effect size for causing QT interval prolongation)

Hyperprolactinaemia results from antagonism of the D_{2} receptors located on the lactotrophic cells found in the anterior pituitary gland. Amisulpride has a high propensity for elevating plasma prolactin levels as a result of its poor blood–brain barrier penetrability and hence the resulting greater ratio of peripheral D_{2} occupancy to central D_{2} occupancy. This means that to achieve the sufficient occupancy (~60–80%) of the central D_{2} receptors in order to elicit its therapeutic effects a dose must be given that is enough to saturate peripheral D_{2} receptors including those in the anterior pituitary.

=== Discontinuation ===
The British National Formulary recommends a gradual withdrawal when discontinuing antipsychotics to avoid acute withdrawal syndrome or rapid relapse. Symptoms of withdrawal commonly include nausea, vomiting, and loss of appetite. Other symptoms may include restlessness, increased sweating, and trouble sleeping. Less commonly there may be a feeling of the world spinning, numbness, or muscle pains. Symptoms generally resolve after a short period of time.

There is tentative evidence that discontinuation of antipsychotics can result in transient withdrawal related rebound psychosis. It may also result in reoccurrence of the condition that is being treated. Rarely tardive dyskinesia can occur when the medication is stopped.

== Overdose ==
Torsades de pointes is common in overdose. Amisulpride is moderately dangerous in overdose (with the TCAs being very dangerous and the SSRIs being modestly dangerous).

== Interactions ==
Amisulpride should not be used in conjunction with drugs that prolong the QT interval (such as citalopram, bupropion, clozapine, tricyclic antidepressants, sertindole, ziprasidone, etc.), as this can cause potential life threatening arrhythmias (Torsades de pointes, Ventricular tachycardia, and Ventricular fibrillation)

== Pharmacology ==
=== Pharmacodynamics ===
Amisulpride
Site	K_{i} (nM)	Species	Ref
SERT	10000+	Human	
NET	10000+	Human	
DAT	10000+	Human	
5-HT_{1A}	10000+	Human	
5-HT_{1B}	1744	Human	
5-HT_{1D}	1341	Human	
5-HT_{1E}	10000+	Human	
5-HT_{2A}	8304	Human	
5-HT_{2B}	13	Human	
5-HT_{2C}	10000+	Human	
5-HT_{3}	10000+	Human	
5-HT_{5A}	10000+	Human	
5-HT_{6}	4154	Human	
5-HT_{7}	11.5	Human	
α_{1A}	10000+	Human	
α_{1B}	10000+	Human	
α_{1D}	10000+	Human	
α_{2A}	1114	Human	
α_{2C}	1540	Human	
β_{1}	10000+	Human	
β_{2}	10000+	Human	
β_{3}	10000+	Human	
D_{1}	10000+	Human	
D_{2}	3.0	Human	
D_{3}	3.5	Rat	
D_{4}	2369	Human	
D_{5}	10000+	Human	
H_{1}	10000+	Human	
H_{2}	10000+	Human	
H_{4}	10000+	Human	
M_{1}	10000+	Human	
M_{2}	10000+	Human	
M_{3}	10000+	Human	
M_{4}	10000+	Human	
M_{5}	10000+	Human	
σ_{1}	10000+	Rat	
σ_{2}	10000+	Rat	
MOR	10000+	Human	
DOR	10000+	Human	
KOR	10000+	Human	
GHB^{High}	50 (IC_{50})	Rat	
NMDA (PCP)	10000+	Rat	
Values are K_{i} (nM). The smaller the value, the more strongly the drug binds to the site.

Amisulpride functions primarily as a dopamine D_{2} and D_{3} receptor antagonist. It has high affinity for these receptors with dissociation constants of 3.0 and 3.5 nM, respectively. Although standard doses used to treat psychosis inhibit dopaminergic neurotransmission, low doses preferentially block inhibitory presynaptic autoreceptors. This results in a facilitation of dopamine activity, and for this reason, low-dose amisulpride has also been used to treat dysthymia.

Amisulpride and its relatives sulpiride, levosulpiride, and sultopride have been shown to bind to the high-affinity GHB receptor at concentrations that are therapeutically relevant (IC_{50} = 50 nM for amisulpride).

Amisulpride, sultopride and sulpiride respectively present decreasing in vitro affinities for the D_{2} receptor (IC_{50} = 27, 120 and 181 nM) and the D_{3} receptor (IC_{50} = 3.6, 4.8 and 17.5 nM).

Though it was long widely assumed that dopaminergic modulation is solely responsible for the respective antidepressant and antipsychotic properties of amisulpride, it was subsequently found that the drug also acts as a potent antagonist of the serotonin 5-HT_{7} receptor (K_{i} = 11.5 nM). Several of the other atypical antipsychotics such as risperidone and ziprasidone are potent antagonists at the 5-HT_{7} receptor as well, and selective antagonists of the receptor show antidepressant properties themselves. To characterize the role of the 5-HT_{7} receptor in the antidepressant effects of amisulpride, a study prepared 5-HT_{7} receptor knockout mice. The study found that in two widely used rodent models of depression, the tail suspension test, and the forced swim test, those mice did not exhibit an antidepressant response upon treatment with amisulpride. These results suggest that 5-HT_{7} receptor antagonism mediates the antidepressant effects of amisulpride.

Amisulpride also appears to bind with high affinity to the serotonin 5-HT_{2B} receptor (K_{i} = 13 nM), where it acts as an antagonist. The clinical implications of this, if any, are unclear. In any case, there is no evidence that this action mediates any of the therapeutic effects of amisulpride.

Amisulpride shows stereoselectivity in its actions. Aramisulpride ((R)-amisulpride) has higher affinity for the 5-HT_{7} receptor (K_{i} = 47 nM vs. 1,900 nM) while esamisulpride ((S)-amisulpride) has higher affinity for the D_{2} receptor (4.0 nM vs. 140 nM).

=== Pharmacokinetics ===
The oral bioavailability of amisulpride is 48%. Its plasma protein binding is 16%. The drug is metabolized by the liver but its metabolism is minimal. Its elimination half-life is 12 hours. Amisulpride is eliminated in urine (23–46%) and feces and is excreted mostly unchanged.

== Chemistry ==
Amisulpride is a benzamide derivative. It is structurally related to other benzamide dopamine receptor antagonists employed as antipsychotics and antiemetics including levosulpiride, metoclopramide, nemonapride, remoxipride, sulpiride, sultopride, tiapride, and veralipride. Chemically, it is also known as aminosultopride, differing from sultopride only in possessing an amino substituent on its benzene ring.

== History ==
Amisulpride was introduced by Sanofi-Aventis in the 1990s. Its patent expired by 2008, and generic formulations became available.

=== United States clinical development ===
The U.S. Food and Drug Administration (FDA) approved a 10 mg/4mL amisulpride IV formulation for use in post-operative nausea based on evidence from four clinical trials of 2323 subjects undergoing surgery or experiencing nausea and vomiting after the surgery. The trials were conducted at 80 sites in the United States, Canada and Europe.

Two trials (Trials 1 and 2) enrolled subjects scheduled to have surgery. Subjects were randomly assigned to receive either amisulpride or a placebo drug at the beginning of general anesthesia. In Trial 1, subjects received amisulpride or placebo alone, and in Trial 2, they received amisulpride or placebo in combination with one medication approved for prevention of nausea and vomiting. Neither the subjects nor the health care providers knew which treatment was being given until after the trial was complete.

The trials counted the number of subjects who had no vomiting and did not use additional medications for nausea or vomiting in the first day (24 hours) after the surgery. The results then compared amisulpride to placebo.

The other two trials (Trials 3 and 4) enrolled subjects who were experiencing nausea and vomiting after surgery. In Trial 3, subjects did not receive any medication to prevent nausea and vomiting before surgery and in Trial 4 they received the medication, but the treatment did not work. In both trials, subjects were randomly assigned to receive either amisulpride or placebo. Neither the subjects nor the health care providers knew which treatment was being given until after the trial was complete.

The trials counted the number of subjects who had no vomiting and did not use additional medications for nausea or vomiting in the first day (24 hours) after the treatment. The trial compared amisulpride to placebo.

The FDA has not approved amisulpride for use in any psychiatric indication. LB Pharmaceuticals is developing N-methyl amisulpride for the use in the treatment of schizophrenia; a Phase 2 first-in-patient study is planned for 2023.

== Society and culture ==
=== Brand names ===
Brand names include: Amazeo, Amipride (AU), Amival, Deniban, Solian (AU, IE, RU, UK, ZA), Soltus, Sulpitac (IN), Sulprix (AU), Midora (RO) and Socian (BR, PT).

=== Availability ===
Amisulpride is not approved by the Food and Drug Administration for use in the United States in psychiatric indications, but it is approved and in use throughout Europe, Asia, Mexico, New Zealand and Australia to treat psychosis and schizophrenia.

An IV formulation of Amisulpride was approved for the treatment of postoperative nausea and vomiting ("PONV") in the United States in February 2020.

== Research ==
=== Bipolar depression ===
SEP-4199 (non-racemic amisulpride), an 85:15 ratio of aramisulpride ((R)-amisulpride) to esamisulpride ((S)-amisulpride), which is theorized to provide more balanced serotonin 5-HT_{7} and dopamine D_{2} receptor antagonism than racemic amisulpride (a 50:50 ratio of its (R)- and (S)-enantiomers), is or was under development by Sunovion Pharmaceuticals for the treatment of bipolar depression in the United States and other countries. However, its development may have been discontinued.

=== Chemotherapy-induced nausea and vomiting ===
The intravenous formulation of amisulpride approved for treatment of postoperative nausea and vomiting is additionally under development for the treatment of chemotherapy-induced nausea and vomiting.

=== Chemical derivatives ===
A more lipophilic and centrally permeable derivative of amisulpride, N-methylamisulpride (developmental code name LB-102), is under development by LB Pharmaceuticals for the treatment of schizophrenia in the United States and other countries.

== See also ==
- ENX-104 (an analogue under development for use at low doses to treat depression)
