= C17H25N3O5S =

The molecular formula C_{17}H_{25}N_{3}O_{5}S (molar mass: 383.46 g/mol, exact mass: 383.1515 u) may refer to:

- Meropenem
- Veralipride
