= Azapride =

Chemical compound

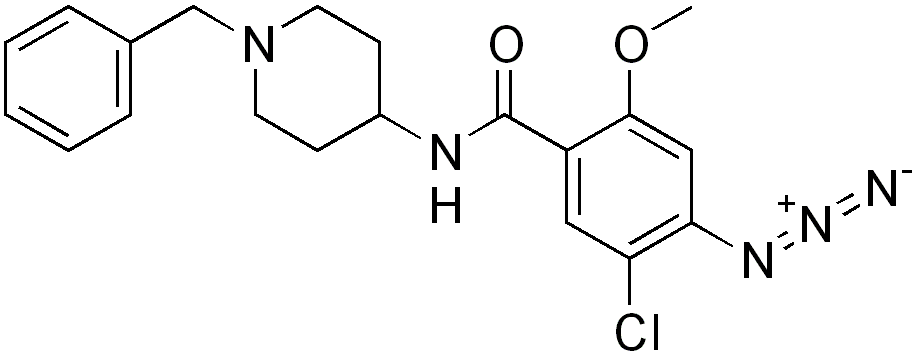

Clinical data
- Other names: Azidoclebopride
- ATC code: None

Identifiers
- IUPAC name: 4-Azido-5-chloro-2-methoxy-N-[1-(phenylmethyl)piperidin-4-yl]benzamide
- CAS Number: 92990-90-4
- PubChem CID: 3036441
- ChemSpider: 2300456
- UNII: URS8YWT9Q7
- CompTox Dashboard (EPA): DTXSID00239217

Chemical and physical data
- Formula: C_{20}H_{22}ClN_{5}O_{2}
- Molar mass: 399.88 g·mol^{−1}
- 3D model (JSmol): Interactive image
- SMILES: Clc1cc(c(OC)cc1/N=[N+]=[N-])C(=O)NC3CCN(Cc2ccccc2)CC3
- InChI: InChI=1S/C20H22ClN5O2/c1-28-19-12-18(24-25-22)17(21)11-16(19)20(27)23-15-7-9-26(10-8-15)13-14-5-3-2-4-6-14/h2-6,11-12,15H,7-10,13H2,1H3,(H,23,27); Key:CKKHIIXHAWWTNP-UHFFFAOYSA-N

Azapride is the azide derivative of the dopamine antagonist clebopride synthesized in order to label dopamine receptors. It is an irreversible dopamine antagonist.
