= Alpiropride =

Antimigraine agent

Clinical data
- Trade names: Revistel, Rivistel, or Rivestel
- Other names: Iristel; RIV-2093; RIV2093; RIV 2093; Riv 2093; Riv-2093; Riv2093
- Drug class: Dopamine D_{2} receptor antagonist; Antihypertensive agent; Antimigraine agent

Identifiers
- IUPAC name: 4-amino-2-methoxy-5-(methylsulfamoyl)-N-[(1-prop-2-enylpyrrolidin-2-yl)methyl]benzamide
- CAS Number: 81982-32-3
- PubChem CID: 71253
- ChemSpider: 64384
- UNII: 1768UW0XS1
- ChEBI: CHEBI:135599
- ChEMBL: ChEMBL2104024
- CompTox Dashboard (EPA): DTXSID30868635
- ECHA InfoCard: 100.072.585

Chemical and physical data
- Formula: C_{17}H_{26}N_{4}O_{4}S
- Molar mass: 382.48 g·mol^{−1}
- 3D model (JSmol): Interactive image
- SMILES: CNS(=O)(=O)C1=C(C=C(C(=C1)C(=O)NCC2CCCN2CC=C)OC)N
- InChI: InChI=1S/C17H26N4O4S/c1-4-7-21-8-5-6-12(21)11-20-17(22)13-9-16(26(23,24)19-2)14(18)10-15(13)25-3/h4,9-10,12,19H,1,5-8,11,18H2,2-3H3,(H,20,22); Key:QRQMZZNDJGHPHZ-UHFFFAOYSA-N

Alpiropride (INN; brand name Revistel, Rivistel, or Rivestel) is a dopamine D_{2} receptor antagonist of the benzamide group related to sulpiride. It is described as an antihypertensive agent and has been marketed for use as an antimigraine medication in Portugal. The drug was first described by 1980 and was introduced for medical use by 1989. It remained marketed in Portugal as late as 2000.
