= N-Methylamisulpride =

Experimental antipsychotic

Clinical data
- Other names: N-Methyl amisulpride; N′-Methylamisulpride; LB-102; LB102; LB-102-LAI
- Drug class: Dopamine D_{2} and D_{3} receptor antagonist; Serotonin 5-HT_{2B} and 5-HT_{7} receptor antagonist

Identifiers
- IUPAC name: N-[(1-ethylpyrrolidin-2-yl)methyl]-5-ethylsulfonyl-2-methoxy-4-(methylamino)benzamide
- CAS Number: 2227154-23-4
- PubChem CID: 134542980
- DrugBank: DB19214
- ChemSpider: 81367337
- UNII: N81WKW91XF
- ChEMBL: ChEMBL4594422

Chemical and physical data
- Formula: C_{18}H_{29}N_{3}O_{4}S
- Molar mass: 383.51 g·mol^{−1}
- 3D model (JSmol): Interactive image
- SMILES: CCN1CCCC1CNC(=O)C2=CC(=C(C=C2OC)NC)S(=O)(=O)CC
- InChI: InChI=1S/C18H29N3O4S/c1-5-21-9-7-8-13(21)12-20-18(22)14-10-17(26(23,24)6-2)15(19-3)11-16(14)25-4/h10-11,13,19H,5-9,12H2,1-4H3,(H,20,22); Key:NXKXZXNNWRYXRE-UHFFFAOYSA-N

N-Methylamisulpride (developmental code name LB-102) is a dopamine D_{2} and D_{3} receptor antagonist and serotonin 5-HT_{2B} and 5-HT_{7} receptor antagonist which is under development for the treatment of schizophrenia. It is a benzamide derivative and is the N-methylated analogue of amisulpride. The drug is being developed for use both orally and parenterally.

Amisulpride exhibits low passive diffusion through the blood–brain barrier and this requires higher doses for central nervous system activity. N-Methylamisulpride has enhanced lipophilicity and hence improved passive diffusion through biological membranes like the blood–brain barrier compared to amisulpride. This in turn is expected to provide a higher ratio of brain to peripheral concentrations. The drug otherwise has similar pharmacodynamics and pharmacokinetics relative to amisulpride.

N-Methylamisulpride appears to have considerably greater clinical potency compared to amisulpride owing to its improved lipophilicity and blood–brain barrier permeability. A dosage of 50 mg/day N-methylamisulpride has been found to achieve 60 to 80% occupancy of the dopamine D_{2} receptor, whereas 300 to 400 mg/day amisulpride achieved around 70% occupancy and doses of 630 to 910 mg/day amisulpride achieved 70 to 80% occupancy of the receptor.

Amisulpride has been associated with QT prolongation. Due to its greater ratio of brain to peripheral concentrations and much lower doses, N-methylamisulpride is expected to have reduced risk of QT prolongation in comparison.

As of December 2023, N-methylamisulpride is in phase 2 clinical trials for schizophrenia. It is being developed by LB Pharmaceuticals.

== See also ==
- List of investigational antipsychotics
- List of investigational bipolar disorder drugs
- SEP-4199 (non-racemic amisulpride)
