= ENX-105 =

Chemical compound

Clinical data
- Other names: ENX105; Deuterated nemonapride enantiomer

Identifiers
- IUPAC name: 5-chloro-2-methoxy-N-((2R,3R)-2-methyl-1-(phenylmethyl-d2)pyrrolidin-3-yl)-4-((methyl-d3)amino)benzamide
- CAS Number: 2950168-16-6
- PubChem CID: 172553460

Chemical and physical data
- Formula: C_{21}H_{21}ClD_{5}N_{3}O_{2}
- Molar mass: 392.94 g·mol^{−1}
- 3D model (JSmol): Interactive image
- SMILES: C(N[C@H]1[C@@H](C)N(C(C2=CC=CC=C2)([2H])[2H])CC1)(=O)C3=C(OC)C=C(NC([2H])([2H])[2H])C(Cl)=C3
- InChI: InChI=1S/C21H26ClN3O2/c1-14-18(9-10-25(14)13-15-7-5-4-6-8-15)24-21(26)16-11-17(22)19(23-2)12-20(16)27-3/h4-8,11-12,14,18,23H,9-10,13H2,1-3H3,(H,24,26)/t14-,18-/m1/s1/i2D3,13D2; Key:KRVOJOCLBAAKSJ-RUFGIDIBSA-N

ENX-105 is an investigational new drug being developed by Engrail Therapeutics for the treatment of post-traumatic stress disorder (PTSD). It is currently in the preclinical stage, trailing behind a closely related Engrail compound, ENX-104, which is focused on depression and anhedonia.

The drug is described as a dopamine D_{2} and D_{3} receptor antagonist and serotonin 5-HT_{1A} and 5-HT_{2A} receptor agonist. Its antagonistic potencies (IC_{50}) are 0.08 nM at the dopamine D_{2L} receptor, 0.8 nM at the dopamine D_{2S} receptor, and 3.8 nM at the dopamine D_{3} receptor, whereas its activational potencies (EC_{50}) are 5 nM at the serotonin 5-HT_{2A} receptor and 16 nM at the serotonin 5-HT_{1A} receptor.

ENX-105 does not produce the head-twitch response, a behavioral proxy of psychedelic effects, in rodents, and hence is putatively non-hallucinogenic. The drug has shown anxiolytic-, antipsychotic-, anti-anhedonic-, and pro-cognitive-like effects in rodents. It has also been found to increase dopamine levels in the nucleus accumbens in rodents.

As with ENX-104, ENX-105 is a deuterated enantiomer of nemonapride.

== See also ==
- List of investigational hallucinogens and entactogens
- Non-hallucinogenic 5-HT_{2A} receptor agonist
- ENX-104 and ENX-205
