= Cognitive behavioral analysis system of psychotherapy =

Model of behavioral therapies

The cognitive behavioral analysis system of psychotherapy (CBASP) is a talking therapy, a synthesis model of interpersonal and cognitive and behavioral therapies developed by James P. McCullough Jr. of Virginia Commonwealth University specifically for the treatment of all varieties of DSM-IV chronic depression. McCullough writes that chronic depression (i.e., depressive disorder in adults that lasts continuously for two or more years, or one year continuously in adolescents), particularly the type beginning during adolescence (early-onset), is essentially a refractory mood disorder arising from traumatic experiences or interpersonal psychological insults delivered by the patient's significant others (nuclear or extended family).

== Basic assumptions ==
Absence of felt interpersonal safety in patients. Chronic mood (e.g., chronic depression) denotes an absence of felt safety as regards (a) the precipitating (original) trauma event(s) or on a less sudden and violent level, (b) maltreating-hurtful significant others who have inflicted psychological insults on the individual through interpersonal rejection, harsh punishment, censure, or emotional abandonment/neglect. The lack of felt safety (c) has been transferred to a generalized fear of interpersonal relationships. For patients, more often than not, "people are hell" to borrow a phrase from Jean-Paul Sartre. Whether the etiology includes sudden trauma or psychological insults, the predominant coping strategy that maintains the dysphoric mood condition is an interpersonal avoidance of persons in the home, at work, or in the social environment. The patient's successful situational and interpersonal avoidance pattern is the major treatment issue when the chronically depressed individual enters psychotherapy.

No change is possible as long as interpersonal avoidance patterns remain. As noted above, no emotional modification or termination of the chronic depression mood is possible apart from terminating patient interpersonal avoidance by enabling them to encounter the original precipitating trauma (violent/sudden event) or the psychological insults that stem from chronic interpersonal punishment, abuse or emotional neglect. The active arena where change processes are targeted and occur in CBASP psychotherapy involves the current interpersonal milieu within which the patient functions.

== Treatment strategies ==
In-session focus exercises in an atmosphere of felt safety help patients confront the feared stimuli and modify the Pavlovian fear driving the refractory emotional state. Learning appropriate non-avoidant ways to deal with the fear stimuli also decreases Skinnerian avoidance behavior and prepares the way for mood change. In the beginning of therapy, it should be remembered that the chronic mood associated with trauma or psychological insults may involve stimulus events that remain tacit knowledge (out of awareness) for patients (i.e., the pain, fear and anxiety are clearly observable but the actual precipitating and maintaining stimuli may not be clearly understood or recognized by the patient). Material derived from the Significant Other History (SOH) often illustrates the tacit knowledge dimension of the patient's avoidance patterns. In summary, another way to describe what's going on in the beginning of therapy is to say that patients are avoiding others (including the therapist) and not responding to the interpersonal environment. Interpersonal avoidance always dictates that the patient's primary focus remains on himself or herself (i.e., patients stay "in their heads"). In such a psychosocial functioning state, these individuals remain helpless and hopeless and continue to respond to themselves in a solitary and never-ending circle of pain, fear, anxiety (and depression); hence, they are unable to connect with their interpersonal world in any informing way.

== Therapist role ==
A feature of CBASP is the interpersonal role of the psychotherapist. CBASP clinicians enact a "disciplined personal involvement role" to heal the injurious interpersonal traumas and psychological insults patients have received at the hands of harmful significant others.

== Outcome goals of treatment and beyond ==
The goals of CBASP treatment are (1) to connect patients perceptually and behaviorally to the interpersonal world they live in so that their behavior is informed by environmental (interpersonal) influences; (2) CBASP teaches patients how to make themselves feel better emotionally as well as how to maintain affective control; (3) patients are taught to negotiate interpersonal relationships successfully which means that patients acquire the requisite skills to obtain desirable interpersonal goals; (4) finally, patients learn the crucial importance of "maintaining" the treatment gains after psychotherapy ends. Maintaining the gains requires daily practice of the in-session learning which protects (perpetuates) the extinction of the old pathological patterns of behavior. Post-therapy practice for the rest of their lives holds in abeyance the ever-present danger of relapse and recurrence.

== Combination treatment ==
A large-scale study, published in 2000 by Martin Keller of Brown Medical School and others, compared the (then available) antidepressant Serzone with CBASP. 681 patients with severe chronic depression (some with other psychiatric illnesses) were enrolled in the trial, and were assigned to either Serzone, CBASP, or combination Serzone-CBASP for 12 weeks. The response rates to either Serzone or CBASP alone were 55 percent and 52 percent, respectively, for the 76 percent who completed the study. In other words, a little more than half of the completers in those two arms of the trial reduced their depression by 50 percent or better.

The Serzone findings roughly correspond with many other trial results for antidepressants, and underscore a major weakness in these drugs—that while they are effective, the benefit is often marginal and the treatment outcome problematic. Similarly, the CBASP findings validate other studies finding talking therapy about equal in efficacy to taking antidepressants.

The results for the combination drug-therapy group, however, were surprising, with 85 percent of the completing patients achieving a 50 percent reduction in symptoms or better. 42 percent in the combination group achieved remission (a virtual elimination of all depressive symptoms) compared to 22 percent in the Serzone group and 24 percent in the CBASP group.

The authors of the frequently cited study noted that "the rates of response and remission in the combined-treatment group were substantially higher than those that might have been anticipated on the basis of the outcomes of previous trials in similar patients." Their figures show that treating depression with a combination of both an anti-depressant drug and a form of cognitive behavior therapy can be highly effective, giving substantially better results than other methods of dealing with depression.
