= Dopamine antagonist =

Drug which blocks dopamine receptors

Dopamine receptor antagonist
- Drug class
- Skeletal structural formula of haloperidol, a typical antipsychotic.

Class identifiers
- Synonyms: Dopaminergic blocker, anti-dopaminergic
- Use: Schizophrenia, bipolar disorder, nausea/vomiting
- ATC code: N05A
- Biological target: Dopamine receptors

External links
- MeSH: D012559

Legal status

A dopamine antagonist, also known as an anti-dopaminergic and a dopamine receptor antagonist (DRA), is a type of drug which blocks dopamine receptors by receptor antagonism. Most antipsychotics are dopamine antagonists, and have been used in treating schizophrenia, bipolar disorder, and stimulant psychosis. Several other dopamine antagonists are antiemetics used in the treatment of nausea and vomiting.

== Receptor pharmacology ==
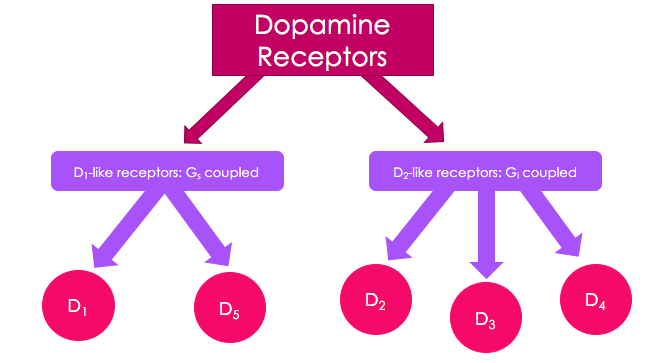
Dopamine receptor flow chart

Dopamine receptors are all G protein–coupled receptors, and are divided into two classes based on which G-protein they are coupled to. The D_{1}-like class of dopamine receptors is coupled to Gα_{s/olf} and stimulates adenylate cyclase production, whereas the D_{2}-like class is coupled to Gα_{i/o} and thus inhibits adenylate cyclase production.

=== D_{1}-like receptors: D_{1} and D_{5} ===
D_{1}-like receptors – D_{1} and D_{5} are always found post-synaptically. The genes coding these receptors lack introns, so there are no splice variants.

==== D_{1} receptors ====
- D_{1} receptors are found mainly on neurons in the nucleus accumbens as well as substantia nigra, striatum, amygdala, frontal cortex and olfactory bulb and retina
- Also found (in lower levels) in the hypothalamus, thalamus, cerebellum and hippocampus
- Peripherally, these receptors have been found in the renal artery, mesenteric artery, and splenic artery where activation leads to vasodilation. In addition, D_{1} receptors have been found in the kidney

==== D_{5} receptors ====
- Low levels of D_{5} receptors have been found in the hypothalamus, prefrontal cortex and cingulate cortex; as well as memory areas such as hippocampus, dentate gyrus and entorhinal cortex.
- In addition, D_{5} receptors have been found in the kidney

=== D_{2}-like receptors: D_{2}, D_{3} and D_{4} ===
D_{2}-like receptors – unlike the D_{1}-like class, these receptors are found pre and post-synaptically. The genes that code these receptors have introns, leading to many alternately spliced variants.

==== D_{2} receptors ====
- D_{2} receptors are found in the striatum, substantia nigra, ventral tegmental area, hypothalamus, cortex, septum, amygdala, hippocampus, and olfactory tubercle.
- These receptors have also been found in the retina and pituitary gland.
- Peripherally, these receptors have been found in the renal, mesenteric, and splenic arteries as well as on the adrenal cortex and medulla and within the kidney.

==== D_{3} receptors ====
- D_{3} receptors are highly expressed on neurons in islands of Calleja and nucleus accumbens shell and lowly expressed in areas such as the substantia nigra pars compacta, hippocampus, septal area, and ventral tegmental area.
- Additional studies have found these receptors peripherally in the kidney

==== D_{4} receptors ====
- D_{4} receptors are found in amygdala, hippocampus, hypothalamus, globus pallidus, substantia nigra pars reticula, the thalamus, the retina and the kidney

== Implications in disease ==
The dopaminergic system has been implicated in a variety of disorders. Parkinson's disease results from loss of dopaminergic neurons in the striatum. Dopamine is believed to play a significant role in the pathogenesis of schizophrenia, with most effective antipsychotics blocking D_{2} receptors. Additional studies hypothesize dopamine dysregulation is involved in Huntington's disease, ADHD, Tourette's syndrome, major depression, bipolar disorder, addiction, hypertension and kidney dysfunction.

Dopamine receptor antagonists are used in the management of a broad range of diseases and conditions such as schizophrenia, bipolar disorder, nausea and vomiting.

Melatonin suppresses dopamine activity as part of normal circadian rhythm functions, and pathological imbalances have been implicated in Parkinson's disease

== Side effects ==
They may include one or more of the following and last indefinitely even after cessation of the dopamine antagonist, especially after long-term or high-dosage use:

- Cardiovascular disease
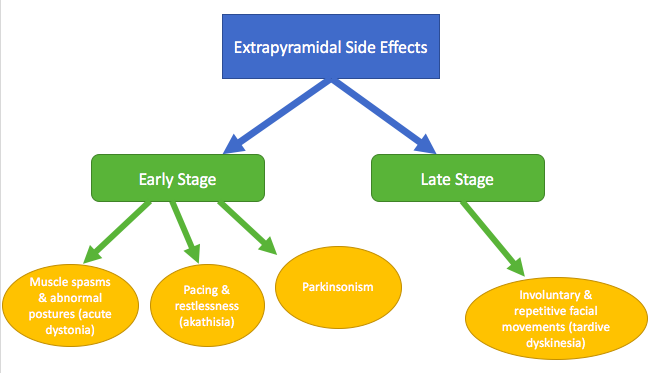
- Extrapyramidal symptoms (EPS) associated with typical antipsychotics:
  - Early stage – occurs at onset of treatment or following increased dose, patients recover when dose is decreased
    - Acute dystonias – muscle spasms and sustained abnormal postures and onset occurs within a few days; can be treated with anticholinergics
      - risk factors include age, gender and family history
    - Akathisia - pacing and restlessness and onset occurs within the first few months; can be treated with beta blockers and benzodiazepines
    - Parkinsonism due to effects on the nigrostriatal pathway - includes tremors, bradykinesia and muscle rigidity
      - risk factors include age and gender
  - Late stage – occurs after prolonged (months-years) treatment, symptoms persist even after dose is decreased
    - Tardive dyskinesia - includes involuntary and repetitive facial movements
      - risk factors include age, race and gender
  - It is hypothesized that these effects are due to chronic blockade of the D_{2} receptor
- Hyperprolactinaemia due to blockade of the D_{2} receptors in the anterior pituitary leading to increased prolactin release
- Increased appetite including increased craving and binge eating that lead to weight gain
- Increased risk for insulin resistance
- Sexual dysfunction
- Metabolic changes with increased risk of obesity and diabetes mellitus type 2
- Sedation
- Neuroleptic Malignant Syndrome is a medical emergency caused by a decrease in dopaminergic activity, resulting in a central D_{2} receptor blockade.

== Examples ==
=== First-generation antipsychotics (typical) ===
First generation antipsychotics are used to treat schizophrenia and are often accompanied by extrapyramidal side effects. They inhibit dopaminergic neurotransmission in the brain by blocking about 72% of the D2 dopamine receptors. They can also block noradrenergic, cholinergic, and histaminergic activity.

- Benperidol binds D_{2} and some serotonin receptors. It is absorbed very easily and has a high first pass effect.
- Chlorpromazine binds D_{3} with the highest affinity, but also binds D_{1}, D_{2}, D_{4} and D_{5}

Chemical Structure of typical antipsychotic chlorpromazine

- Clopenthixol
- Droperidol is used as an antipsychotic and antiemetic.
- Haloperidol binds D_{2}, D_{3} and D_{4} with the highest affinity, but also binds D_{1} and D_{5.} Haloperidol also has a risk for QTc prolongation.
- Fluphenazine binds D_{2} and D_{3} with the highest affinity but D_{1} and D_{5} as well
- Flupentixol binds D_{1}, D_{2}, D_{3}, and D_{5} and is also used as an antidepressant.
- Fluspirilene
- Levomepromazine
- Penfluridol
- Perazine
- Perphenazine
- Pimozide binds D_{2} and D_{3} with high affinity, also binds D_{4} receptors
- Spiperone binds D_{2}, D_{3} and D_{4} with high affinity; can also bind D_{1}
- Sulpiride binds D_{2} and D_{3} and is also used as an antidepressant.
- Thioridazine binds D_{2}, D_{3} and D_{4} with high affinity; can also bind D_{1} and D_{5} at higher concentrations Thioridazine has the highest associated risk of QTc prolongation among neuroleptics.

=== Second-generation antipsychotics (atypical) ===
These drugs are not only dopamine antagonists at the receptor specified, but also act on serotonin receptor 5HT_{2A.} These drugs have fewer extrapyramidal side effects and are less likely to affect prolactin levels when compared to typical antipsychotics.

- Amisulpride binds D_{2} and D_{3} and is used as an antipsychotic, antidepressant and also treats bipolar disorder. It treats both the positive and negative symptoms of schizophrenia.
- Asenapine binds D_{2}, D_{3} and D_{4} and is used to treat bipolar disorder and schizophrenia. Its side effects include weight gain but there is lower risk for orthostatic hypotension and hyperprolactinemia.
- Aripiprazole binds D_{2} as a partial agonist but antagonizes D_{3.} In addition, aripiprazole treats schizophrenia, bipolar disorder (mania), depression, and tic disorders

Clozapine

- Clozapine binds D_{1} and D_{4} with the highest affinity but still binds D_{2} and D_{3}. Clozapine is usually only prescribed when treatment with other antipsychotics has failed, due to its rare but potentially very serious side effects. It also requires regular white blood cell counts, initially weekly then less frequently, to monitor for potential neutropenia, at least for the first 1-2 years of treatment.
- Loxapine binds D_{2}, D_{3} and D_{4} with high affinity; can also bind D_{1.} Loxapine is often used to treat agitated and violent patients with neuropsychiatric disorders such as bipolar disorder and schizophrenia.
- Nemonapride binds D_{3}, D_{4} and D_{5.}
- Olanzapine binds all receptors and is used to treat the positive and negative symptoms of schizophrenia as well as bipolar disorder and depression. It has been associated with significant weight gain.
- Quetiapine binds D_{1}, D_{2} and D_{3} and can bind D_{4} at high concentrations. It is used to treat the positive symptoms of schizophrenia, bipolar disorder and depression. Of the second generation antipsychotics, quetiapine may produce fewer parkinsonian side effects.
- Paliperidone binds D_{2}, D_{3} and D_{4} with high affinity; can also bind D_{1} and D_{5}.
- Remoxipride binds D_{2} receptors with relatively low affinity.
- Risperidone binds D_{2}, D_{3} and D_{4} receptors. Risperidone not only treats the positive and negative symptoms of schizophrenia but also treats bipolar disorder.
- Tiapride blocks D_{2} and D_{3} and is used as an antipsychotic. It is also often used to treat dyskinesias, psychomotor agitations, tics, Huntington's chorea and alcohol dependence.
- Ziprasidone blocks the D_{2} receptor and is used to treat schizophrenia, depression and bipolar disorder. There is controversy on whether Ziprasidone treats negative symptoms and it has well documented gastrointestinal side effects. Ziprasidone can also cause QTc prolongation.

=== Dopamine antagonists used to treat nausea and vomiting ===
- Domperidone is a peripherally selective dopamine D_{2} receptor antagonist used as an antiemetic, gastroprokinetic agent and galactagogue.
- Bromopride binds enteric D_{2} receptors and also treats gastroparesis.
- Metoclopramide is an effective antiemetic, prokinetic and also treats gastroparesis

=== Antagonists used only in research settings ===
- Eticlopride binds D_{2} and D_{3} with high affinity but also binds D_{4}
- Nafadotride binds D_{2} and D_{3}
- Raclopride binds D_{2} and D_{3} and can be radiolabeled and used in PET imaging to identify disease progression in Huntington's disease

=== Other dopamine antagonists ===
- Mesdopetam is under development for levodopa-induced dyskinesia and psychosis in people with Parkinson's disease
