= Tucidinostat =

Chemical compound

Clinical data
- Trade names: Epidaza, Hiyasta
- Other names: Chidamide, HBI-8000
- ATC code: L01XH06 (WHO)

Identifiers
- IUPAC name: N-(2-Amino-4-fluorophenyl)-4-[[[(E)-3-pyridin-3-ylprop-2-enoyl]amino]methyl]benzamide
- CAS Number: 1616493-44-7
- PubChem CID: 12136798
- DrugBank: 06334
- ChemSpider: 7976319
- UNII: 87CIC980Y0
- KEGG: D10993
- ChEMBL: ChEMBL3621988
- CompTox Dashboard (EPA): DTXSID701032295

Chemical and physical data
- Formula: C_{22}H_{19}FN_{4}O_{2}
- Molar mass: 390.418 g·mol^{−1}
- 3D model (JSmol): Interactive image
- SMILES: C1=CC(=CN=C1)/C=C/C(=O)NCC2=CC=C(C=C2)C(=O)NC3=C(C=C(C=C3)F)N
- InChI: InChI=1S/C22H19FN4O2/c23-18-8-9-20(19(24)12-18)27-22(29)17-6-3-16(4-7-17)14-26-21(28)10-5-15-2-1-11-25-13-15/h1-13H,14,24H2,(H,26,28)(H,27,29)/b10-5+; Key:SZMJVTADHFNAIS-BJMVGYQFSA-N

Tucidinostat (INN, also known as chidamide and sold under the brand names Epidaza and Hiyasta) is a histone deacetylase inhibitor (HDI) developed in China. It was also known as HBI-8000. It is a benzamide HDI and inhibits Class I HDAC1, HDAC2, HDAC3, as well as Class IIb HDAC10.

Tucidinostat is approved by the Chinese FDA for relapsed or refractory peripheral T-cell lymphoma (PTCL) and has orphan drug status in Japan. In Japan, it was approved for relapsed or refractory adult T-cell leukemia-lymphoma (ATLL) treatment in June 2021.

Tucidinostat is being researched as a treatment for pancreatic cancer. However, it is not US FDA approved for the treatment of pancreatic cancer.
