= Clebopride =

Dopamine antagonist drug

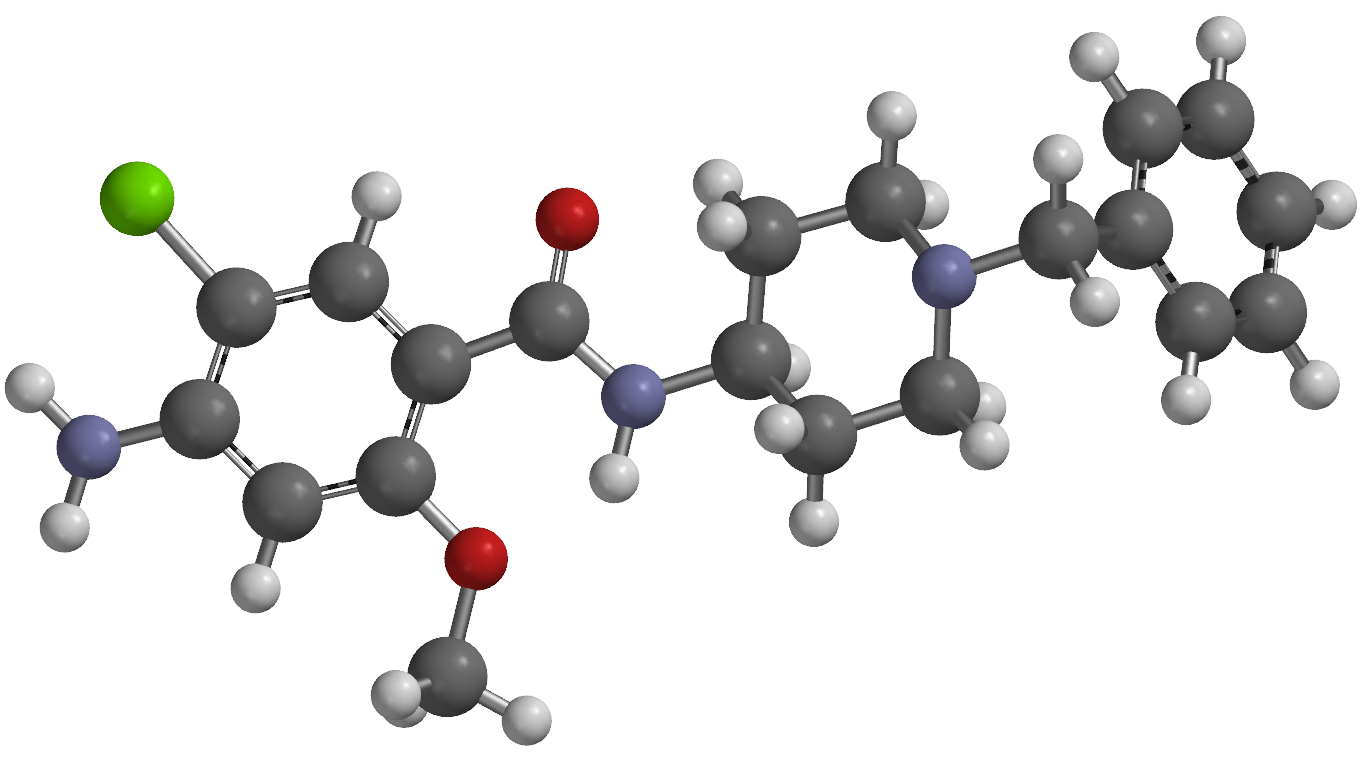

Clinical data
- AHFS/Drugs.com: International Drug Names
- ATC code: A03FA06 (WHO)

Identifiers
- IUPAC name: 4-amino-N-(1-benzylpiperidin-4-yl)-5-chloro- 2-methoxybenzamide
- CAS Number: 55905-53-8
- PubChem CID: 2780
- ChemSpider: 2678
- UNII: I0A84520Y9
- KEGG: D03534
- ChEMBL: ChEMBL325109
- CompTox Dashboard (EPA): DTXSID7022831
- ECHA InfoCard: 100.054.424

Chemical and physical data
- Formula: C_{20}H_{24}ClN_{3}O_{2}
- Molar mass: 373.88 g·mol^{−1}
- 3D model (JSmol): Interactive image
- SMILES: Clc1cc(c(OC)cc1N)C(=O)NC3CCN(Cc2ccccc2)CC3
- InChI: InChI=1S/C20H24ClN3O2/c1-26-19-12-18(22)17(21)11-16(19)20(25)23-15-7-9-24(10-8-15)13-14-5-3-2-4-6-14/h2-6,11-12,15H,7-10,13,22H2,1H3,(H,23,25); Key:BVPWJMCABCPUQY-UHFFFAOYSA-N

Clebopride is a dopamine antagonist drug with antiemetic and prokinetic properties used to treat functional gastrointestinal disorders. Chemically, it is a substituted benzamide, closely related to metoclopramide.

A small Spanish study found that more adverse reactions are reported with clebopride than with metoclopramide, particularly extrapyramidal symptoms.
