= Batanopride =

Chemical compound

Clinical data
- Routes of administration: Oral
- ATC code: none

Legal status
- Legal status: In general: uncontrolled

Identifiers
- IUPAC name: 4-Amino-5-chloro-N-(2-diethylaminoethyl)-2-(3-oxobutan-2-yloxy)benzamide
- CAS Number: 102670-46-2
- PubChem CID: 59692
- ChemSpider: 53849
- UNII: 1AT99K728N
- ChEMBL: ChEMBL38594
- CompTox Dashboard (EPA): DTXSID20869373

Chemical and physical data
- Formula: C_{17}H_{26}ClN_{3}O_{3}
- Molar mass: 355.86 g·mol^{−1}
- 3D model (JSmol): Interactive image
- SMILES: Clc1cc(c(OC(C(=O)C)C)cc1N)C(=O)NCCN(CC)CC
- InChI: InChI=1S/C17H26ClN3O3/c1-5-21(6-2)8-7-20-17(23)13-9-14(18)15(19)10-16(13)24-12(4)11(3)22/h9-10,12H,5-8,19H2,1-4H3,(H,20,23); Key:ZYOJXUNLLOBURP-UHFFFAOYSA-N

Batanopride (BMY-25,801) is an antiemetic drug of the benzamide class which acts as a selective 5-HT_{3} receptor antagonist. It was trialled to reduce nausea during cancer chemotherapy, but was never approved for medical use due to dose-limiting side effects including hypotension and long QT syndrome.
