= ENX-205 =

Clinical data
- Other names: ENX205
- Routes of administration: Oral
- Drug class: Dopamine D_{2} and D_{3} receptor antagonist; Serotonin 5-HT_{1A} and 5-HT_{2A} receptor agonist; Non-hallucinogenic psychoplastogen
- ATC code: None

ENX-205 is a drug which is under development for the treatment of mood disorders and post-traumatic stress disorder (PTSD). It is taken orally.

The drug acts as a dual dopamine D_{2} and D_{3} receptor antagonist and serotonin 5-HT_{1A} and 5-HT_{2A} receptor agonist. The drug is about 10-fold more potent as a dopamine D_{2} receptor antagonist than as a serotonin 5-HT_{2A} receptor agonist (K_{i} = 0.04 nM vs. 9.3 nM, respectively; IC_{50} = 0.5 nM vs. EC_{50} = 5 nM, respectively). Accordingly, ENX-205 showed much greater occupancy of the dopamine D_{2} receptor than the serotonin 5-HT_{2A} receptor in rodents (~66% and ~20%, respectively).

The drug is described as a non-hallucinogenic psychoplastogen via its serotonin 5-HT_{2A} receptor agonism, with the drug failing to produce the head-twitch response but robustly enhancing neuroplasticity in preclinical research. In addition, it increases dopamine levels in the nucleus accumbens and prefrontal cortex in rodents, consistent with presynaptic dopamine D_{2} and D_{3} receptor antagonism and possible disinhibition of dopaminergic signaling within these areas. The drug has been found to produce antidepressant-like, antianhedonic-like, anxiolytic-like, and prosocial-like effects in rodents.

ENX-205 is under development by Engrail Therapeutics. As of December 2025, it is in phase 1 clinical trials for treatment of mood disorders and PTSD. The chemical structure of ENX-205 does not yet appear to have been disclosed.

== See also ==
- List of investigational hallucinogens and entactogens
- List of investigational post-traumatic stress disorder drugs
- List of investigational antidepressants
- Non-hallucinogenic 5-HT_{2A} receptor agonist
- ENX-104 and ENX-105
