= Dazopride =

Chemical compound

Clinical data
- Routes of administration: Oral
- ATC code: none

Legal status
- Legal status: In general: uncontrolled

Identifiers
- IUPAC name: 4-amino-5-chloro-N-(1,2-diethylpyrazolidin-4-yl)-2-methoxybenzamide
- CAS Number: 70181-03-2
- PubChem CID: 54801
- ChemSpider: 49487
- UNII: CV07VSP2G8
- CompTox Dashboard (EPA): DTXSID80867875

Chemical and physical data
- Formula: C_{15}H_{23}ClN_{4}O_{2}
- Molar mass: 326.83 g·mol^{−1}

Dazopride (AHR-5531) is an antiemetic and gastroprokinetic agent of the benzamide class which was never marketed. It acts as a 5-HT_{3} receptor antagonist and 5-HT_{4} receptor agonist. In addition to its gastrointestinal effects, dazopride facilitates learning and memory in mice.

== See also ==
- Antiemetic
- Benzamide
