= Sultopride =

Antipsychotic medication

Clinical data
- Trade names: Barnetil, Barnotil, Topral
- AHFS/Drugs.com: International Drug Names
- Routes of administration: Oral, intramuscular
- ATC code: N05AL02 (WHO)

Legal status
- Legal status: BR: Class C1 (Other controlled substances); In general: ℞ (Prescription only)

Pharmacokinetic data
- Elimination half-life: 3–5 hours

Identifiers
- IUPAC name: N-[(1-ethylpyrrolidin-2-yl)methyl]-5-ethylsulfonyl-2-methoxybenzamide
- CAS Number: 53583-79-2
- PubChem CID: 5357
- ChemSpider: 5164
- UNII: AA0G3TW31W
- KEGG: D08549
- ChEMBL: ChEMBL277945
- CompTox Dashboard (EPA): DTXSID9023627
- ECHA InfoCard: 100.053.293

Chemical and physical data
- Formula: C_{17}H_{26}N_{2}O_{4}S
- Molar mass: 354.47 g·mol^{−1}
- 3D model (JSmol): Interactive image
- SMILES: O=S(=O)(c1cc(c(OC)cc1)C(=O)NCC2N(CC)CCC2)CC
- InChI: InChI=1S/C17H26N2O4S/c1-4-19-10-6-7-13(19)12-18-17(20)15-11-14(24(21,22)5-2)8-9-16(15)23-3/h8-9,11,13H,4-7,10,12H2,1-3H3,(H,18,20); Key:UNRHXEPDKXPRTM-UHFFFAOYSA-N

Sultopride, sold under the brand name Barnetil among others, is an antipsychotic medication of the benzamide chemical class used in Europe, Japan, and Hong Kong for the treatment of schizophrenia. It was launched by Sanofi-Aventis in 1976. Sultopride acts as a selective D_{2} and D_{3} receptor antagonist. It has also been shown to have clinically relevant affinity for the GHB receptor as well, a property it shares in common with amisulpride and sulpiride.

== Pharmacology ==
Sultopride
Site	Ki	Species	Ref
D_{2}	1.6	Human	
D_{3}	3.8	Human	
