= Eticlopride =

Chemical compound

Clinical data
- ATC code: none

Identifiers
- IUPAC name: 5-chloro-3-ethyl-N-[[(2S)-1-ethylpyrrolidin-2-yl]methyl]-2-hydroxy-6-methoxybenzamide
- CAS Number: 84226-12-0; HCl: 97612-24-3
- PubChem CID: 57267
- IUPHAR/BPS: 966
- ChemSpider: 51626
- UNII: J8M468HBH4; HCl: HJ2CAH4TZ1
- ChEMBL: ChEMBL8946
- CompTox Dashboard (EPA): DTXSID9048435

Chemical and physical data
- Formula: C_{17}H_{25}ClN_{2}O_{3}
- Molar mass: 340.85 g·mol^{−1}
- 3D model (JSmol): Interactive image
- SMILES: CCC1=CC(=C(C(=C1O)C(=O)NCC2CCCN2CC)OC)Cl

Eticlopride is a selective dopamine antagonist that acts on D_{2} dopamine receptor. It is primarily used in pharmacological research.
