= Isocycloseram =

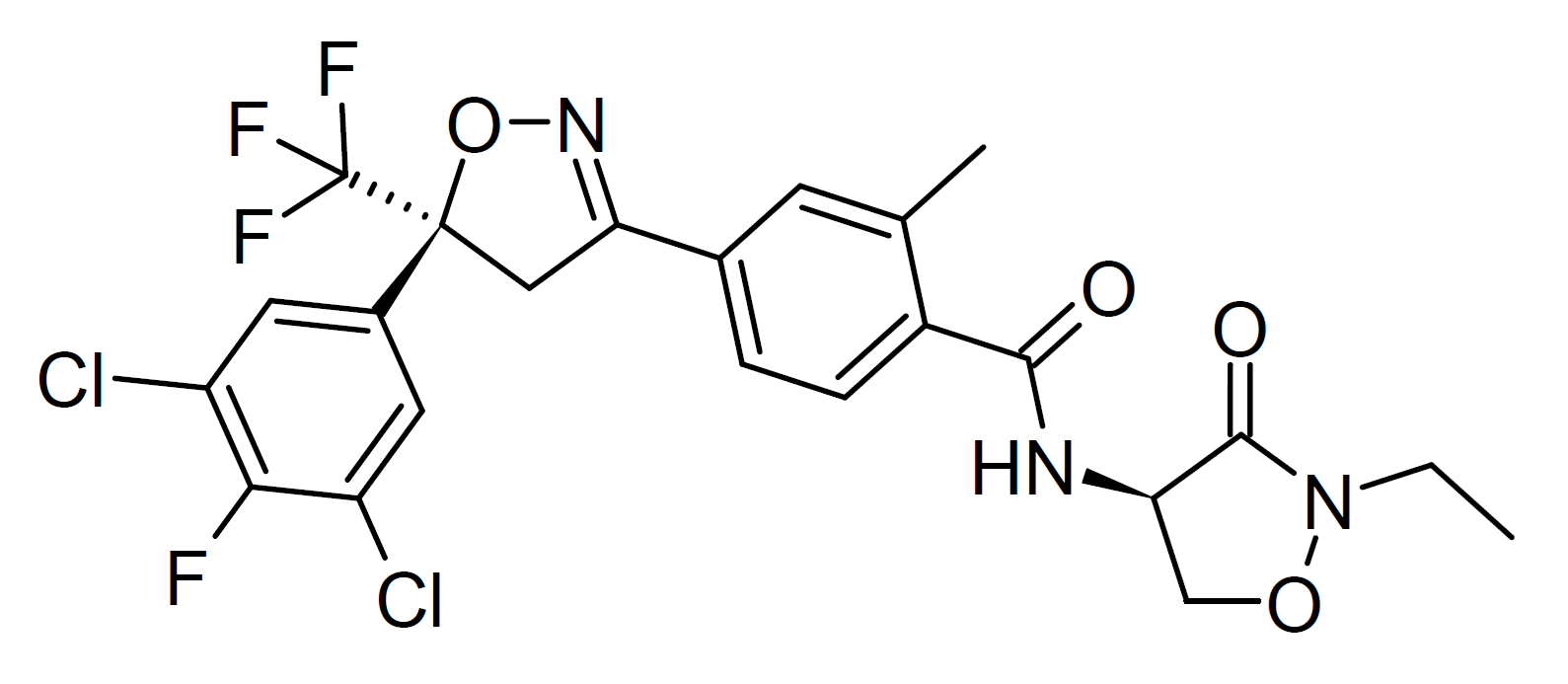

Names
- Preferred IUPAC name 4-[(5S)-5-(3,5-dichloro-4-fluorophenyl)-5-(trifluoromethyl)-4H-1,2-oxazol-3-yl]-N-[(4R)-2-ethyl-3-oxo-1,2-oxazolidin-4-yl]-2-methylbenzamide

Identifiers
CAS Number	1309959-62-3
3D model (JSmol)	Interactive image
ChEBI	CHEBI:191374
ChemSpider	128919235
ECHA InfoCard	100.340.824
EC Number	941-777-4
PubChem CID	118261601
UNII	2M3T3NFC78
CompTox Dashboard (EPA)	DTXSID401337424
- InChI: InChI=1S/C23H19Cl2F4N3O4/c1-3-32-21(34)18(10-35-32)30-20(33)14-5-4-12(6-11(14)2)17-9-22(36-31-17,23(27,28)29)13-7-15(24)19(26)16(25)8-13/h4-8,18H,3,9-10H2,1-2H3,(H,30,33)/t18-,22+/m1/s1 Key: WLSQDEYDCAGPIR-GCJKJVERSA-N
- SMILES: CCN1C(=O)[C@@H](CO1)NC(=O)C2=C(C=C(C=C2)C3=NO[C@@](C3)(C4=CC(=C(C(=C4)Cl)F)Cl)C(F)(F)F)C

Properties
Chemical formula	C_{23}H_{19}Cl_{2}F_{4}N_{3}O_{4}
Molar mass	548.32 g·mol^{−1}
- Except where otherwise noted, data are given for materials in their standard state (at 25 °C [77 °F], 100 kPa). Infobox references

Isocycloseram is a chemical compound discovered by Syngenta which acts as an insecticide. It acts as a noncompetitive antagonist of invertebrate γ-aminobutyric acid (GABA)-gated chloride channels, producing uncontrolled neuronal excitation leading to paralysis and death in various species of insects, but with high selectivity over mammalian GABA receptors. Unwanted toxicity to desirable non targeted insects such as pollinators can be an issue, requiring strategic application and use.

== Uses ==
=== Pesticide ===
In November 2025, the U.S. Environmental Protection Agency approved agricultural use of isocycloseram as a pesticide. Because the compound is defined as a PFAS by the European Union, OECD, and several U.S. states, concerns were raised about health and environment impacts of the approval. The U.S. EPA does not consider chemicals with a single fluorinated carbon like isocycloseram to be PFAS and contends that "molecules with only one fluorinated carbon generally lack the persistence and bioaccumulation properties that are commonly associated with forever chemicals".
