= SEP-4199 =

Chemical compound

- Aramisulpride (R)-amisulpride

- Esamisulpride (S)-amisulpride

Clinical data
- Other names: SEP4199; Non-racemic amisulpride; Aramisulpride/esamisulpride; Esamisulpride/aramisulpride
- Routes of administration: Oral

Legal status
- Legal status: Investigational

Identifiers
- CAS Number: 71675-90-6 (R) 71675-92-8 (S)
- PubChem CID: 5746246; 3055076
- UNII: B4J10KD2KI; ES3TWM82E8

Chemical and physical data
- Formula: C_{17}H_{27}N_{3}O_{4}S
- Molar mass: 369.48 g·mol^{−1}

SEP-4199, also known as non-racemic amisulpride, is a non-racemic form of amisulpride which is under development for the treatment of bipolar depression. It is taken by mouth.

It was developed to have higher binding affinity for the serotonin 5-HT_{7} receptor and lower affinity for the dopamine D_{2} receptor compared to conventional racemic amisulpride. It contains the (R)- and (S)-enantiomers of amisulpride (aramisulpride and esamisulpride) in an 85:15 ratio rather than a 50:50 ratio. The modification is hoped to give the compound improved effectiveness and fewer side effects.

If approved, it would be the first form of amisulpride approved in the United States for psychiatric indications. It is in phase 3 clinical trials for bipolar depression as of December 2023. Its development was reported to have been discontinued in certain countries including the United States and Japan in November and December 2023. Sources are conflicting on whether it remains in development.

== See also ==
- List of investigational antidepressants
- List of investigational bipolar disorder drugs
- N-Methylamisulpride (LB-102)
