= Remoxipride =

Antipsychotic medication

Clinical data
- Trade names: Roxiam
- Routes of administration: Oral
- ATC code: N05AL04 (WHO)

Legal status
- Legal status: Withdrawn

Pharmacokinetic data
- Bioavailability: 96%
- Protein binding: 89-98%
- Metabolism: Hepatic
- Elimination half-life: 4-7 hours
- Excretion: Renal

Identifiers
- IUPAC name: 3-bromo-N-[[(2S)-1-ethylpyrrolidin-2-yl]methyl]-2,6-dimethoxybenzamide
- CAS Number: 80125-14-0
- PubChem CID: 54477
- DrugBank: DB00409
- ChemSpider: 49195
- UNII: 0223RD59PE
- KEGG: D02683
- ChEMBL: ChEMBL22242
- CompTox Dashboard (EPA): DTXSID6045668

Chemical and physical data
- Formula: C_{16}H_{23}BrN_{2}O_{3}
- Molar mass: 371.275 g·mol^{−1}
- 3D model (JSmol): Interactive image
- SMILES: CCN2CCC[C@H]2CNC(=O)c1c(OC)ccc(Br)c1OC
- InChI: InChI=1S/C16H23BrN2O3/c1-4-19-9-5-6-11(19)10-18-16(20)14-13(21-2)8-7-12(17)15(14)22-3/h7-8,11H,4-6,9-10H2,1-3H3,(H,18,20)/t11-/m0/s1; Key:GUJRSXAPGDDABA-NSHDSACASA-N

Remoxipride (Roxiam) is an atypical antipsychotic (although according to some sources it is a typical antipsychotic) which was previously used in Europe for the treatment of schizophrenia and acute mania but was withdrawn due to toxicity concerns (incidence of aplastic anemia in 1/10,000 patients). It was initially launched by AstraZeneca in 1990 and suspension of its use began in 1993. Remoxipride acts as a selective D_{2} and D_{3} receptor antagonist and also has high affinity for the sigma receptor, possibly playing a role in its atypical neuroleptic action.

Due to its short half-life twice daily (bid) dosing is required, although a once-daily controlled-release tablet has been developed. There was some interest in its use in the treatment of treatment-resistant schizophrenia.

== See also ==
- Typical antipsychotic
- Benzamide
