= Raclopride =

Chemical compound

Clinical data
- ATC code: none

Identifiers
- IUPAC name: 3,5-dichloro-N-[[(2S)-1-ethylpyrrolidin-2-yl]methyl]-2-hydroxy-6-methoxybenzamide
- CAS Number: 84225-95-6
- PubChem CID: 3033769
- IUPHAR/BPS: 94
- ChemSpider: 2298373
- UNII: 430K3SOZ7G
- KEGG: D82063
- ChEBI: CHEBI:92070
- ChEMBL: ChEMBL8809
- CompTox Dashboard (EPA): DTXSID9045687

Chemical and physical data
- Formula: C_{15}H_{20}Cl_{2}N_{2}O_{3}
- Molar mass: 347.24 g·mol^{−1}
- 3D model (JSmol): Interactive image
- SMILES: Clc1c(O)c(c(OC)c(Cl)c1)C(=O)NC[C@H]2N(CC)CCC2
- InChI: InChI=1S/C15H20Cl2N2O3/c1-3-19-6-4-5-9(19)8-18-15(21)12-13(20)10(16)7-11(17)14(12)22-2/h7,9,20H,3-6,8H2,1-2H3,(H,18,21)/t9-/m0/s1; Key:WAOQONBSWFLFPE-VIFPVBQESA-N

Raclopride is a typical antipsychotic. It acts as a selective antagonist on D_{2} dopamine receptors. It has been used in trials studying Parkinson Disease.

Raclopride is selective for D2 and D3 dopamine receptors.

Binding profile
Receptor	K_{i}
D_{1}	18000 nM
D_{2}	1.8
D_{3}	3.5
D_{4}	2400

It can be radiolabelled with radioisotopes, e.g. ^{3}H or ^{11}C and used as a tracer for in vitro imaging (autoradiography) as well as in vivo imaging positron emission tomography (PET). Images obtained by cerebral PET scanning (e.g. PET/CT or PET/MRI) allow the non-invasive assessment of the binding capacity of the cerebral D_{2} dopamine receptor, which can be useful for the diagnosis of movement disorders. In particular, cerebral D_{2} receptor binding as measured by carbon-11-raclopride (^{11}C-raclopride) has shown to reflect disease severity of Huntington's disease, a genetic disease characterized by selective degeneration of cerebral D_{2} receptors.

Other studies have investigated the relationship of D_{2} receptor binding capacity and personality disorders. One study found decreased binding in the detachment personality trait. Radiolabelled raclopride is also commonly used to determine the efficacy and neurotoxicity of dopaminergic drugs.
