= Nemonapride =

Antipsychotic medication

Clinical data
- Trade names: Emilace (JP, CN)
- Other names: Emonapride; Emirace; YM 09151-2; YM09151-2; YM 09151; YM09151
- AHFS/Drugs.com: International Drug Names
- Routes of administration: Oral
- Drug class: Dopamine D_{2}, D_{3}, and D_{4} receptor antagonist; Serotonin 5-HT_{1A} receptor partial agonist; Antipsychotic
- ATC code: None

Legal status
- Legal status: Rx-only (JP)

Pharmacokinetic data
- Metabolism: Primarily CYP3A4
- Elimination half-life: 2.3–4.5 hours

Identifiers
- IUPAC name: N-(1-benzyl-2-methylpyrrolidin-3-yl)-5-chloro-2-methoxy-4-(methylamino)benzamide
- CAS Number: 75272-39-8
- PubChem CID: 4452
- IUPHAR/BPS: 983
- DrugBank: DB19314
- ChemSpider: 4297
- UNII: Q88T5P3444
- KEGG: D01468
- ChEBI: CHEBI:64217
- ChEMBL: ChEMBL20734
- PDB ligand: AQD (PDBe, RCSB PDB)
- CompTox Dashboard (EPA): DTXSID0042612

Chemical and physical data
- Formula: C_{21}H_{26}ClN_{3}O_{2}
- Molar mass: 387.91 g·mol^{−1}
- 3D model (JSmol): Interactive image
- SMILES: CC1C(CCN1CC2=CC=CC=C2)NC(=O)C3=CC(=C(C=C3OC)NC)Cl
- InChI: InChI=1S/C21H26ClN3O2/c1-14-18(9-10-25(14)13-15-7-5-4-6-8-15)24-21(26)16-11-17(22)19(23-2)12-20(16)27-3/h4-8,11-12,14,18,23H,9-10,13H2,1-3H3,(H,24,26); Key:KRVOJOCLBAAKSJ-UHFFFAOYSA-N

Nemonapride, also previously known as emonapride and sold under the brand name Emilace, is an atypical antipsychotic which is used in the treatment of schizophrenia. It is taken by mouth.

Side effects of nemonapride include akathisia, dystonia, hypokinesia, tremor, hypersalivation, and hyperprolactinemia, among others. The drug acts as a dopamine D_{2}, D_{3}, and D_{4} receptor antagonist. To a lesser extent, it is also a serotonin 5-HT_{1A} receptor partial agonist. Structurally, nemonapride is a benzamide derivative and is related to sulpiride and other benzamides.

Nemonapride was introduced for medical use in either 1991 or 1997. It was developed and marketed by Yamanouchi Pharmaceuticals. The drug is approved only in Japan and China.

== Medical uses ==
Nemonapride is used in the treatment of schizophrenia. It is described as being effective in treating the positive symptoms of schizophrenia. It is also said to have some antidepressant and anxiolytic effects. However, clinical data on nemonapride are described as being somewhat limited.

=== Available forms ===
Nemonapride is available in the form of 3 and 10 mg oral tablets.

== Side effects ==
Side effects of nemonapride include akathisia, dystonia, hypokinesia, tremor, hypersalivation, and hyperprolactinemia, among others.

== Pharmacology ==
=== Pharmacodynamics ===
Nemonapride has been described both as a typical antipsychotic and as an atypical antipsychotic. It is a potent and selective dopamine D_{2}, D_{3}, and D_{4} receptor antagonist. Its affinities (K_{i}) for these receptors are 0.16 nM for the dopamine D_{2} receptor, 0.26 nM for the dopamine D_{3} receptor, and 0.31 nM for the dopamine D_{4} receptor. Antagonism of the dopamine D_{2} receptor is thought to be responsible for the antipsychotic effects of nemonapride.

In addition to the dopamine D_{2}-like receptors, nemonapride has weaker affinity for the serotonin 5-HT_{1A} and 5-HT_{2A} receptors. Its affinities (K_{i}) for these receptors are 1.8 nM for the serotonin 5-HT_{1A} receptor (11-fold lower than for the D_{2} receptor) and 9.4 nM for the serotonin 5-HT_{2A} receptor (59-fold lower than for the D_{2} receptor). It is a partial agonist of the serotonin 5-HT_{1A} receptor. It has very weak affinity for sigma receptors (K_{i} = 80–3,000 nM) as well. Besides these specific receptors, nemonapride is described as having very weak affinity for the dopamine D_{1}, serotonin 5-HT_{2}, adrenergic, and cholinergic receptors.

In animals, nemonapride suppresses conditioned avoidance responses, inhibits methamphetamine- and apomorphine-induced hyperactivity and stereotypy, produces catalepsy, and has slight central depressant effects.

=== Pharmacokinetics ===
Nemonapride is metabolized primarily by the cytochrome P450 enzyme CYP3A4. Its elimination half-life is 2.3 to 4.5 hours.

== Chemistry ==
Nemonapride is a benzamide derivative and is structurally related to other dopamine antagonists of the benzamide group such as sulpiride.

=== Structure and stereochemistry ===
Nemonapride is a cis-2-methyl-3-amino-pyrrolidine derivative, which was later shown to express most of its action as a drug to treat schizophrenia from its homochiral (+)-(2R,3R) form.

== History ==
Nemonapride was developed by scientists at Yamanouchi Pharmaceuticals via structural modification of the benzamide antiemetic and gastroprokinetic agent metoclopramide. It was first described in the scientific literature by 1980. The name nemonapride was first used by 1989 and this name was designated as its INN in 1991. The drug was launched in May 1991. However, other sources state that it was launched in 1997.

== Society and culture ==
=== Names ===
Nemonapride is the generic name of the drug and its INN and JAN. It was also previously known as emonapride and by its former developmental code name YM 09151-2. In addition, nemonapride is known by its brand name Emilace (JP: エミレース) in Japan and China.

=== Availability ===
Nemonapride is marketed only in Japan and China. It was also under development for use in other countries, such as France, but development in other countries was discontinued. There are no further plans for nemonapride to be developed for use in the United States, the United Kingdom, or Europe.

== See also ==
- ENX-104, a deuterated analog under development at low doses for depression
