= Veralipride =

Antipsychotic medication

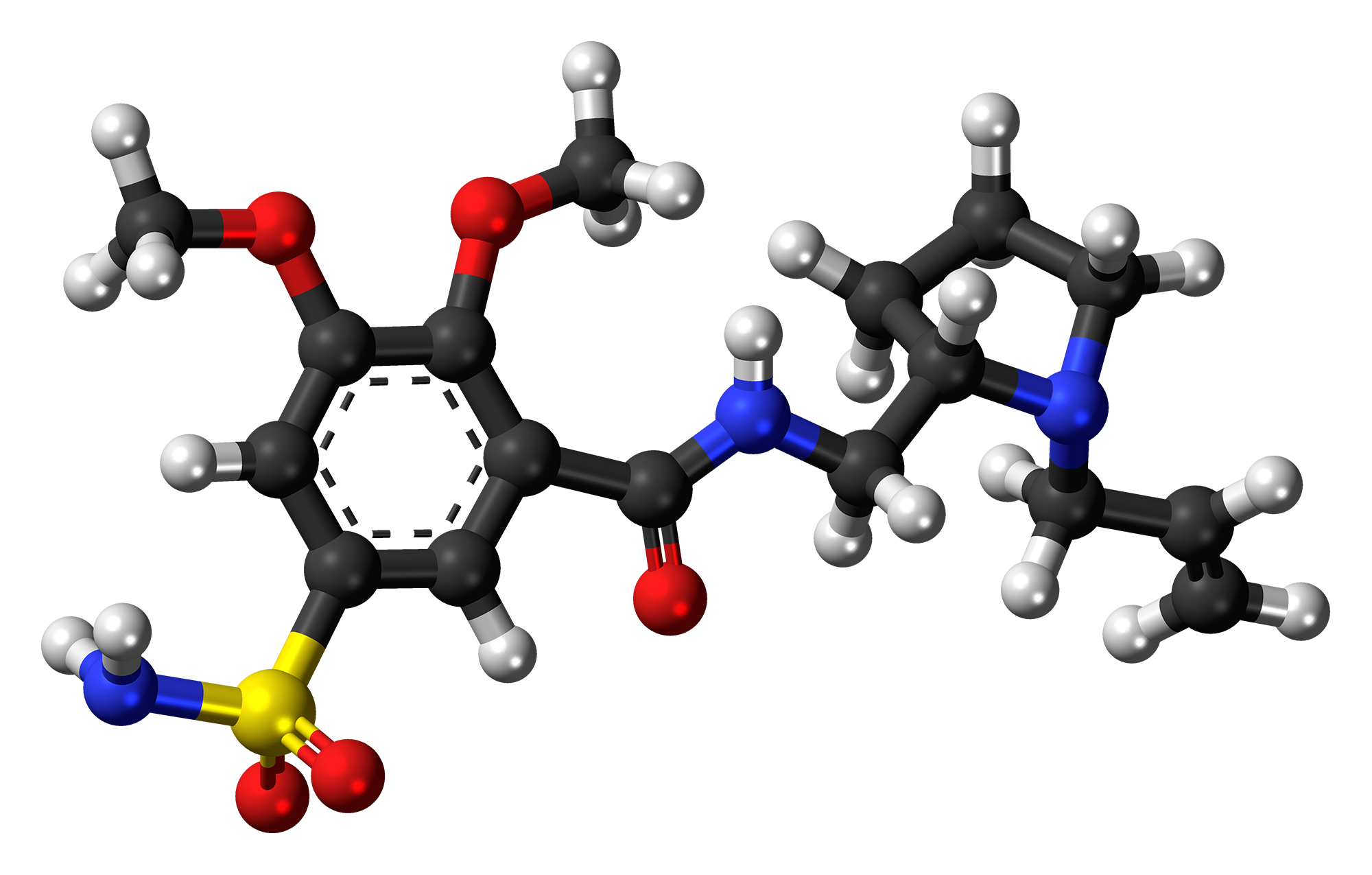

Clinical data
- Trade names: Agreal, Agradil
- Routes of administration: Oral
- ATC code: N05AL06 (WHO)

Legal status
- Legal status: BR: Class C1 (Other controlled substances); In general: ℞ (Prescription only)

Identifiers
- IUPAC name: 2,3-dimethoxy-N-[(1-prop-2-enylpyrrolidin-2-yl)methyl]-5-sulfamoylbenzamide
- CAS Number: 66644-81-3
- PubChem CID: 47979
- ChemSpider: 43638
- UNII: S7064109UD
- KEGG: D07311
- ChEBI: CHEBI:135600
- ChEMBL: ChEMBL2105581
- CompTox Dashboard (EPA): DTXSID6046268
- ECHA InfoCard: 100.060.376

Chemical and physical data
- Formula: C_{17}H_{25}N_{3}O_{5}S
- Molar mass: 383.46 g·mol^{−1}
- 3D model (JSmol): Interactive image
- SMILES: COC1=CC(=CC(=C1OC)C(=O)NCC2CCCN2CC=C)S(=O)(=O)N
- InChI: InChI=1S/C17H25N3O5S/c1-4-7-20-8-5-6-12(20)11-19-17(21)14-9-13(26(18,22)23)10-15(24-2)16(14)25-3/h4,9-10,12H,1,5-8,11H2,2-3H3,(H,19,21)(H2,18,22,23); Key:RYJXBGGBZJGVQF-UHFFFAOYSA-N

Veralipride (Agreal, Agradil) is an atypical antipsychotic of the benzamide class. It is used for the treatment of vasomotor symptoms associated with menopause. It is a D_{2} receptor antagonist and it induces prolactin secretion without any estrogenic or progestagenic effects. It was first authorised for use in 1979. However, Veralipride has never gained approval in the United States.

The women who took it, in addition to extra-pyramidal effects, experienced an aggressive form of depression that resulted in death by suicide for some. The Sanofi laboratory, despite knowing its side effects, allowed women to continue taking it for a considerable amount of time. For this reason, its sale was banned in all countries except Mexico, which allowed its sale to continue for at least 15 years.

In September 2006, veralipride was withdrawn from the Spanish market. As a result, the European Commission referred the matter to the European Medicines Agency (EMA). In July 2007, the EMA recommended the withdrawal of marketing authorisations for veralipride.

== See also ==
- Atypical antipsychotic
- Benzamide
- Levosulpiride
