= Sulpiride =

Typical antipsychotic

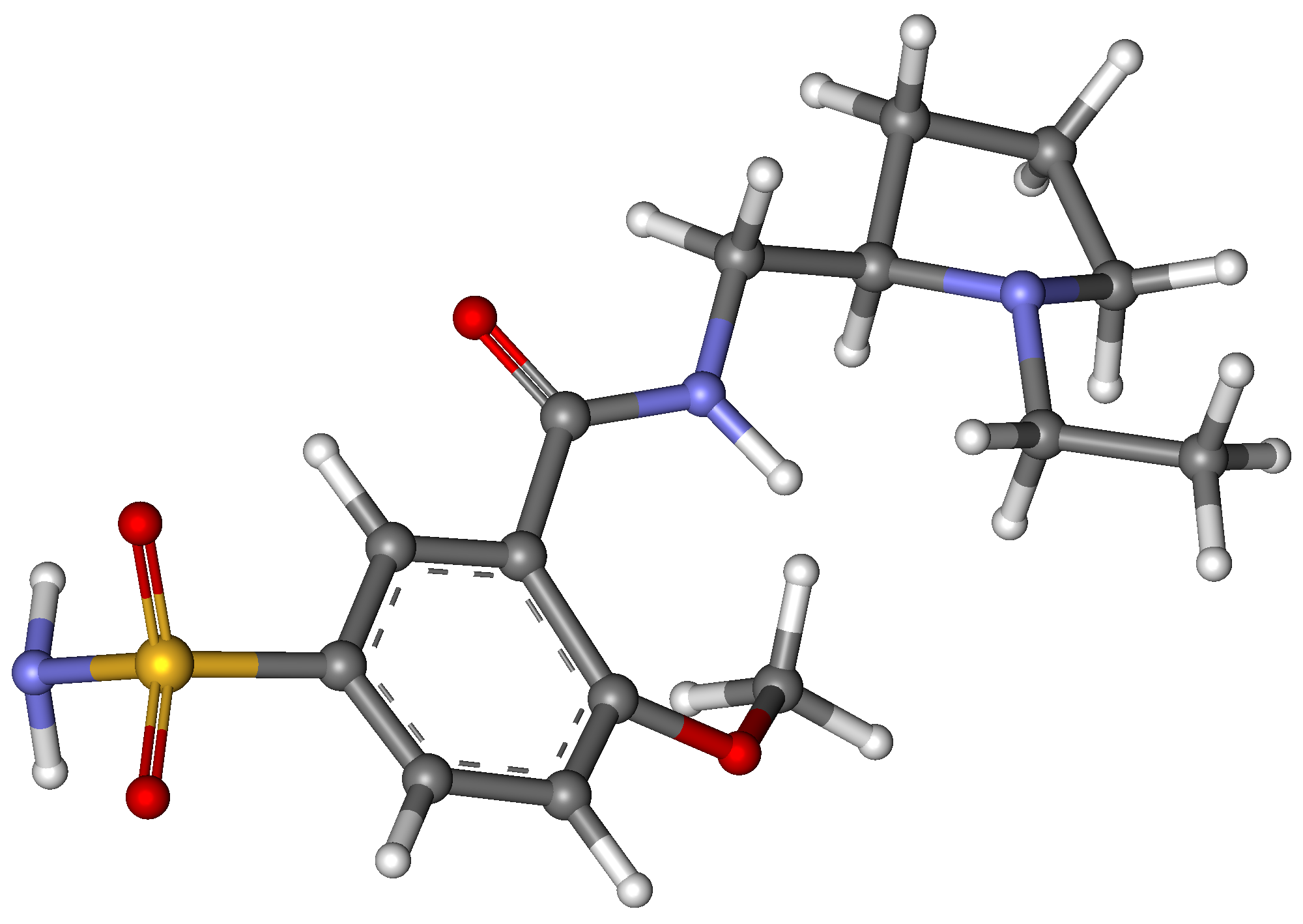

Clinical data
- Trade names: Dogmatil, others
- AHFS/Drugs.com: International Drug Names
- Routes of administration: By mouth, intramuscular
- ATC code: N05AL01 (WHO)

Legal status
- Legal status: BR: Class C1 (Other controlled substances); UK: POM (Prescription only); In general: ℞ (Prescription only)

Pharmacokinetic data
- Bioavailability: 25–40%
- Protein binding: <40%
- Metabolism: Not metabolized; 95% is exerted as the unchanged drug
- Elimination half-life: 6–8 hours
- Excretion: Urine (70–90%), Feces.

Identifiers
- IUPAC name: N-[(1-ethylpyrrolidin-2-yl)methyl]-2-methoxy-5-sulfamoylbenzamide
- CAS Number: 15676-16-1
- PubChem CID: 5355
- IUPHAR/BPS: 5501
- DrugBank: DB00391
- ChemSpider: 5162
- UNII: 7MNE9M8287
- KEGG: D01226
- ChEMBL: ChEMBL26
- CompTox Dashboard (EPA): DTXSID1042574
- ECHA InfoCard: 100.036.124

Chemical and physical data
- Formula: C_{15}H_{23}N_{3}O_{4}S
- Molar mass: 341.43 g·mol^{−1}
- 3D model (JSmol): Interactive image
- SMILES: NS(=O)(=O)c1ccc(OC)c(c1)C(=O)NCC1CCCN1CC
- InChI: InChI=1S/C15H23N3O4S/c1-3-18-8-4-5-11(18)10-17-15(19)13-9-12(23(16,20)21)6-7-14(13)22-2/h6-7,9,11H,3-5,8,10H2,1-2H3,(H,17,19)(H2,16,20,21); Key:BGRJTUBHPOOWDU-UHFFFAOYSA-N

Sulpiride, sold under the brand name Dogmatil among others, is a typical antipsychotic (though it was thought to be an atypical antipsychotic in the past) medication of the benzamide class which is used mainly in the treatment of psychosis associated with schizophrenia and major depressive disorder, and is sometimes used in low dosage to treat anxiety and dysthymia.

The drug is chemically and clinically similar to amisulpride. Levosulpiride is its purified levo-isomer and is sold in some countries for similar purposes.

Sulpiride is commonly used in Asia, Central America, Europe, South Africa and South America. It is not approved in the United States, Canada, or Australia.

== Medical uses ==
=== Schizophrenia ===
Sulpiride's primary use in medicine is in the management of the symptoms of schizophrenia. It has been used as both a monotherapy and adjunctive therapy (in case of treatment-resistance) in schizophrenia.

=== Depression and anxiety ===
It has also been used in the treatment of dysthymia. There is evidence, although low quality, that sulpiride could accelerate antidepressant response in patients with major depressive disorder. In Japan, sulpiride is both approved as a treatment for schizophrenia and for major depressive disorder (low dose).

There is also evidence of its efficacy in treating panic disorder. It was studied at low doses in the treatment of refractory panic disorder and was reported to be effective in a small open-label study.

=== Other uses ===
Sulpiride is indicated for the treatment of vertigo in some countries.

== Contraindications ==
Contraindications

- Hypersensitivity to sulpiride
- Pre-existing breast cancer or other prolactin-dependent tumors
- Phaeochromocytoma
- Intoxication with other centrally-active drugs
- Concomitant use of levodopa
- Acute porphyria
- Comatose state or CNS depression
- Bone-marrow suppression

Cautions

- Pre-existing Parkinson's disease
- Patients under 18 years of age (insufficient clinical data)
- Pre-existing severe heart disease/bradycardia, or hypokalemia (predisposing to long QT syndrome and severe arrhythmias)
- Patients with pre-existing epilepsy. Anticonvulsant therapy should be maintained
- Lithium use — increased risk of neurological side effects of both drugs

=== Pregnancy and lactation ===
- Pregnancy: Animal studies did not reveal any embryotoxicity or fetotoxicity, nor did limited human experience. Due to insufficient human data, pregnant women should be treated with sulpiride only if strictly indicated. Additionally, the newborns of treated women should be monitored, because isolated cases of extrapyramidal side effects have been reported.
- Lactation: Sulpiride is found in the milk of lactating women. Since the consequences are unclear, women should not breastfeed during treatment.

== Side effects ==
Sulpiride is usually well tolerated, producing few adverse effects. Their incidences are as follows:

Common (>1%) adverse effects

- Dizziness
- Headache
- Extrapyramidal side effects

- Tremor
- Dystonia
- Akathisia — a sense of inner restlessness that presents itself with the inability to stay still
- Parkinsonism

- Somnolence (not a very prominent adverse effect considering its lack of α_{1} adrenergic, histamine and muscarinic acetylcholine receptor affinity)
- Insomnia
- Weight gain or loss
- Hyperprolactinemia (elevated plasma levels of the hormone, prolactin which can, in turn lead to sexual dysfunction, galactorrhea, amenorrhea, gynecomastia, etc.)
- Nausea
- Vomiting
- Nasal congestion
- Anticholinergic adverse effects such as:

- Dry mouth
- Constipation
- Blurred vision

- Impaired concentration

Rare (<1% incidence) adverse effects

- Tardive dyskinesia — a rare, potentially irreversible movement disorder that results from prolonged treatment with antidopaminergic agents such as antipsychotics. It presents with slow (hence tardive), involuntary, repetitive and purposeless movements that most often affect the facial muscles.
- Neuroleptic malignant syndrome — a rare, life-threatening complication that results from the use of antidopaminergic agents. Its incidence increases with concomitant use of lithium (medication) salts
- Blood dyscrasias — rare, sometimes life-threatening complications of the use of a number of different antipsychotics (most notably clozapine) which involves abnormalities in the composition of a person's blood (e.g. having too few white blood cells per unit volume of blood). Examples include:

- Agranulocytosis — a significant drop in white blood cell count, leaving individuals wide open to life-threatening opportunistic infections
- Neutropenia
- Leucopenia
- Leukocytosis

- Seizures
- Torsades de pointes

Unknown incidence adverse effects include

- QTc interval prolongation which can lead to potentially fatal arrhythmias.
- Cholestatic jaundice
- Elevated liver enzymes
- Primary biliary cirrhosis
- Allergic reactions
- Photosensitivity — sensitivity to light
- Skin rashes
- Depression
- Catatonia
- Palpitations
- Agitation
- Diaphoresis — sweating without a precipitating factor (e.g. increased ambient temperature)
- Hypotension — low blood pressure
- Hypertension — high blood pressure
- Venous thromboembolism (probably rare)

== Overdose ==
Sulpiride has a relatively low order of acute toxicity. Substantial amounts may cause severe but reversible dystonic crises with torticollis, protrusion of the tongue, and/or trismus. In some cases all the classical symptoms typical of severe Parkinson's disease may be noted; in others, over-sedation/coma may occur. The treatment is largely symptomatic. Some or all extrapyramidal reactions may respond to the application of anticholinergic drugs such as biperiden or benzatropine. All patients should be closely monitored for signs of long QT syndrome and severe arrhythmias.

== Interactions ==
Sulpiride neither inhibits nor stimulates cytochrome P450 family (CYP) of oxidizing enzymes in human, thus would not cause clinically significant interactions with other drugs, which are metabolized by CYPs. However, the risk or severity of adverse effects can be increased when sulpiride is combined with other drugs, but this is not related to substrates, inducers and inhibitors of CYPs.

== Pharmacology ==
=== Pharmacodynamics ===
Sulpiride
Receptor	Affinity (K_{i}, nM)
DAT	>10,000
5-HT_{1A}	>10,000
5-HT_{2A}	4,786
5-HT_{3}	>10,000
5-HT_{6}	5,011
5-HT_{7}	5,011
α_{1}	>10,000
α_{2}	>10,000
D_{1}	>10,000
D_{2}	9.8
D_{3}	8.05
D_{4}	54
H_{1}	>10,000
V_{3}	>10,000
Affinity values are toward cloned human receptors.

Sulpiride is a selective antagonist at dopamine D_{2}, D_{3} and to a lesser extent D_{4} receptors. Antagonism at 5-HT_{2A} dominates in doses exceeding 600 mg daily. In doses of 600 to 1,600 mg sulpiride shows mild sedating and antipsychotic activity. Sulpiride, having a much stronger affinity of dopamine receptors over any of the 5-HT receptors, makes Sulpiride a typical antipsychotic, that is, an antipsychotic that mainly acts on dopamine receptors, as the main feature that defines atypical antipsychotics is combined HT2/D2 activity, which Sulpiride lacks by acting as a highly selective dopamine D_{2}, D_{3} and D_{4} antagonist.

Its antipsychotic potency compared to chlorpromazine is only 0.2 (1/5). In low doses (in particular 50 to 200 mg daily) its prominent feature is antagonism of presynaptic inhibitory dopamine and serotonin receptors, accounting for some antidepressant activity and a stimulating effect. Additionally, it alleviates vertigo.

The benzamide neuroleptics (including sulpiride, amisulpride, and sultopride) have been shown to activate the endogenous gamma-hydroxybutyrate receptor in vivo at therapeutic concentrations. Sulpiride was found in one study in rats to upregulate GHB receptors. GHB has neuroleptic properties and it is believed binding to this receptor may contribute to the effects of these neuroleptics.

Sulpiride, along with clozapine, and valproate has been found to activate DNA demethylation in the brain.

== History ==
Sulpiride was discovered in 1966 as a result of a research program by Justin-Besançon and C. Laville at Laboratoires Delagrange who were working to improve the anti-dysrhythmic properties of procainamide; the program led first to metoclopramide and later to sulpiride. Laboratoires Delagrange was acquired by Synthelabo in 1991 which eventually became part of Sanofi.

== Society and culture ==
=== Brand names ===
Sulpiride is marketed under the brand names Dogmatil (DE, HK, SG, PH, ID, PT), Dolmatil (IE, UK, NL), Eglonyl (RU, ZA, HR, SI), Espiride (ZA), Modal (IL), Prometar (UY), Equilid (BR) and Sulpor (UK), among many others.

=== Medicinal forms ===
These include tablet and oral solution

=== Patient aversions ===
Some individuals from the Caribbean region may have an aversion to taking the medication due to the association with the brand name of Dogmatil. Dogmatil has been associated with dog medication.

== Research ==
=== Hormonal contraception ===
Sulpiride has been studied for use as a hormonal contraceptive in women in whom conventional oral contraceptives are contraindicated and to potentiate progestogen-only contraceptives. The contraceptive effects of sulpiride are due to its prolactin-releasing and antigonadotropic effects and the hyperprolactinemia–amenorrhea state that it induces.

=== Irritable bowel syndrome ===
Since the use of psychotropic drugs is efficient in treating irritable bowel syndrome (IBS), sulpiride is studied as potential sole maintenance therapy in the treatment of IBS.
